= Redkollegia =

Media award

- Редколлегия
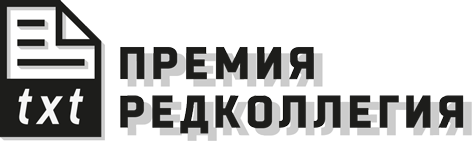
- Awarded for: Journalistic works that meet the high standards of the profession
- Sponsored by: Zimin Foundation
- Country: Russia
- Reward: $2,000–10,000
- First award: 2016
- Website: redkollegia.org

Redkollegia (Russian: Редколлегия, lit. 'Editorial Board') is an independent media award established by the Sreda Foundation headed by Boris Zimin to support free professional journalism in Russia. In 2015, after the Sreda Foundation was closed, charitable activities of Boris Zimin are carried out through the Zimin Foundation.

The prize is awarded monthly to several authors.

The organizers of the award believe that in this way they will be able to “help those who maintain high professional standards in Russia at a time when free and high-quality journalism is under pressure from the state, and the human rights to freedom of expression and free access to information are systematically violated."

The war in Ukraine created new challenges for the award that continues to support the independent journalists who still manage to perform their work in Russia. In particular, the jury has to take into account possible exposing the winners to risk, so before announcing the award publicly, the jury consults with the winners to determine whether they want their names disclose.

== Rules ==
Redkollegia operates with the Founder's aim of providing monthly monetary incentives to Russian journalists who have exhibited exceptional expertise, civic duty, and individual bravery while fulfilling their professional obligations. Redkollegia takes on the responsibility of proposing nominees for the prizes. The Monthly Prize can be suggested to be granted to a single candidate in full or distributed among multiple candidates.

Redkollegia is awarded to a specific author or group of authors for a specific journalistic text (investigation, reportage or interview) published in any available way: in the media, on a personal website, on a social network. The main selection criterion is a high professional level of the text. The audience and the number of readings do not matter. The minimum prize is two thousand dollars.

== Jury ==
The jury of Redkollegia:

- Taisiya Bekbulatova
- Evgenia Volunkova
- Andrey Zakharov (journalist)
- Yelizaveta Osetinskaya
- Anastasia Lotareva
- Tatyana Malkina
- Maxim Solyus — editor at the Organized Crime and Corruption Reporting Project, former editor in Kommersant, Vedomosti, RBK
- Anastasia Sechina
- Sergey Smirnov (journalist)

== Experts and specialists ==
- Maria Eismont, a journalist, reporter, columnist for Vedomosti and media expert;
- Maria Zonina (Мария Зонина), a translator and editor;
- Mikhail Kaluzhsky, a playwright and journalist;
- Leonid Moyzhes, a journalist, editor of the website redkollegia.org;
- Kirill Denisov, a journalist, blogger, editor of accounts in social networks of the Redkollegia award.

== Award winners ==
Month	Authors	Media	Work	Reference
2016
September	Daniil Turovsky	Meduza	The end of privacy	
September	Sergei Medvedev	Forbes	The biopolitics of violence: what the women's flash mob told us about Russia	
September	Ilya Rozhdestvensky; Mikhail Rubin	RBK	The force awakens: who is behind the high-profile special operations of the FSB	
October	Denis Korotkov	Fontanka.ru	A car from Horlivka ran into the polls	
October	Alexander Zhuravlev; Irina Kazankina; Konstantin Andreychuk; Mikhail Sinyukhin	newsvo.ru	Unlucky routes. Who is to blame for the collapse of the Vologda public transport system?	
October	Sergey Shpilkin		Updated distribution of votes by turnout and corrected results	
November	Ksenia Leonova	The Firm's Secret	Russia goes underground: Five days in the garages of Tolyatti	
November	Igor Podgorny		We survived the Patriotic War, we will survive this one too ...	
November	Anton Kravtsov	Help Needed	Out of myself	
December	Alexandrina Elagina	Moloko plus	Continuous terrorism	
December	Ilnur Sharafiev	Meduza	18 thousand rubles per person	
December	Denis Puzyrev	RBK	Time is money: how the underground business of selling expensive watches worked	
December	Maria Bashmakova	Ogoniok	Dissidents	
2017				
January	Tatiana Yurasova	Novaya Gazeta	Mytishchi Gate	
January	Siranush Sharoyan	Republic.ru	Black cash register. How a trillion dollars were taken out of the country in 25 years	
January	Irina Tumakova	Fontanka.ru	How they wanted light in Bogolyubovo and lost their condoms	
February	Vadim Braidov	Help Needed	Puncture and forget	
February	Ksenia Leonova; Nikolay Kononov; Vladimir Shopotov	The Firm's Secret	FSIN archipelago	
February	Polina Eremenko	Snob (magazine)	Corpse # 21449: the story of a posthumous journey	
March	Ilya Azar	Novaya Gazeta	Strikers of Justice	
March	Elena Solovyova	7x7	Erasing the "Frontier"	
March	Dmitry Durnev	Spectrum	How things are done.	
April	Egor Skovoroda	MediaZona	The sea of hermitages.	
April	Andrey Zakharov; Polina Rusyaeva	RBK	RBK investigation: how a "media factory" grew out of a "troll factory"	
April	Olesya Shmagun	Novaya Gazeta	Lawyer Pavlov, "comrade and partner"	
May	Elena Milashina; Irina Gordienko	Novaya Gazeta	Massacres of Chechen gays	
May	Elena Kostyuchenko	Meduza	“You will kill him or we will kill him. Choose which is better"	
June	Alexei Kovalev	Lapshesnimalochnaya	Who and how is sawing millions on deceiving Muscovites	
June	Shura Burtin	Russian reporter	The Hottabych case	
July	Pavel Kanygin	Novaya Gazeta	"I believed that we were not there, in Ukraine"	
July	Dmitry Borko	Grani.ru	A series of reports from the court in the murder of Nemtsov	
July	Ekaterina Borozdina	Help Needed	The doctor doesn't care about your emotions	
August	Maria Klimova; Yulia Suguyeva	MediaZona	"There were rumors in the village."	
August	Vera Shengelia	Meduza	Well get well	
August	Mikhail Danilovich	Zvezda (Perm)	HIV for show.	
September	Roman Badanin; Nikolay Kovalkov; Maria Zholobova; Daria Zhuk	TV Rain	Peterburg's. Father and son	
September	Peter Manyakhin	My friend, you are a transformer	Pure capitalism	
September	Denis Korotkov	Fontanka.ru	A series of publications about the real losses of Russian private military organizations in Syria	
October	Yury Dud; Alexander Aksyonov	vDud	Sergey Bodrov - the main Russian superhero	
October	Alexander Borzenko; Ivan Golunov; Alexander Gorbachyov; Daniil Turovsky	Meduza	There is no "Christian state". But the FSB may be behind it.	
October	Timofey Butenko	Version (Saratov)	Deputy implications: into whose hands the real estate of the Saratov Regional Consumer Union goes	
November	Polina Rusyaeva; Andrey Zakharov	RBK	RBK investigation: how the "troll factory" worked in the US elections	
November	Daniil Turovsky	Meduza	Second Katyn	
November	Elena Racheva	Novaya Gazeta	Edge	
December	Svetlana Reiter	The Bell	Jailed Russian Hacker Claimed Responsibility For U.S. Election Cyber-Attacks	
December	Anna Yarovaya	7x7	Rewrite Sandarmokh	
December	Nadezhda Petrova	Kommersant	Honesty and vice	
2018				
January	Olga Mutovina	Help Needed	Oktyabrina prays	
January	Svetlana Zobova	Russiangate	"Bortnikovka"	
January	Anna Rodionova	VADEMECUM	For what hematologist Elena Misyurina was sentenced to two years in prison	
January	Katerina Gordeeva	Orthodoxy and peace	The case is absurd and clearly indicative	
February	Igor Pushkarev	Znak.com	“Where were they sent and why? How the pigs were sent to slaughter "	
February	Olesya Shmagun; Roman Anin	Novaya Gazeta	Sons of the Fatherland	
February	Evgeny Berg	Meduza	Children who said strange things	
March	Farida Rustamova	BBC Russian Service	"I don't let go of my hands, if only a little": the BBC journalist became the object of harassment of the deputy Slutsky	
March	Maxim Litavrin; Andrey Kaganskikh	MediaZona	Ruslan D. Revolution	
March	Elena Romanova	Bloknot	At an aircraft plant in the Rostov region, more than twenty people were poisoned by thallium	
March	Roman Shleinov	Novaya Gazeta	Novichok has already killed	
April	Irina Tumakova	Novaya Gazeta	The spine is broken, traces of the boiler in the mouth	
April	Andrey Pavlenko	Help Needed	Human life	
April	Alexandra Taranova	Novaya Gazeta	Empowered to remain silent	
May	Nina Abrosimova	My friend, you are a transformer	Cheap drugs appeared — and the grandmothers could not stand it	
May	Alexandr Chernykh	OVD-Info	I wanted to howl, shout to them — what are you doing with my daughter? Are you human or not?	
May	Irina Kravtsova	Meduza	A girl from Vladikavkaz was raped for four months.	
June	Kirill Rukov	Redefine	Sveta Ugolek — model with burns of 45% of the body	
June	Alexandr Chernykh; Ivan Slobodenyuk; Anna Vasilieva	Kommersant	"The dead are talking at last"	
June	Polina Efimova	Codaru.com	Nemchik was born	
July	Orkhan Jemal; Alexander Rastorguev; Kirill Radchenko		Courage and dedication to the profession	
July	Olga Bobrova; Irina Biryukova	Novaya Gazeta	10 minutes in class educational work	
August	Katerina Gordeeva; Roman Super; Alexander Urzhanov	Amur waves	How Serebrennikov spent $ 218 million	
August	Victoria Mikisha	Help Needed (Takie dela)	Tatiana 911	
August	Ivan Golunov	Meduza	Coffin, cemetery, hundreds of billions of rubles	
September	Mark Naumenko	Meduza	Concentration camp for 10 million Uyghurs	
September	Shura Burtin	Meduza	Monitor-1	
September	Vladimir Sokolov	59.ru	"People from the big house come to us and are surprised. They can't afford that on their paycheck."	
October	Elizaveta Pestova	MediaZona	Secret Witnesses Against Jehovah's Witnesses.	
October	Natalia Rostova	YeltsinMedia	Major Izmailov: “There was mess in Chechnya, and I had to promote it. Of course I didn't. "	
October	Evgeny Stetsko	Takie dela	Lonely fight	
October	Evgenia Volunkova; Anna Ivantsova	Takie dela	Birdmen	
November	Rita Roitman	Eto Kavkaz	Khabib's white papakha	
November	Mikhail Rubin	Proekt	A cart from the Kremlin.	
November	Daniil Turovsky	Meduza	The Moscow clinic offered to do female circumcision for girls under 12 for religious reasons.	
December	Yulia Suguyeva	MediaZona	"And leave the bodies for yourself."	
December	Pavel Kanygin	Novaya Gazeta	Khachaturian.	
December	Gleb Yarovy	7x7	Redneck, "master", sadist	
2019				
January	Tatiana Britskaya	Blogger 51	God will give	
January	Marina Malkova	Znak.com	Explosives in the shopping center, four killed and the silence of the security forces	
February	Sergey Yerzhenkov	TV Rain	"The escape".	
February	Daria Burlakova	Novaya Gazeta	Get rich quick recipes	
February	Ivan Kozlov	zvzda.ru	Vera Pavlovna's nightmare: what happens inside a dilapidated house from the project of Hannes Meyer	
February	Sasha Sulim	Meduza	Nobody looked for him, but he continued to kill	
March	Katya Arenina	Proekt	Unmerciful sir.	
March	Zosia Rodkevich	ROMB	Survivors.	
March	Alisa Kustikova; Olesya Shmagun; Irina Dolinina; Alesya Marokhovskaya	Meduza	Russian elite wallet	
April	Elena Chesnokova	My friend, you are a transformer	50 Shades of Red	
April	Sergey Vilkov	News.ru	For 15 years, the General Staff's Office of the Ministry of Defence has spent millions of dollars on psychics	
April	Ilya Rozhdestvensky; Mikhail Rubin; Roman Badanin	Proekt	Master and Chef.	
May	Boris Grozovsky	The Insider	"Calls for the fight against slavery threaten the state system."	
May	Timofey Butenko	nversia.ru	Die within your means: with what salaries regional security officials, doctors, teachers and cultural figures go bankrupt (and how many are there)	
May	Karina Zabolotnaya; Nina Popugaeva; Dmitry Stepanovsky	7x7	Shies' ABC	
June	Maria Pogrebnyak; Anastasia Kulagina	MBK media	Moscow Chernobyl: South-East Expressway at a nuclear burial ground	
June	Julia Vishnevetskaya; Konstantin Salomatin	Radio Liberty	Shies.	
June	Andrey Zayakin	Novaya Gazeta	They planted it on us.	
June	Evgeny Antonov	Paperpaper	How do Petersburgers prove that drugs were planted on them?	
July	Anastasia Stogney; Roman Badanin; Irina Malkova	The Bell	"Commercial guys": how the FSB protects Russian banks	
July	Yana Sakhipova; Mikhail Shubin	OVD-Info	The award was presented to the media team of the OVD-Info project	
July	Pavel Merzlikin	Meduza	Enough's enough	
August	Taisia Bekbulatova	Holod.media	Road to Askiz	
August	Roman Romanovsky	Rugrad.eu	Pay for Shit	
August	Alexander Sokolov	Proekt	State Corporation "Justice".	
September	Irina Dolinina; Alesya Marokhovskaya	Novaya Gazeta	"I will kill you"	
September	Anastasia Yakoreva	Vedomosti	Sponsored articles and pseudo-conferences: how universities are trying to improve their rankings	
September	Nikolay Kudin; Maria Karpenko; Irina Korbat; Denis Lebedev	Fontanka.ru	Demand a recount after the results have been settled.	
September	Andrey Loshak	Current Time TV	Holywar. Runet history.	
October	Alexandra Levinskaya; Alexandra Sivtsova	My friend, you are a transformer	Generation of the shopping center	
October	Marina Bocharova; Nikita Shchurenkov; Mikhail Korostikov	Kommersant	According to the "all our own" system	
October	Sergey Markelov	7x7	Blacklist of the President	
November	Liliya Yapparova	Meduza	Above the law	
November	Irina Pankratova	The Bell	Cybermonarchy of Konstantin Malofeev: how the business of an Orthodox billionaire works	
November	Katerina Gordeeva	eshenepozner (YouTube channel)	Nord-Ost. 17 years	
December	Alexey Pivovarov	Redaktsiya	Crash of Tu-154: what caused Doctor Liza and Alexandrov's choir to die?	
2020
January	Katerina Gordeeva	Meduza	Five years old girl lived her whole life in a private hospital and never left it. By parents' decision	
January	Yulia Apuhtina	Proekt	The fourth stage	
January	Mariya Zaprometova	MBK media	Country of excuses. How Chechens got social media and started to stalk each other for inappropriate content	
January	Katya Arenina	The Bell	Country of cash: how government fight with cashing out for 10 years and who is the winner	
February	Viktor Dereza	Yuga.ru	To put an end to the former life. How the Sochi Olympics changed the lives of Old Believers	
February	Yury Dud	vDud	HIV in Russia - epidemic that no one talks about	
February	Daniil Sotnikov; Maria Zholobova; Roman Badanin	Proekt	Road to nowhere: travel guide of Rublevka, Russia's head road	
March	Sonya Groysman	Proekt	Bureau of edits. How black PR came to Russian Wikipedia	
March	Ilya Gorshkov	Daily Storm	In Russia, the cost of snow removal does not depend on the amount of snow	
March	Yulia Dudkina	Holod.media	Let me walk to the border	
April	Dmitry Durnev	spektr.press	"Based on custom".	
April	Yuri Kozyrev; Elena Kostyuchenko	Novaya Gazeta	This is a storm	
April	Andrey Zakharov	BBC News Russian	"Smart City" or "Big Brother"?	
May	Alexey Pivovarov	Redaktsiya	Russian Bergamo: why did Dagestan fail to fight the coronavirus?	
May	Olesya Ostapchuk	Holod.media	There is such a brotherhood	
May	Irina Shikhman		Virus of silence: what healthcare workers are not allowed to talk about?	
June	Elena Trifonova	baikal-journal.ru	“When you stand at the feet of a dying person, his soul hangs to the right of the body, in the upper corner. Go there"	
June	Sofia Savina	Important Stories	According to the "law of scoundrels"	
June	Irina Kravtsova	Meduza	There are no other entertainments here	
July	Alexey Romanov		A large report from the protest Khabarovsk	
July	Maria Zholobova; Roman Badanin; Mikhail Rubin	Proekt	Brothers Ltd.	
July	Olesya Shmagun	Important Stories	How Russian officials privatised the oldest international organisation in Geneva	
August	Yulia Alykova; Sofia Savina; Ekaterina Moroko	Important Stories	Target audience: how officials send their children to study at prestigious universities without competition	
August	Maxim Solopov	Meduza	Wanted changes, bitches?	
August	Mikhail Rubin	Proekt	Enemy number one	
September	Polina Uzhvak; Sofia Savina; Gleb Limansky	Important Stories	"If you leave, I'll be glad"	
September	Anatoly Suleimanov	Baza.io	The man who stole the republic	
September	Elena Pogrebizhskaya		90 percent of the women there don't wear panties	
October	Maxim Litavrin; Anastasia Boyko; David Frenkel; Egor Skovoroda	Mediazona	Minsk beaten	
October	Roman Shleynov	Important Stories	Secret Poison: Navalny's Poisoning and Russia's Only Novichok Murder Case	
October	Venera Galeeva	Fontanka.ru	Second crematorium	
November	Boris Safronov; Anastasia Yakoreva; Roman Badanin	Meduza	This can be considered a hole	
November	Mikhail Maglov; Egor Skovoroda; Alla Konstantinova; Polina Glukhova	Mediazona	Unknown murderers of Nemtsov	
November	Anna Pushkarskaya	Holod.media	More irreplaceable than Putin	
December	Anastasiya Tselykh	The Firm's Secret	"Pediatric oncology is a commercially uninteresting industry."	
December	Olga Shamina; Sergey Kozlovsky; Anna Pushskarskaya; Timur Sazonov	BBC News Russian	Sochi, District of Columbia: why the Sirius Center will become a federal territory	
December	Yuri Kozyrev Elena Kostyuchenko	Novaya Gazeta	Night, day, night	
2021
January	Liliya Yapparova; Denis Dmitriev; Alexey Kovalev; Mikhail Yaglov	Meduza	It's good to be a president	
January	Alexey Navalny; Maria Pevchikh; Georgy Alburov		Putin's palace	
January	Dmitry Durnev	spektr.press Proekt	Self-proclaimed, part 1. Report on concentration camp working in heart of Europe	
January	Maria Borzunova; Vladimir Romensky; Vasily Polonsky; Alexey Korostelev	TV Rain	Special reports on Alexey Navalny protests	
February	Roman Dobrokhotov	The Insider	Countersanctions. How FSB officers tried to poison Vladimir Kara-Murza	
February	Alesya Marokhovskaya; Ivan Golunov	Important Stories; Meduza	"I'm a witness!" Who helps the police to fabricate drug related cases	
February	Daria Sargsyan	Meduza	We have studied why medicines are constantly disappearing from Russian pharmacies.	
March	Elena Milashina	Novaya Gazeta	"I served in the Chechen police and did not want to kill people" (18+)	
March	Anastasia Yakoreva	Meduza	A man without bones	
March	Svetlana Reiter; Alexandr Ershov; Farida Rustamova	Meduza	A particularly promising grade of oil	
April	Katya Arenina	Important Stories	"If necessary, we will kill you"	
April	Anastasia Kuts; Tatyana Kolobakina; German Nechaev; Nikita Kuchinsky	Proekt; DOXA Magazine	Educational qualification.	
April	Denis Sivkov; Makar Tereshin; Sergey Karpov	Takie dela	Our space	
May	Elena Kostyuchenko; Yuri Kozyrev	Novaya Gazeta	Boarding school	
May	Kirill Rukov	Baza.io	Дети ОПГ	
May	Natalia Sokolnikova	baikal-journal.ru	Two thousand three hundred "eyes" of Baikal	
June	Irina Tumakova	Novaya Gazeta	Operation E	
June	Riza Khasan; Arden Arkman	Novaya Gazeta	Agony on the Angara	
June	Maria Karpenko	Holod.media	Road of bones	
July	Ilya Azar; Anna Artemieva	Novaya Gazeta	The daughter of a samurai is a problem person	
July	Irina Kravtsova	Meduza	We are trapped	
July	Olesya Gerasimenko	BBC News Russian	"Greed and laziness".	
July	Julia Dudkina; Liza Miller; Mikhail Zelensky	Holod.media	"I tell patients not to get vaccinated"	
August	Lilia Yapparova	Meduza	You are enemies of the Fatherland, and you need to be hung on poles	
August	Sasha Sulim	Redaktsiya	Tyumen and others: how to recognize a maniac in advance?	
August	Maria Borzunova	TV Rain	A country in exile: how Belarusians are fleeing the Lukashenka regime and what they hope for	
September	Olga Mutovina	baikal-journal.ru	The decision came - to sell the apartment and invest in "Finiko"	
September	Ekaterina Kotrikadze	TV Rain	Bring back that memory.	
September	Andrey Yashchenko	The Люди	The worst flood in the Far East	
October	Maxim Gongalsky	Novaya Gazeta	Мандаты пользуются вбросом	
October	Kirill Rukov	Baza.io	Jaeger's son.	
October	Elena Yurishina; Lora Fish	Mediazona	Holes are being patched.	
November	Olesya Gerasimenko	BBC News Russian	"We have a ban on reality".	
November	Alesya Marokhovskaya; Ekaterina Bonch-Osmolovskaya	Important Stories; Novaya Gazeta	How propagandists whip up hatred for migrants, and the Ministry of Internal Affairs accuses "foreign agents" of this	
November	Konstantin Goldenzweig	TV Rain	Alexey's Witnesses	
December	Irina Shcherbakova; Anastasia Yasenitskaya	Holod.media	'Why are you crying, Ninochka?' Nina Gnevkovskaya was Beria's girlfriend, and then she was imprisoned. The worst thing happened when she was released	
December	Agentstvo		Executioners lead the investigation. Who and how makes spies out of Russians	
December	Yury Dud; Daniil Turovsky	vDud	Why They Torture People in Russia?	
2022
January	Vladislav Gorin	Meduza	"What Happened?" podcast on how the security services in Russia continue to maintain and increase their influence	
January	Roman Badanin; Mikhail Rubin; Mikhail Maglov; Dmitry Sukharev	Agentstvo	Iron Masks. New Season	
January	Elena Milashina	Novaya Gazeta	Enemy number one. For the first time, Ramzan Kadyrov has faced a threat he cannot control. Research by Elena Milashina	
March	Katerina Gordeeva		Interview with Dmitry Muratov: "Good and evil are well defined"	
March	Lilia Yapparova	Meduza	'They're already on their way.' After three weeks of war, Kyiv and its residents have changed irrevocably. A dispatch from Meduza's Liliya Yapparova	
March	Elena Kostyuchenko	Novaya Gazeta	Kherson	
April	Vasily Matenov; Lilia Matenov	asianofrussia	For covering the topic of Russian servicemen called up in the national republics of the Urals and Siberia, and who died on the territory of Ukraine, in the "Asians of Russia" Instagram page	
April	Anastasia Chumakova; Lilia Yapparova; Alexey Kovalev; Damir Nigmatullin	Meduza	‘I can do whatever I want to you.’ Russian soldiers raped and murdered Ukrainian civilians in the village of Bohdanivka	
April	Shura Burtin	Meduza	Feeling around for something human. Why do Russians support the war against Ukraine? Shura Burtin investigates	
April	Elena Trifonova	baikal-journal.ru	'It all smelled of the dead.' How military personnel who died in Ukraine are buried in Buryatia	
May	Dmitry Treschanin	Mediazona	Mapping the looting. 58 tonnes worth of packages shipped to Russian cities from the border with Ukraine (plus a military drone)	
May	Svetlana Reiter	Meduza	'Toxic assets.' How Russia's invasion of Ukraine tore Yandex apart	
May	Dmitry Durnev	spektr.press	That grandma with a red flag. The interview on how she lived, what she prays for and why she doesn't suspect what the flag of Russia looks like	
June	Ilya Venyavkin	Holod.media	The man who came up with the idea of de-Ukrainizing Ukraine.The story of Timofey Sergeytsev - methodologist, political strategist and war ideologist	
June	Andrey Loshak	Current Time TV	Communication break	
June	MIkhail Maglov; Roman Badanin; Maria Pevchikh; Dmitry Sukharev; Ivan Vasiliev	Proekt	Go-getters. Investigation on how the Chekists privatized the national wealth	
July	Elizaveta Tsybulina; Ilya Shumanov	Transparency International	Bottle Laundromat: How fake trades and British shell companies helped move $820 million of hot money out of Russia	
July	Irina Pankratova	The Bell	War and Peace on TikTok. How Russian TikTok houses turned into military propaganda offices	
July	Andrey Zakharov; Maria Korenyuk	BBC Russian Service	'We've lost everything we've earned through hard work.' Russia exports from Ukraine not only grain, but also sunflower	
August	Ekaterina Fomina	Important Stories	"'Dispose of Them,' the Commander Ordered." Important Stories learned the names of Russian soldiers involved in the killings of local residents in the Kyiv region. We called them, one soldier confessed to everything	
August	Svetlana Anokhina	cherta.media	How Patimat became Victoria. The story of a girl from Dagestan who fled from her family to freedom	
August	Katya Arenina	Proekt	The Process. How the security officers came up with the case of Ivan Safronov	
September	Peter Ruzavin	Mediazona	'They liberated us from our entire civilization.' How towns in the Kharkiv region of Ukraine lived under Russian occupation	
September	Vladimir Sevrinovsky	Meduza	‘They're mostly after loans.’ Tuvans, trying to scramble out of poverty, are dying in a foreign war	
September	Dmitry Durnev	spektr.press	Buried. How bodies in Russian uniforms emerge from the ground near Kharkiv and what happens to dead Russians in Ukraine	
October	Irina Babicheva	161.ru	I will take you back. How the wives and mothers of prisoners prevent them from being sent from the Rostov region to Ukraine	
October	Denis Puzyrev	Sports.ru	Russian sport without foreign goods is a utopia.	
October	Anastasia Krasilnikova	libolibo.me	Pupils	
November	Shura Burtin	Meduza		
November	Anastasia Stogney	BBC News Russian		
November	Elizaveta Focht; Anastasia Lotareva	BBC News Russian		
December	Tatiana Britskaya	novaya.media		
December	Maria Zholobova; Stephen Grey; Maurice Tamman	iStories; Reuters; RUSI	The West Has Banned the Sale of Components for Weapons Production to Russia. But Russia's Main Weapons Manufacturer, Rostec, Is Still Buying Them	
December	Maxim Kurnikov; Alexander Arkhangelsky; Tatyana Sorokina	Current Time TV	Hunger	
2023
January	Sergey Vakulenko	Re-russia.net		
January	Nina Abrosimova	thenewtab.io		
January	Olga Mutovina	baikal-journal.ru		
February	Anna Fimina	TV Rain		
February	Ekaterina Bonch-Osmolovskaya; Alesya Marokhovskaya; Irina Dolinina; Sofia Savina; Polina Uzhvak; iStories	iStories		
February	Kira Derevtsova	chita.ru		
March	Evgenia Khatskevich	vot-tak.tv		
March	Victoria Ivleva	victoriaivleva_		
March	Alexander Amzin; Artem Efimov; Natalia Kondrashova; Vitaly Vasilchenko	getsignal.news		
