= Dmitry Markov (photographer) =

Russian documentary photographer (1982–2024)

- Дмитрий Марков
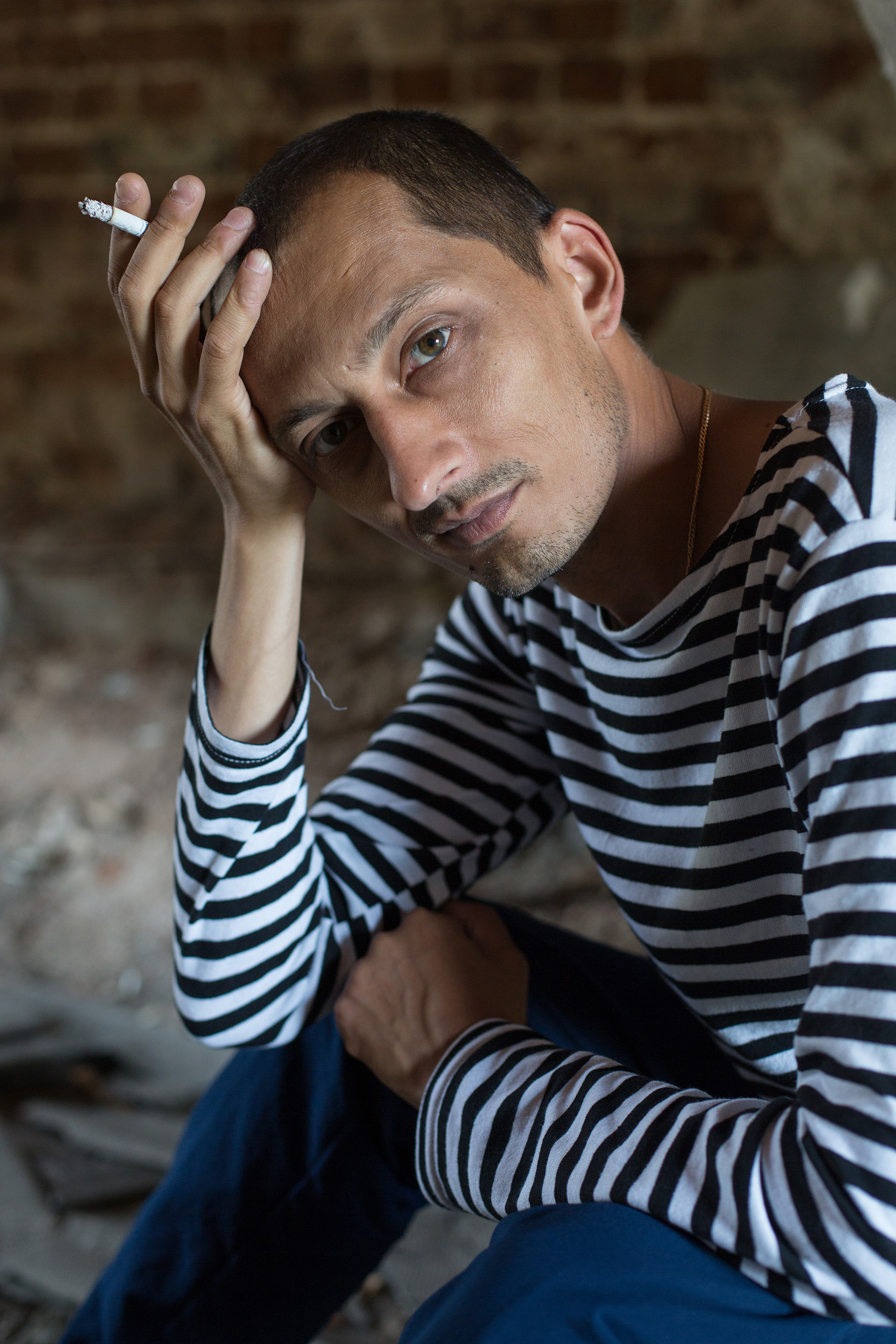
- Born: 23 April 1982; Pushkino, Russian SFSR, Soviet Union
- Died: 15 February 2024 (aged 41); Pskov, Russia
- Occupations: Journalist, photographer
- Employers: Argumenty i Fakty; Takie Dela; Meduza

Dmitry Alexandrovich Markov (Russian: Дмитрий Александрович Марков; 23 April 1982 – 15 February 2024) was a Russian journalist and photographer. Gained fame by creating genre shots of "provincial Russia" on a regular smartphone camera and publishing them on his Instagram account.

== Career ==
Dmitry Markov was born on 23 April 1982, in Pushkino. He moved to Pskov as a child. He went to engineering college. During this period, Markov acquired his first camera. According to himself, he studied photography with Alexander Lapin.

In 2005, Markov was invited to photograph at an orphanage, and as a result of this trip, he became interested in volunteering. This passion led to a move from the Moscow region to Porkhov. At the time, Markov was a drug addict. Since 2007, having overcome his addiction, Dmitry started working in the Pskov public organization "Rostok" with orphans from correctional orphanages and worked there until 2012, as well as a tutor in the children's village "Fedkovo". With employees of charitable foundations, he toured dozens of social institutions, ranging from orphanages to colonies. At the same time, he photographed the life of teenagers and described it on his blog.

Until 2007, he worked as a photographer and journalist for the newspaper Argumenty i Fakty. Markov also worked as a photojournalist for Takie Dela and Meduza.

In 2013, he participated in David Alan Harvey's Burn Diary project, adopting the concept for his Instagram - to shoot only on his cell phone and post only what he photographed today.

In 2015, Markov received a grant from Getty Images and Instagram for his documentary photography. In 2016, he became the first Russian participant and one of 15 photographers from 15 countries who participated in the iPhone 7 advertising campaign "Apple's Taken on the iPhone".

In 2017, Markov's first book, #Chernovik, was published by Treemedia. On the occasion of the book's release in February 2018, Moscow's Fotodoc Center for Documentary Photography hosted Markov's solo exhibition "Russia. #Chernovik."

In 2018, a solo exhibition of Markov's work was held under the patronage of French fashion designer agnès b. as part of the international photography exhibition Paris Photo 2018, held in Paris from November 8–11.

In 2018, he also took part in the exhibition "HOPE" in France, organized by the Manuel Rivera-Ortiz Foundation.

In 2019, Markov's works were again presented by agnès b. at the Paris Photo 2019 exhibition as part of a joint exhibition with Claudine Doury and Ched Mur.

In 2019, a solo exhibition of Markov's "#Draft #Russia" took place at the VisionQuesT art gallery in Genoa. In the same year, the second book by Markov "CUT OFF" was released by the French publisher IIKKI Books. From April 6 to June 4, 2019, Markov's solo exhibition took place at the agnès b. gallery boutique in New York. In October 2019, Markov starred in Kirill Serebrennikov's film Petrov's Flu.

From late 2020 to April 2021, he was co-host of the new project "Anti-Travel" on the YouTube channel Редакция. The project is dedicated to traveling to different places in Russia, "where ordinary people do not go for their money".

April 23, 2021 in the Gogol Center opened a solo exhibition of the photographer "Russia squared". The exhibition was accompanied by the presentation of the latest edition of his photo book "#Chernovik".

Markov's work chronicled everyday life in various regions of Russia. Meduza compared his photographs to unofficial Soviet photographs, which showed life without regard for ideological objectives. The composition of his photographs often resembled a theatrical mise-en-scène. He often focused on the contrast between the official and the private, the artificial and the natural, the planned and the accidental. Markov preferred using a smartphone to take pictures and mainly posted them to Instagram. He published three books of his photography. His work was shown around the world, with exhibitions in Moscow, Paris and New York City.

== Protesting and 2021 arrest ==
Markov began photographing Russian street protests starting in 2012. Nine years later, on 2 February 2021, he was detained near the Moscow City Court, where he came to support then-incarcerated Putin-opponent Alexei Navalny. The photographer was taken to the Kosino-Ukhtomsky police station, where he took a picture of a security officer wearing a bulletproof vest and a balaclava, sitting under a portrait of Russian President Vladimir Putin. This photo went viral on social media and became a source of memes. A few days later, the only signed author's print of the photograph was sold at a charity auction on Facebook for 2 million rubles. Markov promised to divide the amount between OVD-Info and the Apology of Protest, two organizations engaged in helping detainees at political rallies.

== Death ==
Markov died in Pskov of a purported overdose of the opioid methadone. He was 41. The body was found on February 16. The date of death is reported in the media as February 16. The date of February 15 is written on his grave. He is buried at the Novo-Derevenskoye cemetery in Pushkino near Moscow.

== Criticism ==
Critics often accused Markov of "denigrating Russian reality" and showing unsightly pictures of provincial life. However, Markov explained that he focuses on the unpleasant details because he knows and feels the needs of not-so-well-off people very well. Among the heroes of his photos are disabled people, orphans, prisoners, military men and just inhabitants of the Russian countryside. Some europeans call Markov's photographs illustrations of Russian classics.

Some critics have compared the style of Markov's photographs to Renaissance paintings and Alexander Deineka's paintings.

== Awards ==
- Silver Camera Grand Prix
- In 2015, Markov received a Getty Images Instagram Grant through a program to encourage photographers who use Instagram to tell the stories of little-known communities
- Winner of the Anna Politkovskaya Kamerton Prize (2021)

== Legacy and remembrance ==
In 2024, a rehabilitation center for drug-dependent teenagers named after Dmitry Markov was established in Nizhny Novgorod.

Artist Dmitry Vrubel has created a virtual museum, one of whose departments bears Markov's name.

== Bibliography ==
- Markov, Dmitry (2018). ЧЕРНОВИК – Издательство Treemedia (in Russian). Treemedia. p. 204. ISBN 978-952-68506-6-5.
- Markov, Dmitry (2019). Cut off. Plouer-sur-Rance: Iikki. p. 96. ISBN 978-2955795378.
- Markov, Dmitry (1 January 2021). Russia² (in Russian). TREEMEDIA CONT. ISBN 978-952-69467-6-4.

== Filmography ==
- Fragments (2020)
- Petrov's Flu (2021)
- Survivors (2024)
