= Irina Pankratova =

Russian journalist

Irina Pavlovna Pankratova Ирина Павловна Панкратова
- Born: Irina Pavlovna Pankratova; 10 September 1986; Leningrad, Russian SFSR, Soviet Union
- Died: 10 May 2025 (aged 38); Manheim, Germany
- Education: Saint-Petersburg State University
- Occupation: Investigative journalist
- Years active: 2008–2024

Irina Pavlovna Pankratova (Russian: Ирина Павловна Панкратова; 10 September 1986 Leningrad, USSR – 10 May 2025, Manheim, Germany) — Russian Investigative reporter. She worked for leading business and socio-political publications in Russia, including Delovoy Peterburg, RBK Group and The Bell.

== Biography ==
She graduated from the Faculty of Journalism at Saint Petersburg State University in 2008.

She began her career in local St. Petersburg media outlets such as "Petersburg Leaflet", "OK-INFORM", and "The Conservative", where she worked from 2008 to 2014. In 2014, she joined "Delovoy Peterburg", where in 2016 she received the "Golden Pen" award for her article on the street trade market in St. Petersburg.

After a change in leadership at "Delovoy Peterburg", she voluntarily moved to Moscow and joined RBC. Her article about the online casino Azino777 was nominated for the Redkollegia award.

In 2019, she joined the outlet The Bell. While working at The Bell, Pankratova received the Redkollegia Award four times.

In August 2021, unknown individuals attempted to hack Pankratova's phone.

In 2022, she left Russia following the Russian invasion of Ukraine.

In November 2024, she was diagnosed with cancer. On 10 May 2025, after a prolonged battle with the illness, she died in a clinic in Germany.

== Public stance ==
She expressed support for Ivan Golunov at a rally after his arrest on false charges.

== Awards ==
- Laureate of the "Golden Pen" award together with Pavel Gorshkov and Lilia Agarkova for the article "An Entrepreneur on a City Scale: How Spontaneous Street Vendors Avoid Trouble with Police and Officials";
- Four-time laureate of the Redkollegia for articles published as a journalist for The Bell:

- November 2019 – for the article "The Cyber-Monarchy of Konstantin Malofeev: Inside the Business of the Orthodox Billionaire";
- July 2022 – for the article "War and Peace on TikTok: How Russian ‘TikTok Houses’ Became Offices of War Propaganda";
- September 2023 – jointly with Maria Zholobova ("Important Stories"), Svetlana Reiter (Meduza), and Andrey Pertsev (Meduza) for the article "And Then the Idea Came — To Make Fakes", published by "Important Stories";
- October 2024 – jointly with Pyotr Mironenko and Irina Malkova for the article "From the Central Bank to the FSB: The Fall of Probusinessbank That Sparked a Scandal Around FBK"
