= Chrisoula Christou =

Greek actress, director

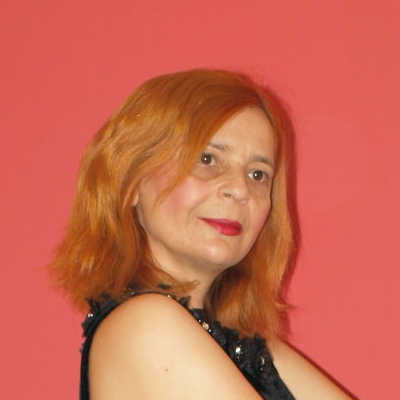
- Born: 1962 (age 63–64); Larissa, Greece

Chrisoula Christou (Greek: Χρυσούλα Χρήστου) is a Greek actress, director and radio producer. She is a public personality in the Greek cultural and political scene.

== Biography ==
Chrisoula Christou was born in Larissa in 1962. She studied photography at AKTO in Athens and then she moved to Thessaloniki where she studied at Drama School of Mary Vogiatzi Traga. She has played in and directed many theater plays in Greece and presented books from modern Greek literature authors in literary salons.

== Work ==
=== Stage ===
- 2020: Κοντραμπάσο from Patrick Suskind (English: Contrabass. Director.)
- 2019: Ο ουρανός κατακόκκινος from loula Anagnostakis (English: Deep red sky. Director and actress.)
- 2018: Τρεις μονόλογοι from Jean Cocteau (English: Three monologues. Director and actress.)
- 2017: Καρέκλες from Eugène Ionesco, directed by Ακυς Μητσούλης (English: The Chairs. Αctress.)
- 2016: Σαμιουλ Μπέκετ Η Τελευταία μαγνητοταινια του Κραπ from Samuel Becket, directed by Ακυς Μητσούλης (English: Krapp's Last tape. Actress.)
- 2015: Αντον Τσεχωφ Η Αρκούδα from Anton Tchekov (English: The Bear . Director and actress.)
- 2014: Κούκλες from Ioanna Fotiadou (English: Dolls. Director and actress.)
- 2010: Πάθη στο κόκκινο from Ilia Sdrallli (English: Passions in red. Producer, director, actress)
- 2010: 19 Γυναίκες σε μία φωνή (English: 19 Women in one voice. Actress, singer)
- 2011, 2013: Μαύρα Τριαντάφυλλα (English: Black Roses. Producer, director, actress)

=== Radio ===
Chrisoula Christou was the producer of the weekly radio show Mousikes Istories (Μουσικές Ιστορίες) on the station Dimotiko Radiofono Larissas.
