= Andrei Borisovich Loshak =

Russian journalist and reporter

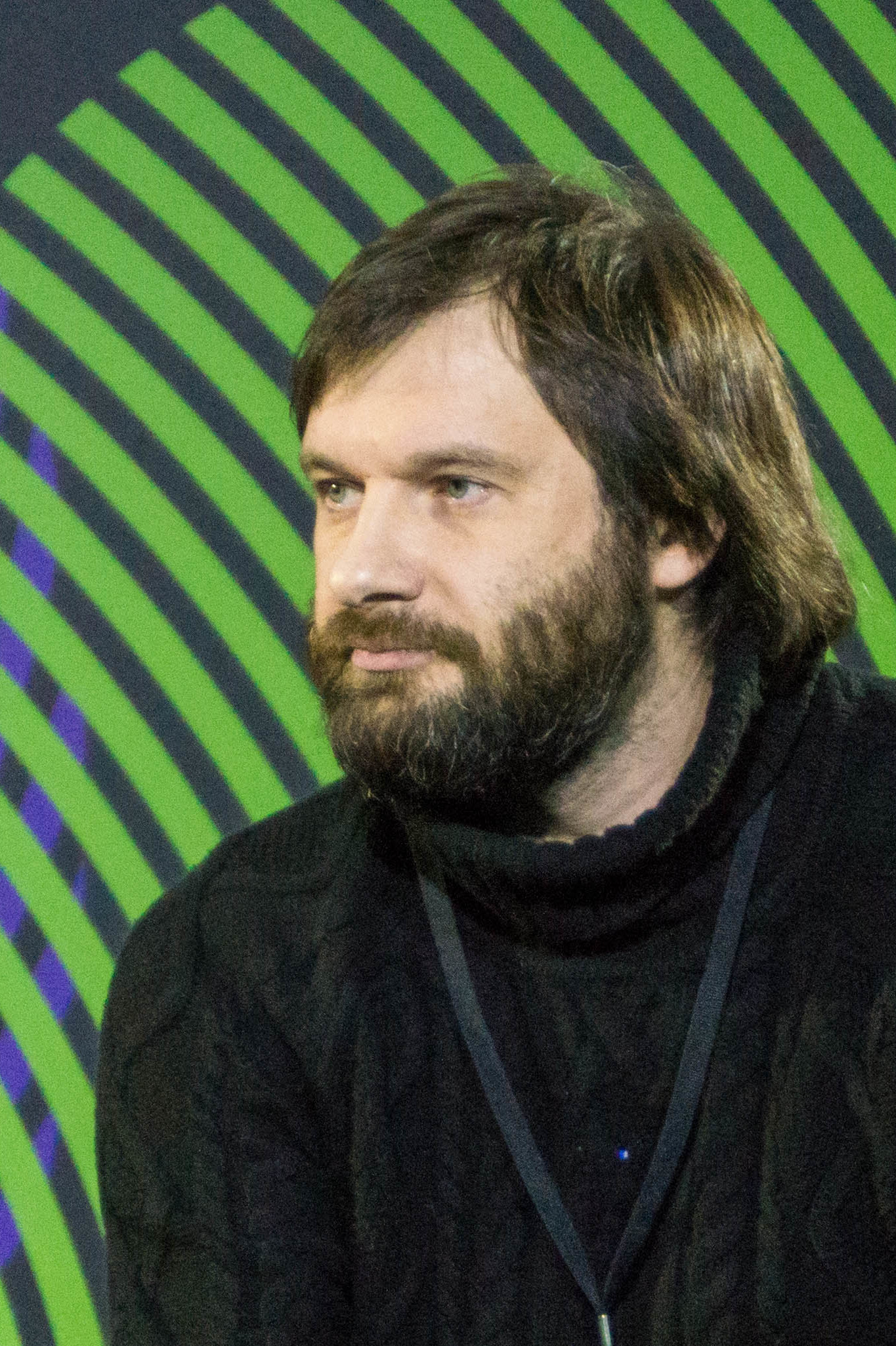
Loshak in 2015

Andrei Borisovich Loshak (Russia: Андрей Борисович Лошак; born November 20, 1972, Moscow, RSFSR) is a Russian journalist and reporter.

== Biography ==
Loshak was born on November 20, 1972, in Moscow into the family of artists Boris Loshak and Olga Uvarova. He graduated from MSU Faculty of Journalism in 1996.

Loshak started working in television in 1995: in his fourth year of university he became an administrator in Leonid Parfyonov's program Namedni. Non-Political News for the Week on the NTV channel. Later he started making small stories for this program, then became a scriptwriter and editor-in-chief of the talk show About It - the first talk show about sex in Russia. Since 2000, Loshak worked as a scriptwriter and producer of the TV series Russian Empire. From 2001 to 2004, he was a correspondent for the programs Segodnya and Strana i Mir, as well as for the updated program Namedni. From the fall of 2004 to 2009, Loshak was a regular contributor to the television show Profession - Reporter.

Loshak left NTV in 2010 and became an editorial director of Esquire magazine (Russia) a year later. In 2012, NTV aired Loshak's five-part investigative series Russia. Total Eclipse made in the pseudo-documentary genre.

From 2013 to 2015, Andrei Loshak worked for TV Rain. In December 2014, he directed a six-part documentary Journey from St. Petersburg to Moscow: A special way for TV Rain.

From May 2015 to April 2016 he was the editor-in-chief of the information portal Help Needed. Until November 2017, he worked there as one of the columnists.

In 2019, Loshak directed the documentary series Holivar. History of Runet. The series was presented in Cannes. In Russia, the series was nominated for the Laurel Branch Award as the best scientific and educational film.

In July 2020, Loshak was interviewed by Yury Dud. Among other subjects, he talked about how he refused to receive a medal from the hands of Vladimir Putin.

In December 2021, Loshak released He is the only one a documentary filmed for the anniversary of Tinkoff Bank.

In February 2022, Loshak's documentary series Russian Hackers: The Beginning was released. The film focused on the birth of hacking in Russia and its impact on the world.

Loshak moved to Georgia in March 2022 after the start of the Russian invasion of Ukraine. Same year in June, he released the documentary film Broken Ties about the rifts in Russian families that occurred after the beginning of the full-scale war in Ukraine.

On February 17, 2023, the Russian Ministry of Justice added Loshak to the list of foreign agents. On October 14, 2023, Loshak released the documentary film Pentagon about the social problems of modern Russian society. The film portrays people living in a former dormitory that belongs to the administration of Novouzensk.

== Family ==
Loshak is the nephew of journalist Viktor Loshak, cousin of journalist and host of the TV Rain channel Anna Mongait.

Loshak was married to Angela Iziaslavovna Boskis between 1995 and 2004. She is his third cousin. Boskis worked with Loshak on creating the talk show About It.

His second wife is Irina Filippova, a screenwriter and producer. From their marriage he has a son, Boris (born in 2016).

== Awards ==
- TEFI Award in the category "Best TV Reporter" (2003).
- Man of the Year Award of the GQ Magazine in the nomination "TV Face" (2005).
- Medal of the Order "For Merit to the Fatherland", First Class, for great contribution to the development of national television and many years of fruitful work (2007). Loshak was absent at the award ceremony.
- Rain Man Award, presented by the Silver Rain Radio for actualizing the protest against Nazism in modern society (2010).
- Laurel Branch Award for the film Journey from St. Petersburg to Moscow: A special way in the category "Best Documentary Series" (2015).
- Russian Government Media Award for the creation of a new format of information portal for the support and development of charity in Russia (2017).
- Grand Prix of the Artdocset Contest for the documentary series Age of Dissent (2018).
- Journalism as a Profession Award of the Open Russia Foundation for the documentary series Holivar. History of Runet (2019).
- Redkollegia Award for Holivar. History of Runet (2019).
- Redkollegia Award for Breaking the Link (2022).
