= Alexei Kovalev (disambiguation) =

Alexei Kovalev (born 1973) is a Russian professional ice hockey coach.

Alexei Kovalev may also refer to:

- Alexey Kovalev (journalist), Russian journalist
- Alexei Kovalev (referee), Russian football referee
- Oleksii Kovalov, Ukrainian politician and victim of terrorist assassination
