= 7×7 =

7x7 may refer to:

- Boeing 7x7 series, Boeing's "7-Series" of airliners
- Boeing 767, wide-body aircraft codenamed "7X7" during development
- 7x7 (magazine), a San Francisco-focused fashion, food, and entertainment magazine
- 7x7 (website), a Russian website
- V-Cube 7, the 7×7×7 version of Rubik's Cube

== See also ==
- 7 & 7
- 7/7
