= Kanygin =

Kanygin (Russian: Каныгин) is a Russian masculine surname, its feminine counterpart is Kanygina. Notable people with the surname include:

- Igor Kanygin (born 1956), Belarusian wrestler
- Pavel Kanygin (born 1987), Russian journalist
- Vladimir Kanygin (1948–1990), Russian weightlifter
