= Ilya Azar =

Russian journalist

- Илья Азар
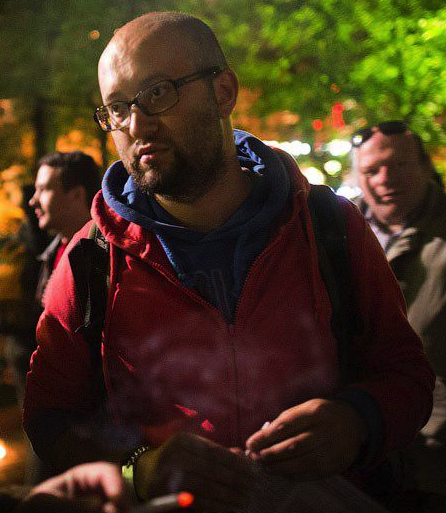
- Azar in 2012
- Born: Ilya Williamovich Azar; 29 June 1984 (age 42); Moscow, Soviet Union
- Education: Higher School of Economics (2006)
- Occupation: Journalist

Ilya Vilyamovich Azar (Russian: Илья Вильямович Азар; born June 29, 1984) is a Russian journalist, special correspondent for Novaya Gazeta since 2017, former special correspondent for the online publication Lenta.ru, and a former special correspondent for the Meduza project. He was a Member of the Council of Deputies of the Khamovniki District in Moscow.

Azar was charged with organising opposition demonstrations demanding free elections to Moscow's city legislature on September 8, 2019. In May 2020, he was arrested and jailed for 15 days for breaking protest laws during a protest against the detention of a campaigner against police corruption. Other journalists were subsequently arrested while protesting against Azar's arrest.

He was also criticized by authorities of Kazakhstan for a text at Meduza describing local separatists. This led to blocking of Meduza in Kazakhstan.

Azar is a two-time winner of the Redkollegia media award.
