= Olesya Shmagun =

Russian investigative journalist

- Олеся Валентиновна Шмагун
- Born: 21 August 1987
- Education: MSU Faculty of Journalism, Princeton School of Public and International Affairs
- Occupations: Investigative journalist, reporter, correspondent, activist, journalist
- Employer: Novaya Gazeta Europe (2024–)
- Awards: Redkollegia (Lawyer Pavlov, "comrade and partner", 2017); Pulitzer Prize for Explanatory Reporting (Panama Papers, 2017); Redkollegia (Sons of the Fatherland, 2018); Redkollegia (Purse of the Russian elite, 2019); Redkollegia (How Russian officials privatized the oldest international organization in Geneva, 2020); European Press Prize Investigative Reporting Award (Kirill and Katya: Love, offshores, and administrative resources. How marrying Putin’s daughter gave Kirill Shamalov a world of opportunity, 2021)

Olesya Valentinovna Shmagun (Russian: Олеся Валентиновна Шмагун, IPA: [ʂmɐˈɡʊn]; born 21 August 1987) is a Russian investigative journalist. She worked for the Russian newspaper Novaya Gazeta and the Organized Crime and Corruption Reporting Project (OCCRP). Shmagun is one of the founders of the iStories media outlet.

== Education ==
Olesya Shmagun was born on 21 August 1987. In 2012, she graduated from the MSU Faculty of Journalism. From 2012 to 2015, Shmagun studied full-time postgraduate studies at Moscow State University and on 23 June 2017 she received her Candidate of Philological Sciences degree. The topic of her doctoral thesis was "Small" newspaper Petrogradskiy Listok in the period between the two revolutions of 1917. In 2023, she graduated from the Princeton School of Public and International Affairs with a Master in Public Policy degree.

== Career ==
Shmagun has worked as a journalist for various organisations, including AvtoRadio, Gazeta, Vzglyad and Izvestia. She also worked for two year for The Village outlet. In 2013 and 2014, she worked as a curator at the Moscow City Library Centre, which was engaged in the development of libraries in Moscow. Since the summer of 2015, she has been working at the Organized Crime and Corruption Reporting Project.

On 30 April 2020, it became known that Russian journalist Roman Anin and Olesya Shmagun are launching the Important Stories investigative journalism outlet. In January 2021, Shmagun left the outlet.

On 20 August 2021, Shmagun was included in the list of persons performing the functions of "foreign agents" in Russia.

== Awards ==
In 2016, Olesya Shmagun received the Investigative Reporters and Editors Prize for Khadija Project, investigating the corruption of Azerbaijan's ruling family.

She was awarded the Redkollegia journalism award four times, in 2017, 2018, 2019 and 2020.

In 2017, Shmagun received the Pulitzer Prize for Explanatory Reporting as a member of the International Consortium of Investigative Journalists group. She and her colleagues worked on the Panama Papers archive. Their investigation was published in Novaya Gazeta.

A 2018 honourable mention of the Trace Prize for investigative reporting for the "Agents of Influence" investigation.

In 2020, she received Sigma Award in the Best data-driven reporting category.

In 2021, Shmagun received the European Press Prize Investigative Reporting Award for an article "Kirill and Katya: Love, offshores, and administrative resources. How marrying Putin's daughter gave Kirill Shamalov a world of opportunity". The article described the results of an investigation into the ex-husband of the daughter of Russian president Vladimir Putin.
