= Coda Media =

News organization based in New York

- Website type: Online magazine
- Available in: English
- Headquarters: New York City, United States
- CEO: Natalia Antelava
- Industry: Journalism
- Website: www.codastory.com
- Launched: January 18, 2016; 10 years ago
- Current status: Active

Coda Media is a nonprofit news organization that produces journalism about the roots of major global crises. It was founded in 2016 by Natalia Antelava, a former BBC correspondent, and Ilan Greenberg, a magazine and newspaper writer who was a staff reporter for The Wall Street Journal.

== Executives ==
As of 2024, the organization is led by Antelava, who is CEO and editor-in-chief, and overseen by a board of directors. Notable board members include Nicholas Dawes, the executive director of The City and former communications director for Human Rights Watch; and Maria Ressa, the Nobel Peace Prize-winning co-founder and CEO of Rappler. Peter Pomerantsev, a British journalist and TV producer, and Oliver Bullough, a British writer, are contributing editors.

Coda has been focused on reporting on Russian disinformation campaigns. Coda has created a documentary about the history of Soviet Gulag camps.

== Concept ==
Coda produces written stories, video reports, podcasts and newsletters focused on one major theme at a time in order to put "individual stories in the context of larger events." According to Antelava, Coda aims to cover "crises in a way that creates a meaningful, cohesive narrative". Coda covers many global issues, including disinformation, authoritarian technology, the war on science, and rewriting history. The site's first theme covered LGBT issues in Eastern Europe and Eurasia.

Coda is an example of "pioneer journalism".

== Funding ==
Coda Media is a 501(c)(3) organization with offices in New York City and Tbilisi, Republic of Georgia. It is supported by foundation grants and private donations and has also experimented with crowd-funding. Coda Media has partnered with several newsrooms throughout Eurasia via the Coda Network, which received a grant of $180,130 from the National Endowment for Democracy.

== Awards ==
The organization and its contributors have won several awards throughout the last decade:

- In 2023, Anna-Catherine Brigida's report for Coda about the surveillance state in Honduras won first prize in the 2023 Fetisov Journalism Awards in the category of Contribution to Civil Rights.
- In 2022, Peter Pomerantsev was given the European Press Prize's Public Discourse Award for his piece exploring why certain news events fail to capture sustained public attention.
- In 2022, Coda was the winner of the Online News Association's award for explanatory reporting conducted by a small newsroom for the report "Germany’s historical reckoning is a warning for the US" by Erica Hellerstein. The judges described the report as a "masterful storytelling" and "a thorough, devastating piece and poignant analysis of who must carry these stories and who has the privilege/shame/guilt to avoid or bury them."
- In 2020, Isobel Cockerell won the European Press Prize's Distinguished Reporting Award for her report on Uyghur women fighting against China's surveillance state.
- In 2018, Coda Story and Reveal won the Alfred I. duPont-Columbia University Award for their collaborative radio documentary "Russia's New Scapegoats", which explores the human costs as well as the political reasons behind the Kremlin's war on gay people.
- In 2014, Coda won the Best Startups for News competition from the Global Editors Network.

Coda's journalism and reporters have been a runner-up or a finalist in several other awards cycles:

- Isobel Cockerell was a finalist for the 2023 Journalism Prize from the Orwell Foundation.
- Third prize for the 2023 True Story Award for Katia Patin's piece "Poland’s ministry of memory spins the Holocaust."
- Shortlisted for the 2023 Woollahra Digital Literary Award for Alexander Wells' report on Australian memory politics.
- A nominee for the 2020 Digital Media Award from One World Media Awards for the multimedia project "Generation Gulag."
- A nominee for the 2018 European Press Prize's Innovation Award for the video series "Jailed for a Like."
- A finalist in the 2016 Online News Association Awards in the category of Excellence and Innovation in Visual Digital Storytelling for a Small Newsroom for its project, "Permission to Exterminate: Terror in Central Asia."

== Partners ==
Coda has collaborated with various other news outlets in its reporting:

- The Guardian
- EurasiaNet
- Magnum Photos and the Edgelands Institute
- Reveal from the Center for Investigative Reporting
- World Policy Institute
- Spektr.press
- Ukrayinska Pravda
- Hetq Online
- blog The Interpreter
- New Lines Magazine
- Rappler
- Lighthouse Reports
- 1843
- Noema Magazine
- Exactly Right Podcast Network
- Audible

=== Memberships ===
- Global Investigative Journalism Network
- Institute for Nonprofit News
