= Alexey Kovalev (journalist) =

Russian journalist and translator

- Алексей Ковалёв
- Born: 26 April 1981; Moscow (Soviet Union)
- Education: Philological Faculty of Moscow State University, City, University of London
- Occupations: Journalist, translator, media manager, pundit
- Employer: Meduza (2019–2023)
- Father: Andrey Kovalyov
- Awards: Redkollegia (Who and how is sawing millions on the deception of Muscovites, 2017); Redkollegia (It’s good to be the president, 2021); Redkollegia (‘I can do whatever I want to you’, 2022)

Alexey (Note: Sometimes transcribed to English as Alexei, Aleksei or Aleksey) Andreevich Kovalev (Note: Sometimes transcribed to English as Kovalyov) (Russian: Алексей Андреевич Ковалёв) is a Russian journalist, translator, media manager and commentator. He is former the head of investigative desk at Meduza, former editor-in-chief of Russian Coda Media and former editor-in-chief of inoSMI.

== Early life and career ==
Alexey Kovalev was born in Moscow in a family of art historians. He graduated from the Faculty of Philology of Moscow State University and later from the Faculty of Journalism of City, University of London.

In London, he was writing articles for Wired and The Guardian and has been a correspondent for the Snob magazine since March 2011.

Kovalev moved to Moscow and from 1 March 2012 to 9 December 2013 was the editor-in-chief of the inoSMI website, which publishes translations of foreign media articles. inoSMI is part of RIA Novosti, a Russian state-controlled news agency, and formally Kovalev was the head of the department at RIA Novosti. He was fired as a result of the formal liquidation of RIA Novosti and news agency's transfer under the control of Rossiya Segodnya, a Russian state-controlled media group.

In September 2014, Kovalev launched The Noodle Remover project (Russian: Лапшеснималочная), which fought against fake news. Also, until 1 March 2019, he was the editor-in-chief of the Russian version of the Coda Media website.

Since March 2019, he has been the head of the investigative desk of the Meduza website. By this time, The Noodle Remover became inactive. From 2023 is not an employee of the Meduza.

Kovalev has also written for The Moscow Times and The New York Times.

== Awards ==
Redkollegia:

- in June 2017 for the article "Who and how is sawing millions on the deception of Muscovites" (Russian: Кто и как распиливает миллионы на обмане москвичей);
- in January 2021, together with Lilia Yapparova, Denis Dmitriev and Mikhail Maglov, for the article "It's good to be the president";
- in April 2022, together with Anastasia Chumakova, Damir Nigmatullin, and Liliya Yapparova, for the article "I can do whatever I want to you".
