= Farida Rustamova =

Russian journalist

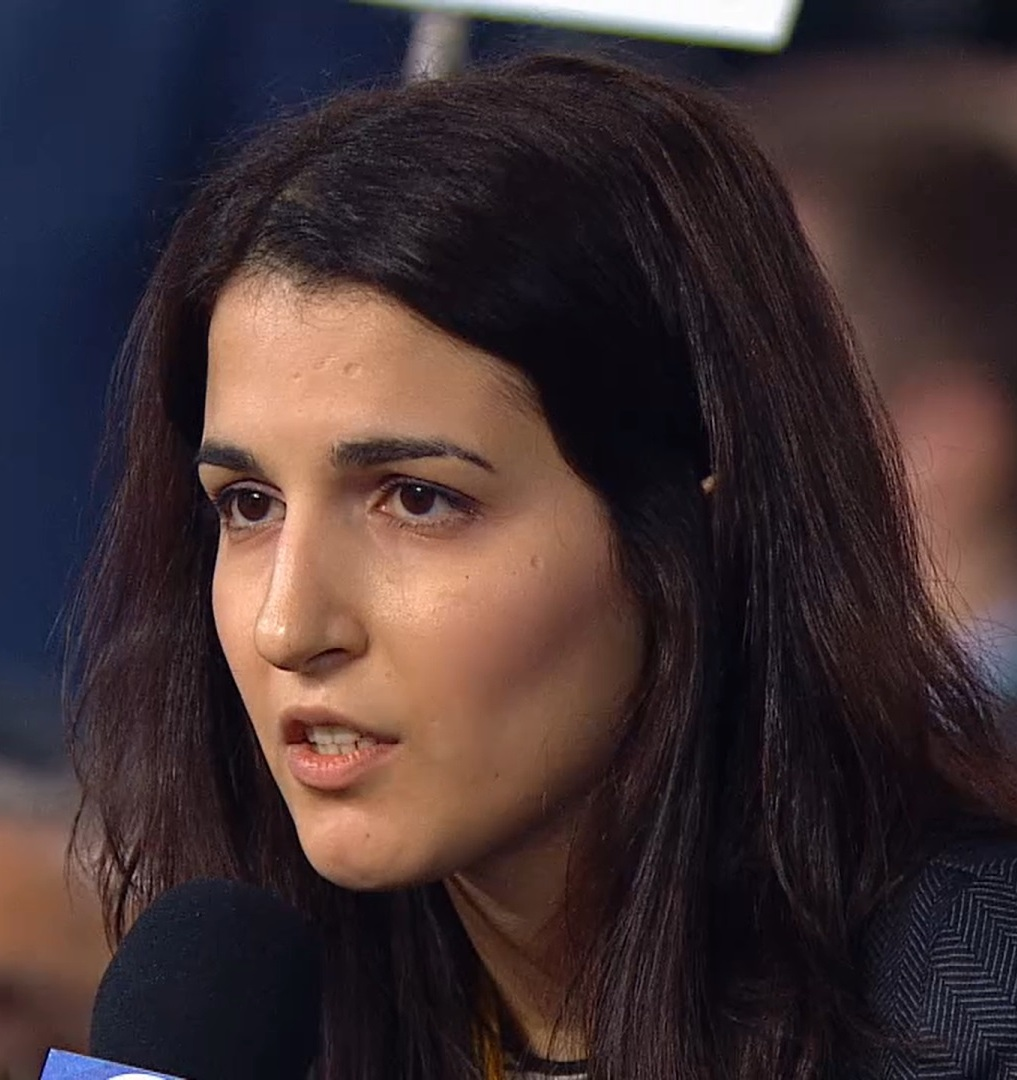
- at Vladimir Putin’s annual news conference, 2019
- Born: 1992 (age 33–34); Moscow, Russian Federation

Farida Hafiz qizy Rustamova (Azerbaijani: Fəridə Xafiz qızı Rüstəmova; Russian: Фарида́ Хафи́з кызы́ Руста́мова; born 1992) is a Russian journalist of Azerbaijani descent.

== Biography ==
Rustamova was born in Moscow in 1992. From 2012 to 2014, while she was studying in university, she was employed at Gazeta.ru.

Since the beginning of the Russian invasion of Ukraine, Rustamova has been working as an independent journalist through her Substack publications Faridaily and Пояснительная записка, Poyasnitelnaya zapiska ("explanatory note"), together with Maxim Tovkailo, publishing texts in both Russian and English. She previously worked for Vedomosti, Forbes Russia, RBK Group, BBC News Russian, Meduza, and TV Rain.

=== Professional work ===
Rustamova has published a number of investigative pieces on President Vladimir Putin and his inner circle, which have been cited by world-known mass media.

Her articles have appeared in The New York Times, The Daily Telegraph, El Confidencial, The Moscow Times, The Blueprint, on the websites of the Wilson Center's Kennan Institute and OpenDemocracy and others.

== Awards ==
Rustamova is a two-time winner of the Redkollegia Award:

- in May 2018 for 'The story of how MP Slutsky sexually harassed two Russian journalists' for BBC News Russian;
- in March 2021 along with Svetlana Reiter and Alexander Ershov for the 'From gene bombs to classroom curriculum' for Meduza.
