= Andrey Zakharov (journalist) =

Russian journalist

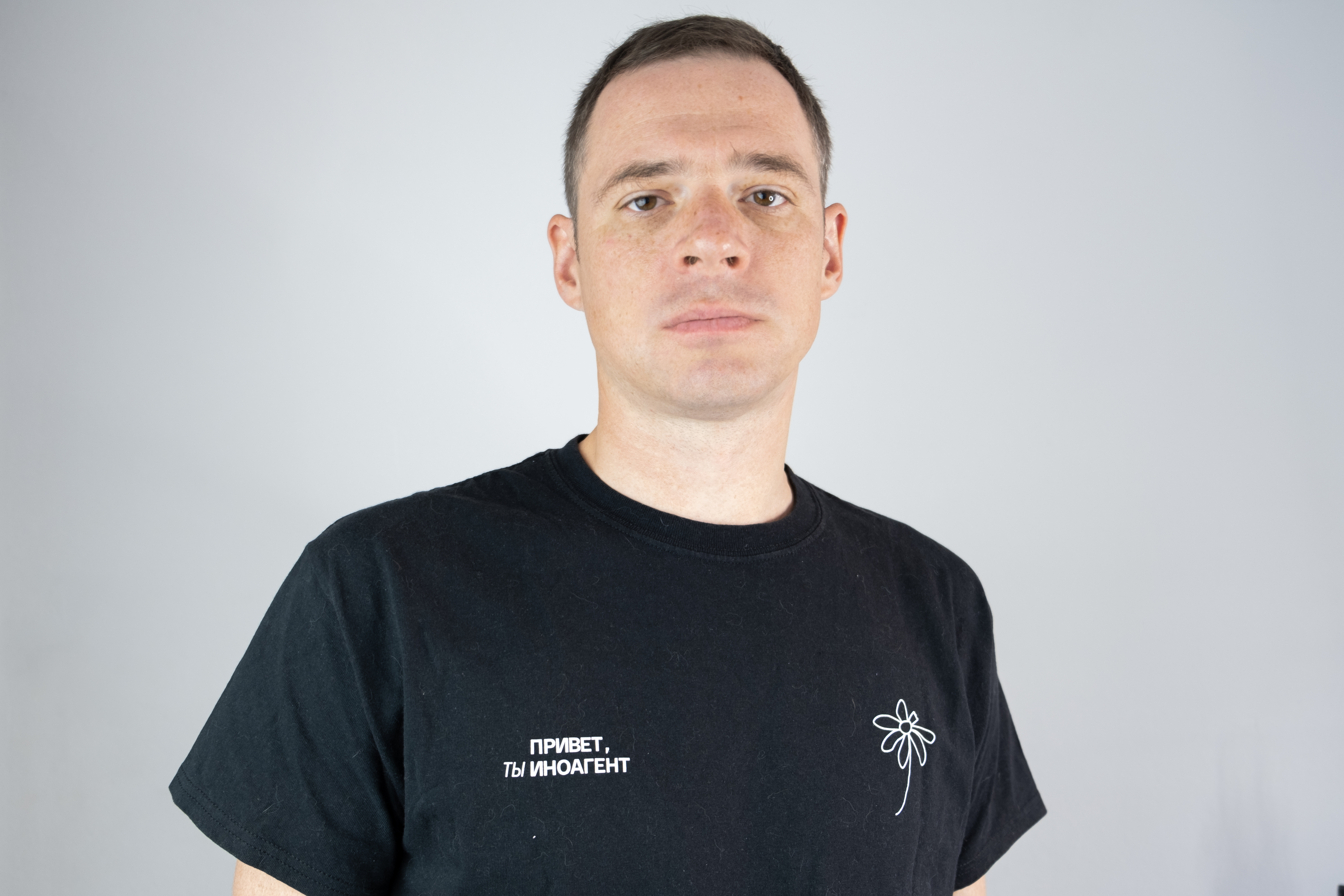
- Андрей Захаров
- Born: Saint Petersburg
- Alma mater: Saint Petersburg State University
- Employer: BBC News Russian (2018–2022); RBK Group (2016–2018)
- Awards: Redkollegia (2017); Redkollegia (2017); Redkollegia (2020); Klebnikov Fellowship (2020); Redkollegia (2022)

Andrey Vyacheslavovich Zakharov (Russian: Андрей Вячеславович Захаров; born in Saint Petersburg) is a Russian investigative journalist, special correspondent of BBC News Russian, and four-time winner of the Redkollegia journalism award.

== Biography ==
Zakharov graduated from the Saint Petersburg State University in 2005 with a degree in history of arts.

In 2010–2016 he worked as a correspondent at the Fontanka News agency. While working at Fontanka, Zakharov published an investigation into Yevgeny Prigozhin's troll factory.

In 2016, Zakharov moved to Moscow. In 2016–2018, he worked as a special correspondent for the RBK magazine, where he published an investigation on the Russian interference in the 2016 United States elections.

In 2018–2022, Zakharov was a special correspondent for BBC News Russian.

While working at Proekt in 2020–2021, Zakharov authored an article revealing Vladimir Putin's alleged affair with Svetlana Krivonogikh.

In October 2021, the Ministry of Justice of the Russian Federation included Zakharov into the list of foreign agents. Shortly after, he left Russia and moved to the United Kingdom.

== Awards ==
Zakharov is a two-time winner (in 2014 and 2015) of the Union's of Journalists of St. Petersburg and the Leningrad Region "Golden Pen" award.

He is also a four-time winner (twice in 2017, in 2020, and 2022) of the Redkollegiya award.
