= Roman Anin =

Russian investigative journalist

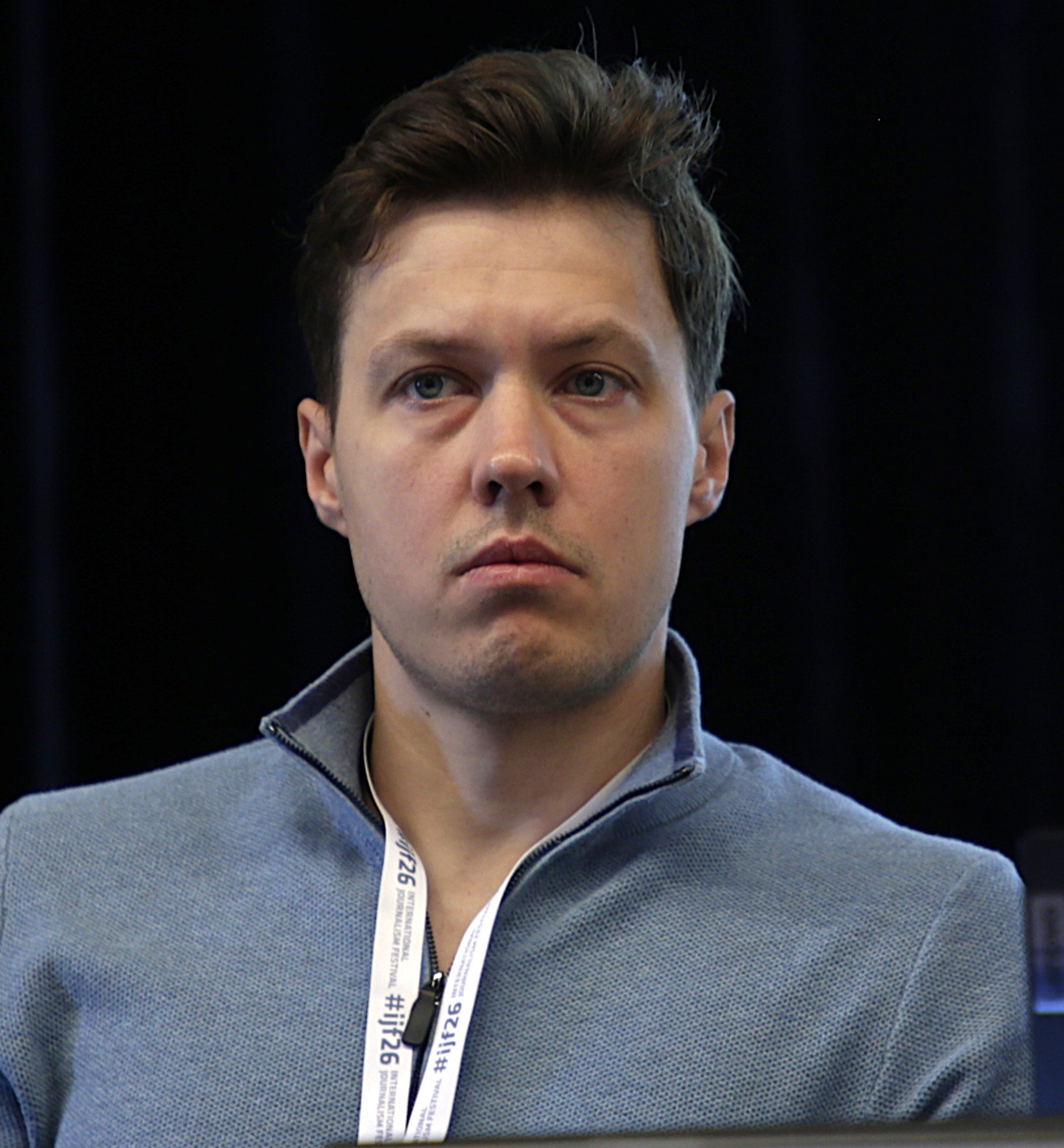
- Born: 16 December 1986; Chișinău
- Education: MSU Faculty of Journalism, Institute of Oriental Studies of the Russian Academy of Sciences, John S. Knight Journalism Fellowships at Stanford
- Occupations: Investigative journalist, reporter, journalist
- Employer: iStories (2020–)
- Notable work: Secrecy for Sale: Inside the Global Offshore Money Maze, Panama Papers, Paradise Papers
- Awards: Awards

Roman Aleksandrovich (Note: or Alexandrovich) Anin (Russian: Роман Александрович Анин; born 16 December 1986) is a Russian investigative journalist. He is one of the founders of the independent iStories outlet and a former journalist for the Russian newspaper Novaya Gazeta. The main investigation in which he was involved is the investigation of the Panama Papers.

The Russian government has stripped Anin of his Russian citizenship for journalism that does not fit the government's narratives.

== Early life ==
Anin was born in Moldova. He gained Russian citizenship in 2006.

== Career ==
Anin's journalistic career began in 2006, in the sports department of the Novaya Gazeta newspaper. In 2008, he started working in the investigation department of Novaya Gazeta. In 2010, Anin graduated from the MSU Faculty of Journalism, admission to which was connected with the desire to become a football commentator. He also studied at the Institute of Oriental Studies of the Russian Academy of Sciences as a Ph.D. candidate in global economics.

Since 2009, Anin has been working with the International Consortium of Investigative Journalists and the Organized Crime and Corruption Reporting Project. He is also teaches students at the Higher School of Economics in Moscow, Russia. In 2018–2019, Anin studied under the John S. Knight Journalism Fellowships at Stanford programme.

In 2020, Anin launched the iStories investigative outlet. As part of his investigative activities, he collaborated with Reuters, The Guardian, and the BBC. While the main investigation in which Anin was involved is the Panama Papers case, he himself considers his most important investigation to be the investigation into the Russian intelligence generals of the Federal Security Service (FSB).

On 20 August 2021, Roman Anin, IStories and five journalists were labelled as "foreign agents" in Russia. The day before, the Russian messaging app Telegram blocked Anin's account without explaining the reasons.

On 17 June 2024, a Moscow court issued an arrest warrant for Anin on a charge of spreading "false information" about the Russian armed forces in Ukraine. Russia's Interior Ministry added Anin to its wanted list.

== Awards and honours ==
2012: Julian Semenov Award; Artyom Borovik award; diploma of the Andrey Sakharov award.

The 2013 ICFJ Knight International Journalism Award for "his work in probing cases of crime and cronyism in Russia, the repercussions of which have led to further investigations by other countries and the European Union".

2015: Sergei Magnitsky Human Rights Award; Society of American Business Editors and Writers Award in the category of "Best in Business – International-Investigative" as a member of the Reuters investigative group.

2017: Pulitzer Prize as a member of the Panama Papers investigative group.

2018: Redkollegia award together with Russian journalist Olesya Shmagun for their article Сынки Отечества, Synki Otechestva, 'Sons of the Fatherland'.

2019: Finalist of Global Shining Light Award.

2020: ICFJ Knight Trailblazer Award for launching iStories.

The 2021 European Press Prize Investigative Reporting Award for the Kirill and Katya: Love, offshores, and administrative resources. How marrying Putin’s daughter gave Kirill Shamalov a world of opportunity article.

== Personal life ==
Anin was born on 16 December 1986 in Chișinău, Moldova. His grandfather was labelled as an "enemy of the people" and spent 15 years in prison.
