= OVD-Info =

Russian human rights media project

- Native name: ОВД-Инфо
- Type: Nonprofit non-governmental organization
- Founded: December 2011; 14 years ago
- Founder: Grigory Okhotin and Daniil Beilinson
- Area served: Russia
- Number of employees: ~7000 volunteers as of 2023, undisclosed number of staff
- Website: en.ovdinfo.org

OVD-Info (Russian: ОВД-Инфо) is an independent Russian human rights media project aimed at combating political persecution. Its main focus is freedom of assembly. OVD-Info is one of Russia's largest human rights NGOs.

== History ==
OVD-Info was founded in December 2011 by Moscow journalist Grigory Okhotin and programmer Daniil Beilinson. They witnessed mass arrests of participants in the pro-democracy rally on December 5, 2011. Okhotin and Beilinson then posted the total number of detainees and their names on Facebook. The post went viral, and seeing the demand for their work, by December 10, on the eve of the rally on Bolotnaya Square in Moscow, Okhotin and Beilinson launched the OVD-Info website.

The name of the project comes from the abbreviation Department of Internal Affairs (Russian: Отдел Внутренних Дел), which is what police departments are often called in Russia. "OVD-Info" thus means "information about the police".

Since 1 February 2013, the main partner of the project is the Nobel-winning Memorial Human Rights Center. In 2013, the Prosecutor's Office of the Russian Federation demanded that Memorial register as a foreign agent, since it receives funding from abroad to support OVD-Info, which was regarded by the prosecutor's office as partisan. According to the prosecutor's office, some of OVD-Info's data on political persecutions is not objective. OVD-Info says that it is not partisan.

On 29 September 2021 the Ministry of Justice of the Russian Federation designated OVD-Info as a "foreign agent". The decision was criticised as politically motivated and intended to stifle dissent.

On 25 December 2021 the Federal Service for Supervision of Communications, Information Technology and Mass Media (Roskomnadzor) blocked the website of OVD-Info after a court ruling. A representative for OVD-Info said that they had not received any notifications from the government and the reason for the blocking was unknown to them.

After the 2022 Russian invasion of Ukraine, OVD-Info expanded its mandate to help anti-war protesters. It extensively covered non-violent anti-war resistance in Russia and provided legal aid to anti-war activists.

In June 2026, OVD-Info is designated as an extremist organization.

== Services ==
=== Monitoring ===
OVD-Info monitors politically motivated persecutions and cases of abuse of authority by Russian police. OVD-Info publishes information in the form of digests and stories told by the victims themselves.

=== Legal aid ===
The project provides legal aid in the form of consultations and a 24/7 hotline (through the hotline the project receives most of the information, which it then publishes in its bulletins on the website), lawyer visits to custody, legal defense in courts (up to filing complaints to European Court of Human Rights).

=== Newsletters ===
OVD-Info published a weekly English-language newsletter that monitors and explains Russia's crackdown on human rights as well as activists’ struggles. OVD-Info's data division publishes a newsletter specifically geared towards experts.

=== Informing ===
The project monitors cases of violence against Russia's political prisoners. The website also maintains a mailing list with reports on political persecution in Russia, along with an English-language newsletter.

OVD-Info publishes lists of detainees. In 2018, the project assisted 660 people in police departments, about 200 people in administrative and 32 in criminal cases.

The project covered many Russian protests. For example, OVD-Info published detailed statistics on arrests at anti-corruption protests in March 2017, at protests against raising the retirement age in 2018. In June 2019, the project played a significant role in drawing public attention to the case of journalist Ivan Golunov. At the same time, the project itself managed to become more widely known — on June 12, 2019, OVD-Info received an average monthly amount of donations in one day. In 2021 OVD-Info covered the crackdown on the pro-Navalny protests, later releasing a film about it. After the full-scale invasion of Ukraine, they have been covering the ongoing crackdowns on the Russian anti-war movement.

=== Research ===
OVD-Info collaborates with media, academia and think tanks, providing data and expertise. Some of the media that used OVD-Info data are the New York Times, Al Jazeera, the Guardian and others. The project publishes reports on Russian authorities’ human rights violations. In 2018–2019, reports were published on the topic of bans of rallies in Russian cities.

== Functioning and financing ==
As of June 2023, OVD-Info leads roughly 7000 volunteers and employs an undisclosed number of staff. OVD-Info provides assistance to those who find themselves under administrative or criminal prosecution for expressing their political position. The project is aimed at the development of civil society an ending repressions in Russia and relies mostly on grassroots donations to operate.

Since 2013 till 2022 the Nobel-winning Memorial Human Rights Center has acted as an infrastructural partner of OVD-Info. From 2015 to the present day, the project has been actively developing their of grassroots donations base. Russian banks — Tinkoff, Alfa-Bank and VTB 24 — refused processing donations to OVD-Info.

2018

OVD-Info managed to attract more than 19.8 million rubles, of which about 5.66 million was attained through crowdfunding.

2019

59.5 million rubles, 64% of which were private donations.

2020

Private donations accounted for 67% of all OVD-Info finances. In total, the project attracted 67 million rubles.

2021

The volume of private donations to the project increased by almost 6 times. In February alone, OVD-Info received 58,000 donations in the amount of 57 million rubles. In total, by the end of 2021, the project was supported by 19 thousand regular donors, in 2021 it raised 247.5 million rubles. private donations.

2023

About 14-17 thousand people have been supporting the project every month.

== Awards ==
July 2019: Redkollegia.

2020: Lew-Kopelew-Preis.

2021: Civil Rights Defender of the Year. Leonid Drabkin (Russian: Леонид Драбкин), Operations Coordinator of OVD-Info, was selected to be a winner in the Forbes 30 Under 30 list in the Social practices category.
