= Maria Borzunova =

Russian journalist (born 1995)

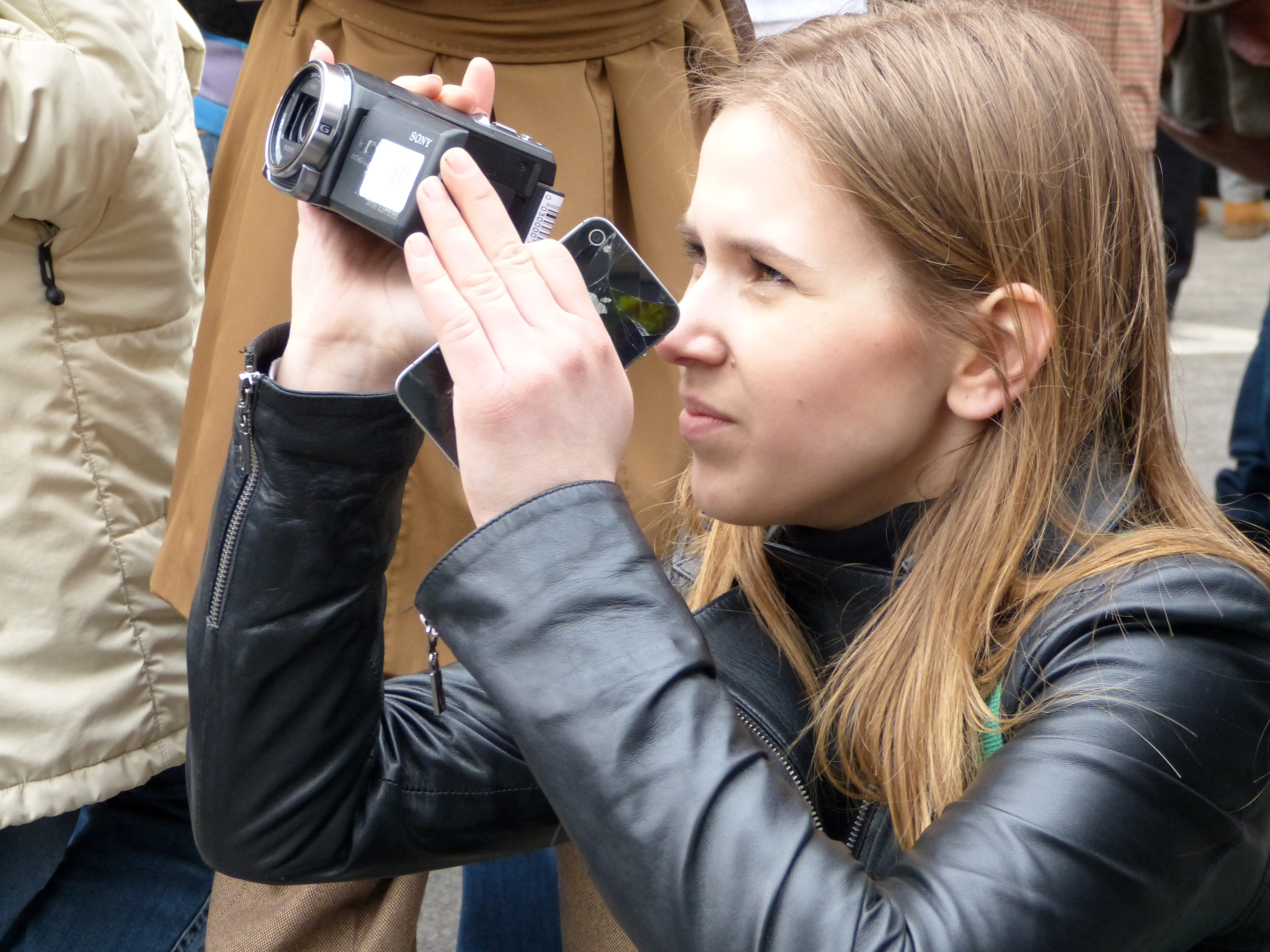
Borzunova in 2014

Maria Mikhailovna Borzunova (Russian: Мария Михайловна Борзунова; born January 14, 1995, Moscow) is a Russian journalist and video blogger.

== Early life and education ==
Born in Moscow on January 14, 1995, Borzunova spent the majority of her childhood in Podolsk. In 2012, she graduated from Lyceum No. 23 in the city of Podolsk, and in 2016, she completed her studies at the Faculty of Communications, Media, and Design at the National Research University Higher School of Economics.

== Career ==
From 2014 to 2023, Borzunova worked at the TV Rain television channel. In 2018, she became the host of the program "Fake News," dedicated to exposing the misinformation spread by Russian media. As she reported in 2019, the Russian media demonstrated the tendency to divert viewers' attention from Russia's inherent problems by focusing on similar conflicts, possibly distorted or taken out of context, in the West. Since 2022, this show has been broadcast not only on TV Rain but also on the French-German channel Arte.

In 2021, she received death threats from the far-right Male State group after she interviewed a same-sex couple.

In March 2022, due to the closure of the TV Rain channel offices in Russia after the beginning of the Russian invasion of Ukraine, she moved to Istanbul and later to Riga.

On April 1, 2022, the Russian Ministry of Justice included Borzunova in the list of foreign agents. According to the journalist, the Ministry of Justice considered transfers of 1290 rubles from American citizen Evan Gershkovich and 10270 rubles from Belarusian citizen Nadine Lakhbabi, who are close friends of hers, as sources of foreign funding.

In February 2023, Borzunova resigned from TV Rain. Since February 27, 2023, Borzunova has been running a YouTube channel. As of December 2023, the channel had 149 thousand subscribers.

== Awards ==
In December 2018, Borzunova became a laureate of the HSE Alumni Award (an award presented to outstanding graduates of this university) in the category "Fourth Estate".

Maria Borzunova has twice been a laureate of the Redkollegia media award for her articles on the Belarusian political immigrants published in January and August 2021.
