= Katerina Gordeeva =

Russian journalist and author

- Катерина Гордеева
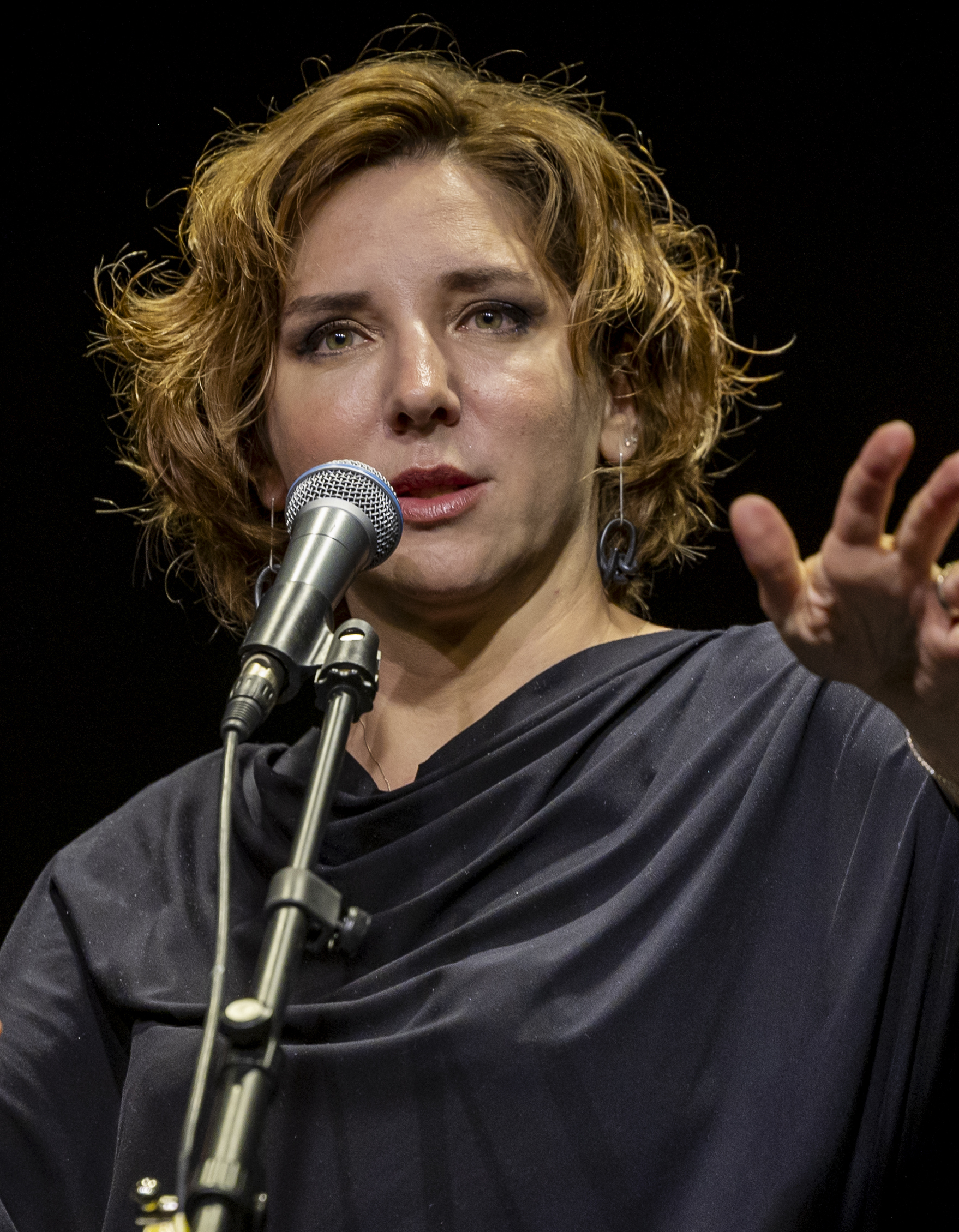
- Gordeeva in 2025
- Born: Katerina Vladimirovna Gordeeva; 23 March 1977 (age 49); Rostov-on-Don, Russian SFSR, Soviet Union
- Education: Rostov State University
- Occupations: Writer, journalist, documentary writer, film producer
- Years active: 1994–present
- Notable work: Change one Life (Video Series), Ruble's Wives, Defeat Cancer, The ZERO Generation
- Spouse: Nikolay Solodnikov (m. 2014)
- Children: 4
- Website: Her YouTube channel

Katerina Vladimirovna Gordeeva (Russian: Катерина Владимировна Гордеева; born 23 March 1977) is a Russian journalist, documentary writer and author. She is most known for the work involved with Russia's NTV Documentary films from 2003 until 2012. Since 2005, she has directed and released several documentaries. Gordeeva's documentaries cover a list of different topics including health, family and social issues. Her first documentary Ruble's Wives was released in 2005.

== Early life and education ==
Gordeeva was born in Rostov-on-Don in 1977. She was always interested in becoming a paediatric surgeon. She worked as a nurse throughout the summer holidays when she was 12 years old in the 20th City Hospital in Rostov-on-Don. She then went to work at the department of neonatal pathology in Rostov NIIAP.

She started her career in journalism when she became a correspondent for one of Rostov-on-Don's local newspapers 'City N'. In 1993, Gordeeva tried to study in Paris but with changes to her place in Rostov-on-Don, she went back home. In 1994, Gordeeva then studied Journalism at the Rostov State University in Rostov-on-Don. In 1999, she graduated from the Faculty of Journalism at Moscow's State University.

== Career ==
=== Television ===
Gordeevas career in Television started in 1995. She worked as an editor, correspondent and author of the Russian TV Program 'Theme/Тема' until 1996. In 1997, she worked as one of the authors for the NTV program 'Originally from childhood'.

From 1997 to 1999, she worked as a parliamentary correspondent for the TV program 'Day Seven' with then later working at the Russian Service of the BBC in 2001 under the pseudonym Maria Rasskazova.

In July 2002, she reverted to her own name to start working at Russia's TVS TV Channel. This channel however ceased broadcast in 2003. From 2004 until 2006, she worked as a correspondent at Russia's NTV Program 'Today'.

=== Documentary career ===
Gordeeva started producing her first documentary film in 2005. Her first film was titled 'Ruble's Wives'. Since then, she has released various documentaries and films about various topics inside Russia. Most of the films are focused on families and people.

=== Publications ===
Gordeeva published in 2023 her book on witnesses of the invasion of Ukraine by Russia. It was translated in 2023 in Dutch.

From September 2020 she was the host of the YouTube- Show „Tell Gordeeva“, starting in cooperation with Meduza. After Meduza became labelled a ″foreign agent″ she continued the talkshow independently. In 2022 she became a ″foreign agent″ herself. She continued her talkshow until February 2024 when one of her guests was arrested. In her talkshow she had Dmitry Muratov, Natalia Poklonskaya or Grigory Yudin as a guest, among others.

== Filmography ==
- The Man from Nowhere (Человек из ниоткуда) 2018
- Change one Life (Измени одну жизнь) 2017
- Joseph's Children (Дети Иосифа) 2015
- Vote (Голоса) 2014
- The girls are flying (Девочки летят) 2012
- Defeat Cancer (Победить рак) 2012
- The ZERO Generation (Поколение НОЛЬ) 2010
- We are not vegetables (Мы не овощи) 2010
- Nevsky (Невский) 2009
- Further ... Silence (Дальше — тишина) 2009
- When leaving, extinguish the light (Уходя, гасите свет) 2009
- Explosion (Взрыв) 2008
- Kind People (Люди добрые) 2007
- Saddam - Invited to be executed (Саддам. Приглашение на казнь) 2007
- Knockin 'on Heaven (Достучаться до небес) 2006
- Life on Loan (Жизнь взаймы) 2005
- Ruble's Wives (Рублёвские жёны) 2005

== Personal life ==
Gordeeva married Nikolay Solodnikov in 2014. She has four children. Gordeeva speaks English, French and Italian. She resides in Latvia as well as Russia.
