= Pavel Kanygin =

Russian journalist (born 1987)

- Павел Каныгин
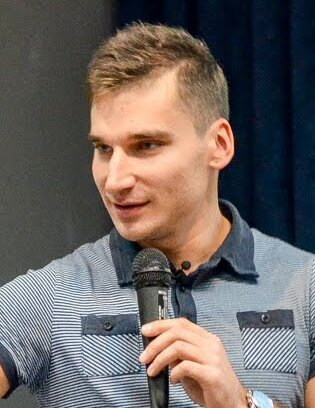
- Kanygin in 2017
- Born: January 30, 1987 (age 39); Neftekamsk, Bashkir ASSR, Soviet Union
- Education: Moscow State University

Pavel Yurievich Kanygin (Russian: Павел Юрьевич Каныгин, IPA: [ˈpavʲɪɫ ˈjʉrʲɪ̯ɪvʲɪt͡ɕ kɐˈnɨɡʲɪn]; born 30 January 1987) is a Russian journalist and media-manager. Former investigative journalist, special correspondent, and executive producer of Novaya Gazeta. From 2022, editor-in-chief of the Prodolzheniye Sleduyet ("To Be Continued") media.

== Biography ==
Kanygin was born on 30 January 1987 in Neftekamsk, Bashkir ASSR. He started his journalistic activity in the weekly regional newspaper Vecherniy Neftekamsk in the high school. In 2004, he moved to Moscow, studied at the Faculty of Journalism of Moscow State University and worked in the newspaper Moskovskie Novosti and Moskovsky Komsomolets. He has been a correspondent for Novaya Gazeta since October 2004.

In 2014–2015, he covered the war in Donbas. In May 2014, while reporting on the falsified referendum on self-determination of the Russia-controlled Donetsk People's Republic, Kanygin was kidnapped by its representatives, who demanded a ransom of 30,000 US dollars; subsequently, the journalist was released by the separatists for one thousand. In June 2015, during a reporting trip to Donbas, he was arrested and beaten by representatives of the DPR state security.

Since 2015, over the course of several years, he conducted an investigation into the downing of the MH17 flight over Donbas.

In the spring of 2017, Kanygin released an investigation about the Russian general, head of the DPR military intelligence, Sergey Dubinsky, and his involvement in the downing of MH17.

In 2019, his article published in Novaya Gazeta included documents on the movement of a column of military equipment from the Kursk air defense brigade, including a Buk missile system, to the border with Ukraine.

Kanygin interned at the Harriman Institute as a Klebnikov Russian Civil Society Fellow in 2016.

He won a Nieman Journalism Foundation Fellowship at Harvard University in 2019.

In 2021, as executive producer he published a documentary How Anna Was Killed, about the murder of his colleague, Novaya Gazeta veteran Anna Politkovskaya.

On 14 April 2023, Kanygin was deemed in the list of foreign agents by the Russian Ministry of Justice.

From the outset of Russia's full-scale invasion of Ukraine, Kanygin openly condemned the Kremlin's actions. After the temporary closure of Novaya Gazeta, he announced the launch of the independent media project Prodolzhenie Sleduet (“To Be Continued”).

Due to the risk of arrest, he left Russia soon after.

== Awards and recognition ==
- December 2018: Redkollegia award for "Khachaturyan. Pistol Dance"
- July 2017: Redkollegia award for "I believed we weren't there in Ukraine.".
- 2017: Andrei Sakharov Prize "For Journalism as a Deed".
- 2016: Paul Klebnikov Russian Civil Society Fellowship at the Harriman Institute.
- 2015: "Journalist of the year", by Chernovik newspaper.
- 2014: Tamirlan Kazikhanov Award "For Courage and Professionalism" of the Russian Union of Journalists.
