= Yury Dud =

Russian journalist and YouTuber

- Юрий Дудь
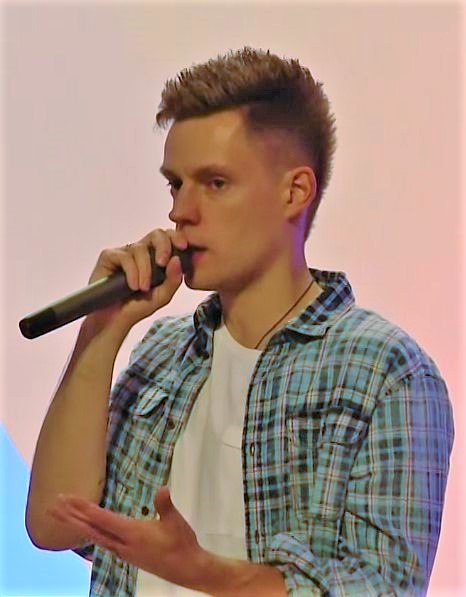
- Dud in 2017
- Born: 11 October 1986 (age 40); Potsdam, East Germany
- Education: Moscow State University
- Occupations: Journalist; interviewer

YouTube information
- Channel: вДудь
- Subscribers: 10.3 million
- Views: 2.41 billion
- Last updated: 21 October 2025

Yury Aleksandrovich Dud (Russian: Юрий Александрович Дудь, Russian pronunciation: [dutʲ], also spelled Yuri Dud; born 11 October 1986) is a German-born Russian journalist known primarily for his informational online videos he distributes as a YouTuber. He has been deputy director-general of the sports website Sports.ru since 2018, having previously served as the editor-in-chief from 2011 to 2018.

In 2017, Dud launched his YouTube channel, vDud (Russian: вДудь), where he interviews individuals from Russia and other post-Soviet states. He is one of the most popular YouTubers in Russia, with vDud having over ten million subscribers as of early 2022. His series of socio-political interviews have included multiple opponents of the 2022 Russian invasion of Ukraine and related foreign policies of the nation. This has brought him attention from worldwide audiences and opposition from Vladimir Putin's government. On 11 April 2022, Dud released Человек во время войны (English: Man in the Time of War / Man in War), a film project based upon his research into the Ukrainian refugee crisis.

== Early life and family ==
Dud was born on 11 October 1986 in the city of Potsdam in East Germany to Alexander Petrovich Dud, the head of Bauman Moscow State Technical University's military department and professor of military science, and Anna Stepanovna Dud, a schoolteacher of chemistry. In 1990, his family moved to Moscow. Dud has lived in Russia since the age of four. He considers himself to be of Ukrainian origin and particularly Russian by identity.

== Career ==
=== Early career ===
Dud played football as a child and dreamt of becoming a goalkeeper, but had to stop playing because of asthma. However, this passion got him interested in sports journalism. In 2001, Dud began working at the Russian newspaper Izvestia as a freelance journalist; he became a staff journalist at the age of 16. In 2007, Dud began working for the sports magazine PROSPORT.ru, which was then in the sports division of NTV Plus. In 2008, he graduated from the MSU Faculty of Journalism.

From 2011 to 2013, Dud hosted the TV show Headbutt (Удар головой) on Russia-2. From 2015 to 2017, he hosted the show KultTura (КультТура) on the newly launched TV channel Match TV. The show was taken off the air due to poor ratings and a lack of sponsors.

From 2011 to 2018, Dud was editor-in-chief of Sports.ru. In 2018, he moved to the position of deputy director-general.

=== vDud ===
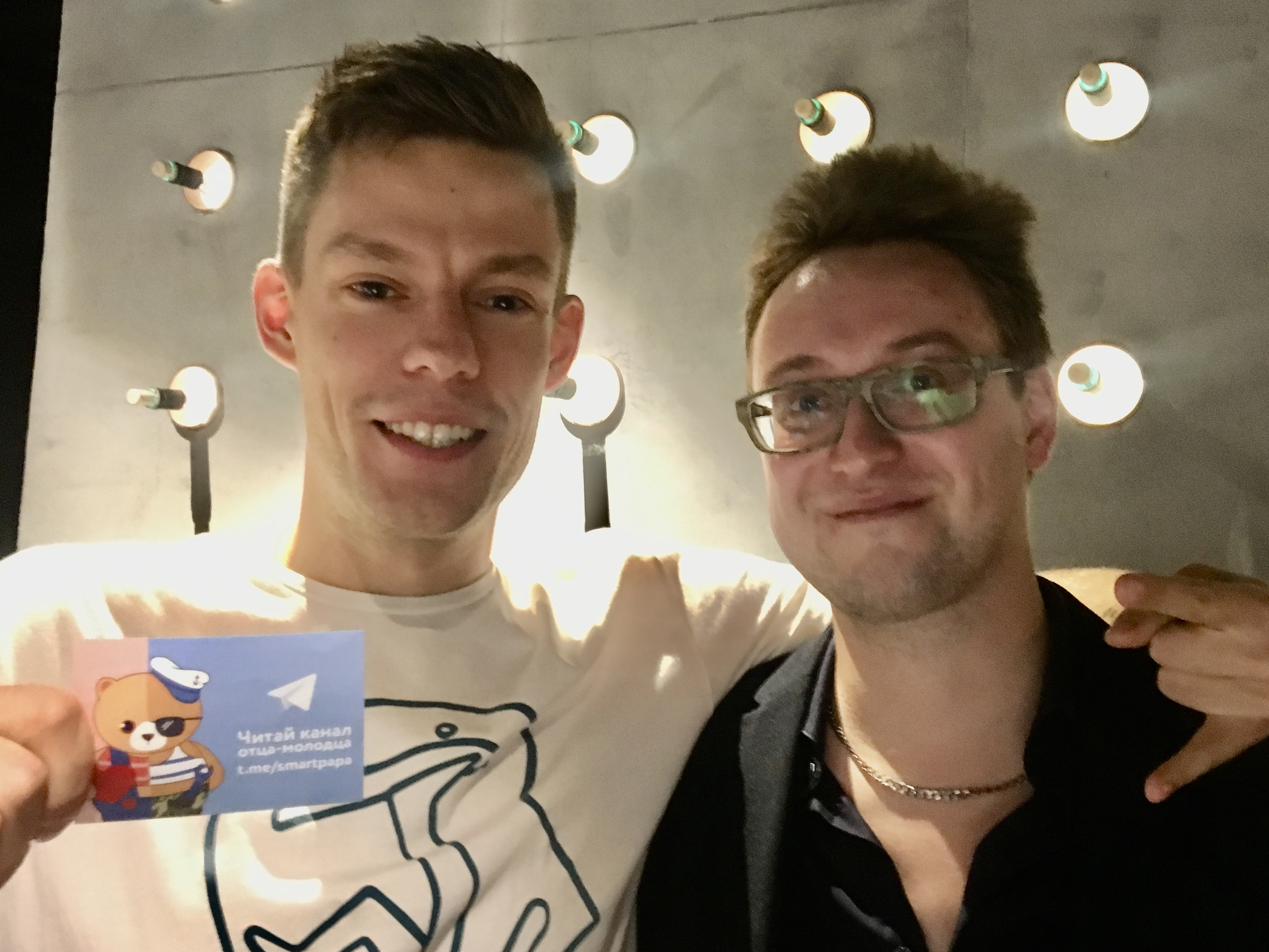
Dud (left) in 2018

In February 2017, Dud launched the YouTube channel vDud (вДудь), where he interviews famous figures, including musicians (mainly rappers), politicians, journalists, film directors, and businesspeople. The channel quickly became a success; his 2018 interview with influencer Nastya Ivleeva received over 30 million views. By June 2020, the channel received over one billion views.

In September 2019, Dud was awarded GQ Russia's Person of the Year prize in the Face From the Screen category. In his speech at the ceremony, he urged his colleagues to break the silence around police brutality, corruption, and election rigging. The next day, the Kremlin's spokesman, Dmitry Peskov, told media that he does not advise for those words to be projected onto the whole of society.

By 2021, Dud became the most popular Russian blogger. In his article "D — Dud" ("Д — Дудь") as part of his "Words of Russia" project ("Слова России"), Yury Saprykin wrote that Dud became a voice of the new generation in his country. In his interviews, he openly speaks with guests on topics that are not represented in state media. Saprykin stated that Dud, through his work, reinvents recent Russian history and presents it without state propaganda. By November 2021, the channel had more almost 10 million subscribers and his 2020 documentary How the World's IT Capital Works had received over 40 million views. Forbes estimated Dud's annual income in 2021 to be $1.8 million.

On 17 June 2021, the authorities opened a case against Dud for allegedly distributing "drug propaganda" in his interviews with a Ukrainian blogger and a Russian rapper; Dud had included the disclaimer "drugs are evil, don't consume them" at the beginning of the videos. In October, he was sentenced to a 100,000 ruble (US$2,000) fine. Dud tried to appeal the ruling, but the Moscow City Court declined his appeal.

Following a mass crackdown in Belarus on the media, the GUBOPiK of the Belarusian interior ministry labelled three videos on his channel as extremist in 2022. The videos were about stand-up comedian Slava Komissarenko, who fled Belarus and openly opposes the government of Alexander Lukashenko. The Committee to Protect Journalists criticized the decision and called on Belarusian authorities to reverse it and "stop using the country's extremism legislation to silence independent journalism". On April 27, 2026, the entire YouTube channel was designated as extremist material in Belarus.

== Documentaries ==
Over time, Dud's YouTube channel grew from one-on-one interviews to documentary films on social issues and recent Russian history.

=== Kolyma ===
In April 2019, the documentary film Kolyma was published which is about Stalinist repressions in the region of Kolyma and the emergence of the Gulag camps and their legacy.

=== Beslan. Remember ===
In September 2019, a film about the victims and survivors of the Beslan school siege in 2004 was released. In the opening of the film, Dud states: "Our state made mistakes that led to this tragedy. By giving maximum care to the victims it can earn forgiveness and, later, trust of its people". The film is based on interviews of witnesses, hostages, journalists, and bureaucrats who were there during the tragedy, including Ruslan Aushev, the sole negotiator who entered the sieged school and led 26 hostages outside. The film received over 10 million views in four days on YouTube. Its release marked the 15th anniversary of the Beslan tragedy, where no documentaries or reports were given that day on state channels.

Criticism from state media followed the release of the film with Vladimir Solovyov being one of the most vocal. The newspaper Argumenty i Fakty accused Dud of whitewashing the terrorists. Dmitry Sokolov-Mitrich, who witnessed the events, criticized Dud for what he called was a biased description of the storming of the school by Russian forces. Independent publications including Novaya Gazeta praised the documentary for what it described as a professional, calm, and thoroughly detailed analysis.

=== HIV in Russia: An Epidemic No One Talks About ===
In February 2020, HIV in Russia: An Epidemic No One Talks About was published, receiving over 13 million views in its first week of release. Initially, Dud's team wanted to tell its audience how to not become part of the statistics where over one million people in Russia live with HIV. But during the production of the film, they understood the issue of constant condemnation and discrimination against those living with HIV. After its release, the politician Fedot Tumusov organized a screening in the State Duma in order to motivate other deputies to work on the issue. The head of the Audit Chamber of Russia, Alexei Kudrin, ordered his department to carefully examine support measures provided to those living with HIV in the country. According to Google Analytics, searches for HIV tests in Russia increased by 56 times after the film was released. The head of the Federal Centre for the Prevention and Control of the Spread of AIDS, Vadim Pokrovsky told media that the number of people willing to perform HIV tests doubled.

=== How the World's IT Capital Works ===
In April 2020, a film about Silicon Valley Russian-speaking entrepreneurs was released. Many of them (like Mikita Mikado or Andrey Doronichev from Google) were yet unknown to wide Russian audience and 'woke up famous' with social network accounts bursting with thousands of new followers. Although the film was generally praised, it was criticized for making the Silicon Valley business environment seem too positive, as it did not tell the story of hardship and failure.

=== Why They Torture in Russia ===
In December 2021, a film about torture in modern-day Russia was released. In the film, Dud interviews victims of torture as well as human rights activists and organizations. The film opens up on the issue of violence and torture in Russia's penitential facilities that stay undisclosed and uninvestigated, where often the victims are unable to sue their offenders. Even in those cases that are opened, the offenders are usually acquitted.

=== Man in War ===
On 11 April 2022, a film about the work of volunteers helping refugees from Ukraine titled Человек во время войны (English: Man in the Time of War / Man in War) came out based on Dud's research.

== Personal life ==
Dud is married to Olga Dud (née Boneva) and has two children.

In February 2022, after Russia launched its invasion of Ukraine, Dud condemned the invasion and publicly called for Russian troops to be withdrawn from Ukraine; his anti-war Facebook post received over 1 million likes. Dud described the invasion as an "imperial frenzy" that he does not want to be a part of. A complaint about his anti-war posts were filed to the Prosecutor-General of Russia's Office and Ministry of Justice, calling for Dud to be designated as a "foreign agent".

On 15 April 2022, Dud was designated by the Ministry of Justice as a "foreign agent" for speaking out against the war in Ukraine and not long after he left the country. As of May 2022 he was continuing to work from Istanbul. On 22 July 2025, Dud was tried in absentia, under the foreign agent law (Article 330.1). State media claims he was added to the wanted list as well.

== Awards ==
- 2016 – Winner of GQ Russia's Person of the Year award in the Face from TV category with Yevgeny Savin
- 2017 – Winner of GQ Russia's Person of the Year award in the Face From the Screen category
- 2017 – Laureate of Redkollegia's prize in October
- 2019 – Winner of GQ Russia's Person of the Year award in the Face From the Screen category
- 2020 – Forbes Life Hero of the Year Award

== See also ==
- Documentary filmmaker
- Opposition to Vladimir Putin in Russia
- YouTuber

== Sources ==
- Pinkham, Sophie (6 September 2021). "HIV in Russia. Dir. Yuri Dud΄. YouTube film, 2020. 108 minutes. Color". Slavic Review. 80 (2): 394–395. doi:10.1017/slr.2021.102. S2CID 239737259.
- Dovzhik, Galina; Dovzhik, Valeriy; Kurasova, Olga (2021). "Empathy and Identification as an Online Technology of Blogger's Communication in Digital Marketing". Socio-economic Systems: Paradigms for the Future. Studies in Systems, Decision and Control. Vol. 314. pp. 1291–1298. doi:10.1007/978-3-030-56433-9_135. ISBN 9783030564339. S2CID 234169701.
