= Spektr.press =

Russian-language news website from Latvia

Спектр
- Available in: Russian
- Website: spektr.press
- Launched: 2014

Spektr.press is a Russian language online news journal based in Riga, Latvia. Established in 2014 by Anton Lysenkov, former journalist from prominent Russian-language website Lenta.ru.

Spektr.press is a multi-laureate of the Redkollegia Russian language journalistic award. Dmitry Durnev of the Spektr was awarded in 2020, 2021, and two times in 2022.

According to Lysenkov, the website is supported by Baltic news website Delfi.

According to Journalismfund Europe "the project materials are presented in several formats: professional expertise, reportage and interviews in text and video".

Among the Spektr's columnists are: Valery Panyushkin, Lyudmila Petranovskaya, Galina Timchenko (Meduza founder, Lysenkov's former chief at former Lenta.ru) and others.
