= 7x7 (website) =

Russian news website

- Website type: News website
- Available in: 2 languages
- List of languages Russian, English
- Predecessors: Interregional Internet magazine "7x7": news, opinions, blogs
- Country of origin: Russia
- Owner: Leonid Zilberg
- Editor: Oleg Grigorenko
- Website: semnasem.org
- Launched: 2010; 16 years ago
- Current status: Active

7x7. Horizontal Russia (Seven by seven) is a Russian independent news website based in the Komi Republic and operating in 31 regions of the European part of Russia.

== History ==
The website was founded in 2010 in the city of Syktyvkar, Komi Republic, under the name "Interregional Internet magazine "7x7": news, opinions, blogs". The founder was a group of local public figures and entrepreneurs, including Leonid Zilberg and Alexander Ostrovsky.

Most of the founders are members of the local branch of the Memorial society, the materials of this society are often reprinted in 7x7.

Sofya Kropotkina was the editor-in-chief at the time the website was founded, later Elena Solovieva and Maxim Polyakov took her place. As of 2020, the editor-in-chief is Oleg Grigorenko.

The website began to expand to other regions and changed its name to “7x7. Horizontal Russia”, focusing on the regions of the North-West, the Volga region, the Centre and the Urals.

In 2011–2012, access to the website from government agencies was prohibited. In 2014, the Internet channel "7x7 TV" was launched on YouTube.

From September 2013 to September 2017, traffic increased from 61 thousand to 182 thousand unique visitors per month, the number of articles devoted to news about the Komi Republic decreased from 3–4 to 1-2 per day.

The website sued Natalia Mikhalchenkova, the Minister of Education of the Komi Republic, because of the publication about the presence of plagiarism in her candidate work, and won.

In 2020, the website wrote about the attempts of the authorities of the Komi Republic to hide the outbreak of the COVID-19 pandemic, as a result of which the head of the republic Sergey Gaplikov and the republican Minister of Health Dmitry Berezin were fired.

On 28 December 2020, the Ministry of Justice of Russia added 7x7 journalist Sergei Markelov to the so-called media register of “foreign agents” in connection with his cooperation with Sever.Realii, an affiliate of Radio Liberty, included in the media register of “foreign agents”. On 31 March 2021, the Zamoskvoretsky District Court of Moscow approved the decision of the Ministry of Justice; this court decision was the first to approve the addition of an individual to the register of media-“foreign agents”.

On 21 July 2023, Russia's Ministry of Justice added 7x7 to the so-called list of "foreign agents".

== Operations ==
The name of the website is a reference to the original homepage design, which had seven columns and seven rows. The main topics of publications are politics, human rights and ecology. In particular, the website publishes materials about corruption and torture in prisons and social materials (for example, a video about one day in the life of a disabled person). The authors of the website are generally critical of the Russian regional and federal authorities.

The website has a news section written by professional journalists and an opinion section written by community and civil activists. The website also has a blog platform with the ability to comment on materials, a YouTube channel, a “Live” section about events that do not need comments, a “Longreads” section, an English version and a mobile version of the website.

In Spain, a website with a similar name and logo publishes a daily newsletter covering world events in Spanish. The platform focuses on providing a concise overview of global affairs, offering readers key insights into international news. This Spanish version operates independently of the Russian '7x7,' catering specifically to Spanish-speaking audiences interested in timely world updates.

As of 2026, the website operates in 38 regions of Russia, including European regions without million-person cities as well as the North Caucasus and the South of Russia.

== Awards ==
In 2016, its "7x7-Karelia" branch was nominated for the "New Word" award from the Civil Initiatives Committee.

In 2019, 7x7 received the Free Press of Eastern Europe Award from the German ZEIT-Stiftung Foundation and the Norwegian Fritt Ord organization

In 2020, 7x7 journalists Ekaterina Malysheva and Evgeny Malyshev received a Multimedia + Podcasts award by the Open Russia Foundation for their coverage of the Network case.

As of December 2021, 7x7 journalists received the Redkollegia journalism award 6 times.

== See also ==
- Caucasian Knot
