= Help Needed =

Russian charitable organization

- Founded: 2012
- Founders: Mitya Aleshkovskiy, Anna Semyonova
- Type: charitable foundation
- Purpose: Development of infrastructure for charitable, social and socially significant initiatives
- Headquarters: Moscow, Russia
- Director: Elizaveta Vasina
- Budget: 2014 – ₽14795275; 2015 – ₽62668085; 2016 – ₽128437130; 2017 – ₽166246892 (Help Needed), ₽83265941 (Takie Dela)
- Staff: 60+
- Website: https://nuzhnapomosh.ru

Help Needed (Russian: Нужна Помощь, romanized: Nuzhna Pomoshch') is a charitable foundation that helps other charities and social projects in Russia. The mission of the foundation is the systematic development of charity in the country and changing the attitude of society towards solving social problems.

The foundation systematically implements projects aimed at the interaction and development of all parts of society related to solving social problems. The main goals are to strengthen the nonprofit sector in Russia, so that employees can maintain a high level of professionalism; to have the number of charities and non-governmental organizations (NGOs) be sufficient to address the needs of a vulnerable population; and finally, to actively involve all citizens in solving social problems.

The foundation works as a fund of funds, fundraising for other non-profit organizations, including charitable foundations. While it helps other organizations, it does not provide targeted assistance to beneficiaries. All projects supported by the foundation are verified.

Ministry of Justice of Russia 1 March 2024 included the fund in the list of foreign agents.

== History of the foundation ==
In 2012 TASS photojournalist Mitya Aleshkovsky came to Krymsk for an editorial assignment. After he led the development of a support system that efficiently helped local residents suffering from terrible flooding, he decided to leave photojournalism and devote himself entirely to charity. In 2013 Aleshkovskiy and a group of journalists started the charitable program HelpNeeded.ru, which operated under the Mosaic of Happiness charitable foundation.

Help Needed was registered as a charitable foundation on September 1, 2015. The co-founders were Aleshkovsky, who headed the foundation board, and Anna Semenova, who became the organization's director. Previously, Semenova worked for the Our Children foundation (2012–2014), Volunteers to help orphans (2007–2012), and for "Start" (2004–2007). She graduated from the Moscow State University Department of Sociology.

The board of the foundation is the supreme collegiate body with the key function to ensure that the foundation meets the objectives for which it was set up. Operations are overseen by the board of trustees. The duties of the Board and the board of trustees are determined by the statute of the foundation.

== Activities ==
=== Takie Dela ===
The Takie Dela web portal was launched on May 25, 2015. The project name comes from the Russian phrase takiye dela (Russian: такие дела, lit. 'so it goes'). The main goal of the project is to use high-quality journalism as a powerful tool for the systematic resolution of social problems in Russia. Mitya Aleshkovsky stated that the portal's "task is to return the ordinary person's story to journalism and, in general, to the media space", rediscover traditions of social journalism and create a new media approach. Every day the portal posts fundraising articles about the wards of charitable projects which it supports. At the end of such materials readers are encouraged to make a regular donation of any amount to help the particular project. To provide the full transparency, all fundraising results and budgets of supported projects which are verified by the Help Needed experts, as well as the foundation's own reports are published online and publicly available. In addition to fundraising articles, the portal publishes editorials. Andrei Loshak and Pavel Pryanikov were editors-in-chief in 2015–2016. Since 2016 the project has been led by Valery Panyushkin. The visual department is headed by Andrei Polikanov, who worked as a photo editor for Time magazine, headed the department of photography at the Russian Reporter magazine and served as a member of the photo contest jury for World Press Photo. Takie Dela has received various awards, including the Russian government's media prize in 2017 for "creating a new information portal format to support and develop charities in Russia", the Sakharov Prize, and others.

Over the years of its existence, “Takie Dela” has grown into a large independent media with an audience of millions and in 2023 it separated from the foundation.

=== Special Projects department ===
Takie Dela's special projects department is focused on the production of new forms of media covering "tough" and unpopular topics.

In March 2017 an animated web documentary titled "There once lived..." was released in honor of Homeless Day. The interactive online project tells five stories of real people and received several awards at the 2017 Great Eight festival (G8).

The special projects team also received the 2017 Best Digital News Story award of the international festival Visa pour l'Image for "Kosa i Kamen" (Russian: Коса и Камень, lit. 'Scythe and Stone'; titled "Warm Waters Kamchatka" in English). The project was created in collaboration with photographer Vlad Sokhin and is about climate change in the Russian Far East.

=== Polzuyas Sluchayem: Take this opportunity ===
In December 2016, Help Needed launched an online platform, Pol'zuyas' Sluchayem (Russian: Пользуясь Случаем, lit. 'Take this opportunity'), aimed at involving a broader audience in fundraising for charity projects. The service allows anyone to raise funds for non-profit projects using any occasion such as a birthday, anniversary, or sporting event. Users can create pages for their events and invite their friends, colleagues and subscribers to raise funds for the projects they support.

=== Research ===
Study of the non-profit sector in Russia is one of the key activities of the foundation. Researchers of the foundation systematically collect, analyze and evaluate data on the sector. All research materials are publicly available on the foundation website.

=== Charitable tours ===
At the end of 2017, Help Needed won the Russian presidential grant to implement the "Charity Tour" program in the eastern regions of the country. The program's goal is to develop Russian civil society through combining efforts of regional NGOs and media, local authorities and business stakeholders. At the local level the project's goal is to enhance the professional skills of regional NGOs.

=== Publishing house ===
In 2017, the foundation opened its own publishing house to print books on charity, philanthropy and various aspects of development of the non-profit sector of the economy. According to foundation Chairman Mitya Aleshkovskiy, it is a logical and very important step for the foundation to regularly publish books which are essential for everyone involved in solving social problems. The first book published was a Russian edition of Uncharitable – How Restraints on Nonprofits Undermine Their Potential by American writer, entrepreneur and activist Dan Pallotta.
