= Ivan Golunov =

Russian investigative journalist

- Иван Голунов
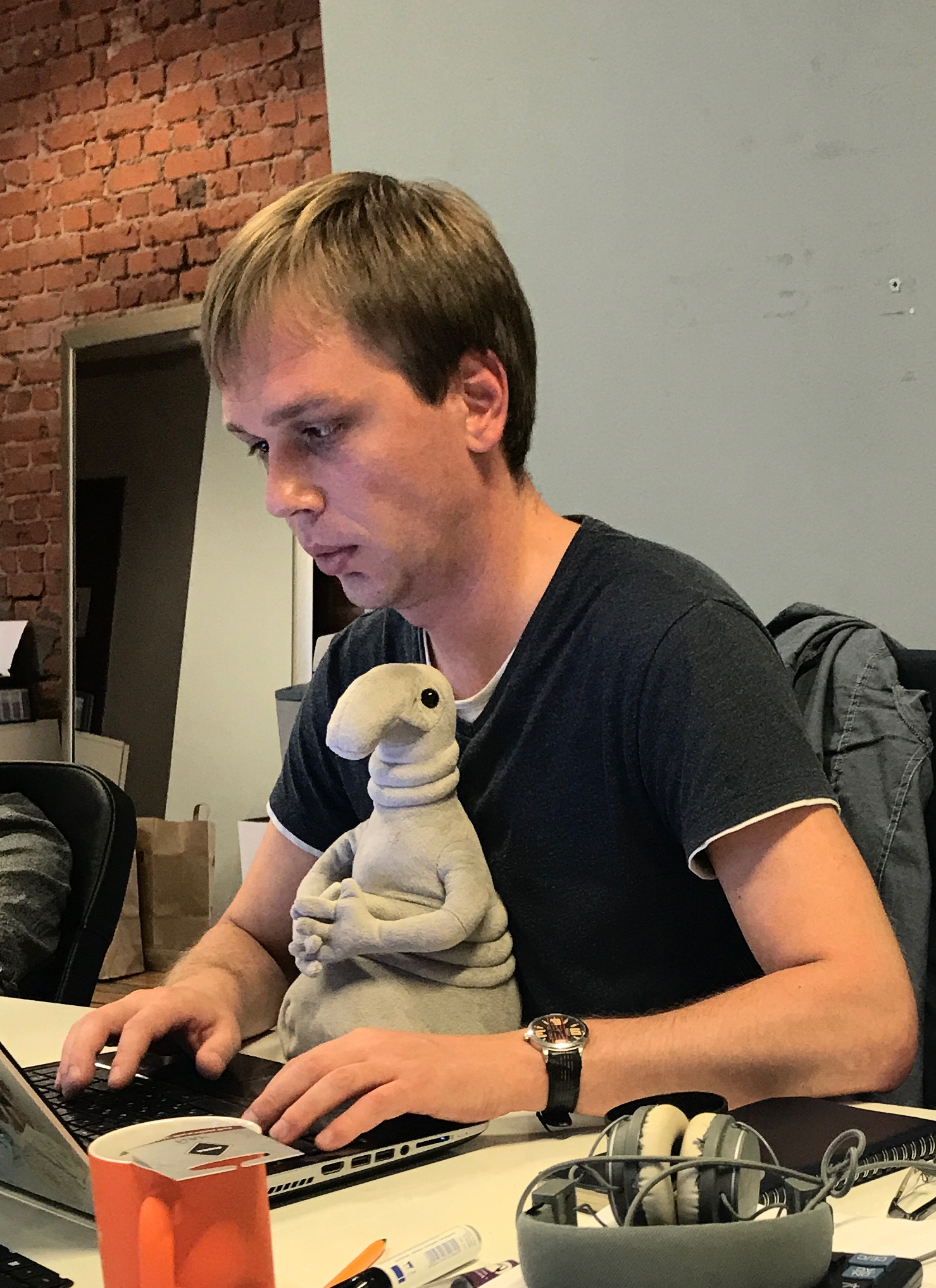
- Golunov in 2019
- Born: Ivan Valentinovich Golunov; 19 January 1983 (age 43); Moscow, Soviet Union
- Occupation: Investigative journalist

Ivan Valentinovich Golunov (Russian: Ива́н Валенти́нович Голуно́в; born 19 January 1983) is a Russian investigative journalist and anti-corruption reporter currently working for the independent outlet Meduza.

He came to public attention in June 2019 when he was arrested and charged with a drug-related crime by the Moscow city police; he was later released after widespread public outcry, which alleged that the case was fabricated to silence Golunov's investigations into corruption. (Note: The response spanned a very diverse range of figures whose union was unlikely to happen.) Golunov's arrest has attracted much attention from the Russian internet and social media community and has spurred criticism of abuse of power by the police.

== Early life and career ==
An ethnic Vepsian, Ivan Golunov was born on 19 January 1983 in Moscow. He studied at Moscow International Film School No. 1318, and completed an internship at Novaya Gazeta in the late 1990s. He then worked for the magazine Afisha, writing a guide to the suburbs, and then for Vedomosti between 2003 and 2005. He was then with Forbes for a time, before returning to Vedomosti in 2008. In 2009 he began working as a journalist for Slon, and in 2012 he joined the TV Rain channel. He began collaborating with RBK in 2014. Since 2016 he has been a special correspondent for the online media Meduza.

While working with Meduza, Golunov wrote a number of articles concerning corruption in Russian society. Among them were "The evictors", looking at loan sharks in Moscow, and "The penthouse family", an exposé of corruption in the Moscow mayoral office and the acquisition of a fortune in real estate. Other investigations included 'A roughly painted, cheap fake', about a controversial multi-billion rouble restoration of the Stone Flower Fountain, and 'Musicians remain silent and afraid', concerning the exchange of state assets and links to presidential agencies. His article "A coffin, a cemetery and hundreds of billions of rubles", published in 2017, investigated crime and corruption in the Russian funeral industry. He has twice received the Redkollegia Award for his work, firstly in October 2017, alongside fellow journalists Aleksandr Borzenko, Aleksandr Gorbachyov, and Daniil Turovsky for their article "The 'Christian state' does not exist. But behind it, perhaps, is the FSB"; and in August 2018 for his "A coffin, a cemetery and hundreds of billions of rubles". He was researching a followup to this latter study at the time of his arrest in 2019, looking at connections between funeral businesses in Moscow and the city's Federal Security Service (FSB) department, and had just submitted a draft of the article on the day of his arrest.

== Arrest and charges ==
=== Arrest ===
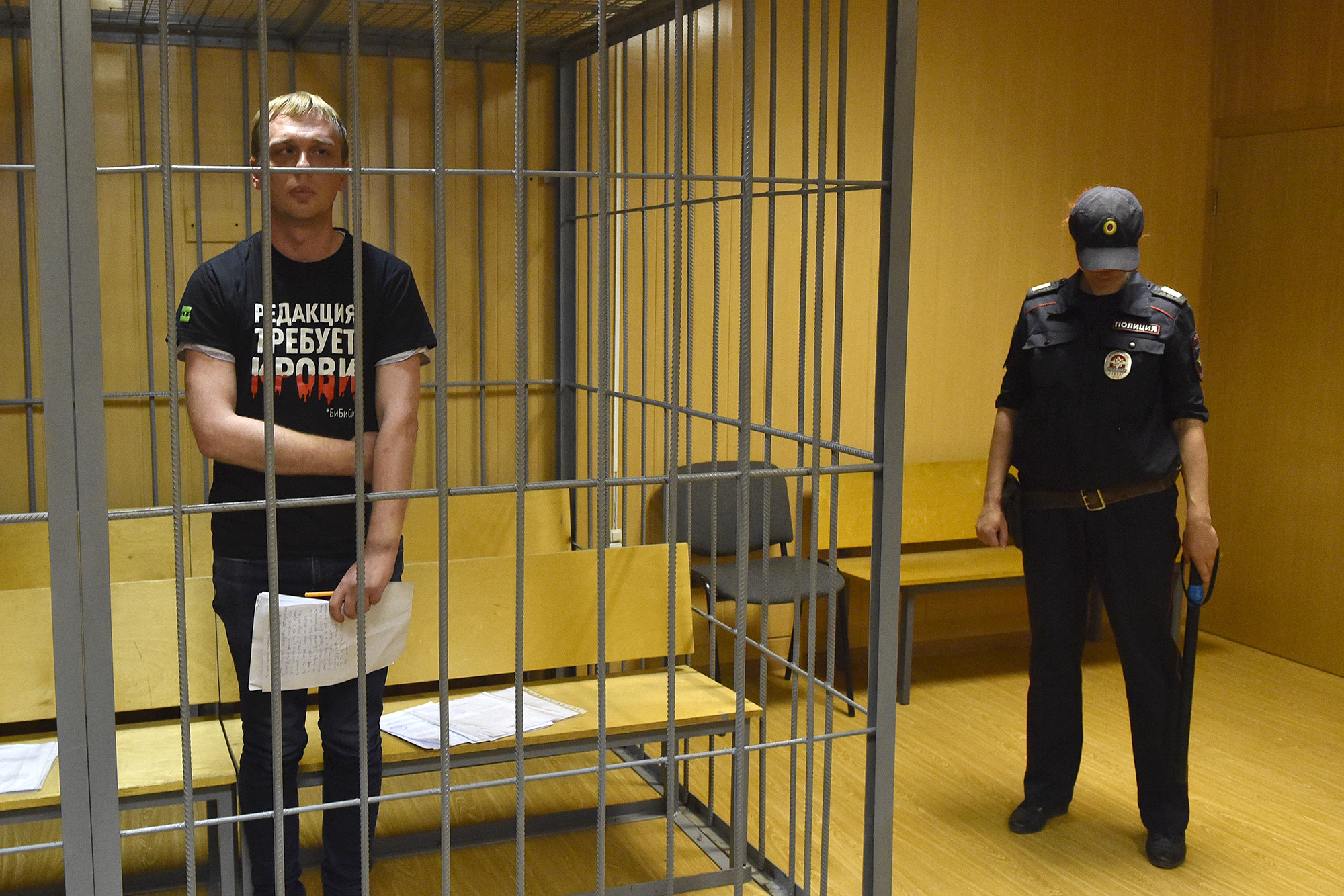
Golunov appearing at the Nikulinsky District Court on 8 June 2019

On 7 June 2019, Golunov was arrested by Moscow City Police on drug-related crime charges. Colleagues and friends of Golunov expressed their belief that the case was fabricated and charges were primarily motivated by Golunov's investigations into corruption. Those publicly speaking in defense of Golunov included Alexei Navalny, Vladimir Posner, Yuri Shevchuk, Zemfira, Alexey Venediktov, Victor Matizen, Victor Shenderovich, Anna Narinskaya, Ksenia Sobchak, Boris Grebenshchikov, Dmitry Muratov, Andrey Zvyagintsev, Leonid Parfyonov, Grigory Yavlinsky, Oxxxymiron, and a number of other journalists, artists, and public figures. Three major Russian newspapers, Kommersant, Vedomosti and RBK, published a joint editorial under the headline "I am / We are Ivan Golunov".

Several dozen of Golunov's works (in Russian) about corruption among officials and businessmen in Moscow and other cities and regions were made public at the time of his arrest, and offered for reprint and distribution in order to raise public awareness of the case. (Note: At the time they were available for free under Creative Commons License.)

In a press release about the arrest of Golunov and a search of his apartment, the police published a series of photos, eight of which showed a drug lab. These photographs were widely distributed through Telegram instant-messaging channels linked to the police. Soon the police officially confirmed that the photographs were taken in the apartment of the suspect. However, they then admitted that an error had occurred and only one photo was actually taken at Golunov's apartment.

On 8 June, Golunov was sentenced to house arrest until 7 August.

=== Release ===
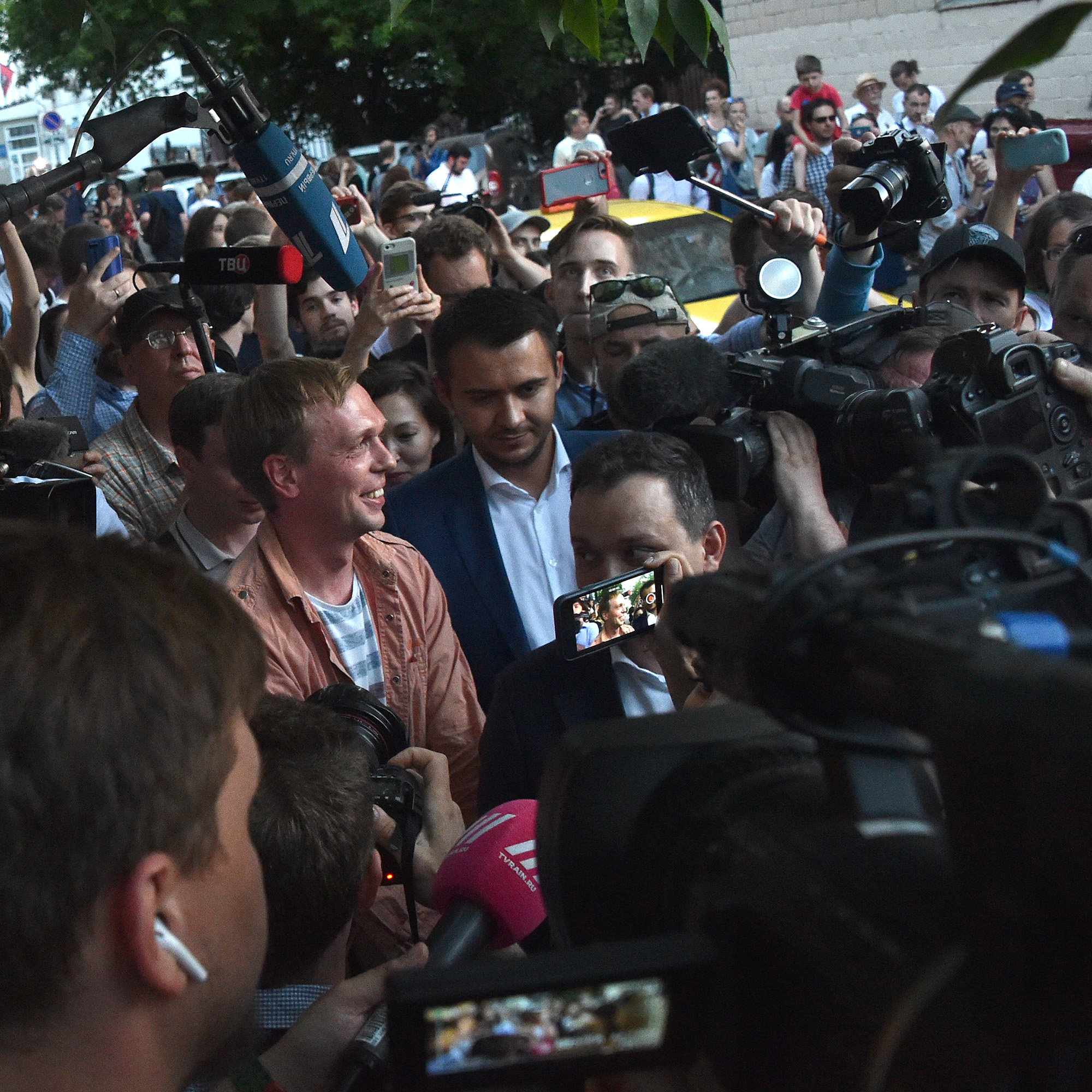
Golunov after leaving the building of the Main Investigation Department of the Chief Directorate of the Ministry of Internal Affairs in Moscow, 11 June 2019

On 11 June 2019, the non-profit Anti-Corruption Foundation published an investigation that linked alleged masterminds behind Golunov's persecution to officials in the Russian Federal Security Service (FSB), including its Moscow office chief. On the same day, Golunov was released and cleared of all charges. Almost simultaneously, Oyub Titiev, a Russian human-rights activist arrested in 2018, was released by another Russian court.

Notwithstanding Golunov's release, a planned but unauthorized rally was held in Moscow in support of him on 12 June. Protesters called to punish those involved in the fabrication of criminal cases. Officers in riot gear attacked protesters. Hundreds of people were detained, including political activist Alexei Navalny and a member of staff from the German magazine Der Spiegel, as well as many Russian journalists.

=== Subsequent investigation ===
About six months after Golunov's release, five ex-police officers were charged over fabrication of his case. On May 21, 2021 the five former officers were sentenced from 5 to 12 years in prison. Additionally the court ordered each of them to pay Golunov $13,600 (or 1 million rubles at the time). Meduza outlet where Golunov is working expressed skepticism over the officer's sentence: it believes that justice didn't reach those who have originally masterminded the crime.

In July 2023, Golunov said that the Ministry of Internal Affairs had paid him 1.5 million rubles in damages following a ruling by the Moscow City Court in December 2022.

== See also ==
- Media freedom in Russia
- Human rights in Russia
- ru:Дело Ивана Голунова, case of Ivan Golunov
