= IStories =

Independent Russian website

iStories
- Website type: Investigative journalism
- Available in: 2 languages
- List of languages Russian; English
- Country of origin: Russia
- Owner: Roman Anin
- Founders: Roman Anin; Olesya Shmagun
- Editor: Alesya Marokhovskaya
- Employees: 15 (as of 2021)
- Website: Official website
- Commercial: No
- Registration: None
- Launched: April 2020; 6 years ago
- Current status: Active

iStories or Important Stories (Russian: Важные истории, romanized: Vazhnyye Istorii) (Note: or Vazhnie Istorii) is an independent Russian website specialising in investigative journalism. The website was founded in 2020 by Russian journalists Roman Anin and Olesya Shmagun. IStories published a number of high-profile investigations. The office of the website is located in Latvia.

== History ==
IStories (the "I" stands for "important") was launched at the end of April 2020. Its founders are Russian journalists Roman Anin and Olesya Shmagun. Anin, Shmagun and several other journalists in their team had previously worked for Novaya Gazeta, a Russian newspaper. 4 out of 10 journalists at IStories were taking part in the investigation of the Panama Papers. IStories was created in response to the growing pressure from the Russian government on the media.

IStories published its first two investigations with the participation of Novaya Gazeta. It investigated the illegal supply of low quality ventilators and COVID-19 tests, the production of surgical masks during the COVID-19 pandemic in Russia, domestic violence in Russia, the Russian waste management market, Vladimir Putin's daughter Katerina Tikhonova and her husband Kirill Shamalov, persecution of the Russian politician Alexei Navalny, oil spill disasters in Russia and others topics. In November 2020, the Global Investigative Journalism Network wrote that IStories had 13 staff.

Journalists of IStories were also taking part in investigations of the FinCEN Files and the Pandora Papers.

In 2021, IStories had 15 staff. In February 2021, it published an article that talked about how Rosneft, a Russian oil company, bought part of the Pirelli company. After a complaint from Rosneft, the court ordered the website to remove the article. In March 2021, the media outlet published an investigation into the Russian Federal Security Service's (FSB) deputy director Sergey Korolev and his links to Russian criminals. In April 2021, the FSB raided IStories offices and the apartment of its editor-in-chief, Roman Anin. The raid was formally connected to a 2016 criminal case for violation of privacy. (Note: The case was opened in 2016, after Anin published an article about a $100 million yacht belonging to the then-wife of Igor Sechin, the CEO of Rosneft, a Russian state-controlled oil company) After the raid, Anin was taken to the Investigative Committee of Russia. In July 2021, the Russian activist Alexander Ionov demanded the Russian government to designate IStories as a "foreign agent". On 20 August 2021, the Ministry of Justice of the Russian Federation designated the legal entity of IStories, IStories fonds, and its journalists Anin, Shmagun, Alesya Marokhovskaya, Roman Shleynov (Роман Шлейнов), Irina Dolinina, Dmitry Velikovsky (Дмитрий Великовский) as "foreign agents". In 2021, IStories closed its operations in Russia.

In early March 2022, Roskomnadzor, a Russian government agency, blocked access to the websites of independent Russian media outlets Dozhd, Echo of Moscow and others for their coverage of the 2022 Russian invasion of Ukraine. On 3 March 2022, IStories published a letter, explaining how to bypass the blocking by the Russian authorities. On 5 March 2022, the Ministry of Justice of the Russian Federation designated IStories as an "undesirable organisation". This designation prohibits the activities of the organisation on the territory of Russia and prescribes sanctions for anyone who supports the organisation. On 11 March 2022, Roskomnadzor blocked access to the website for what it says are "falsehoods [on topics] of substantial public interest" about the 2022 Russian invasion of Ukraine.

In November 2023, IStories joined with the International Consortium of Investigative Journalists, Paper Trail Media and 69 media partners including Distributed Denial of Secrets and the Organized Crime and Corruption Reporting Project (OCCRP) and more than 270 journalists in 55 countries and territories to produce the 'Cyprus Confidential' report on the financial network which supports the regime of Vladimir Putin, mostly with connections to Cyprus, and showed Cyprus to have strong links with high-up figures in the Kremlin, some of whom have been sanctioned. Government officials including Cyprus president Nikos Christodoulides and European lawmakers began responding to the investigation's findings in less than 24 hours, calling for reforms and launching probes.

On 17 June 2024, a Moscow court issued arrest warrants for IStories editor-in-chief and award-winning investigative reporter Roman Anin and Ekaterina Fomina, a journalist at TV Rain and a former IStories correspondent, on charges of disseminating "false information" about Russia's armed forces in Ukraine. Russia's Interior Ministry added two Russian journalists in exile to its wanted list. In the spring of 2022, Fomina published an investigative report regarding war crimes in the Russian invasion of Ukraine. Fomina said the arrest warrant would affect her professional life as she would not be able to travel to many countries that could arrest her and extradite her to Russia. IStories wrote in response that "The Russian authorities call ‘fake’ any information that does not fit in with their propaganda campaign or does not correspond to the official position of the Kremlin."

== Organisation ==
IStories is a non-profit organisation. It is operated by a board of directors. The organisation modelled on ProPublica, a non-profit investigative journalism organisation. As of March 2022, most of IStories' journalists are based outside of Russia.

The outlet focuses on collaboration with international and regional media. According to Anin, the website's goal is to "tell you about the real heroes who have changed the world around us for the better - whether it be a village, district or city - in spite of corruption and the arbitrariness of the state." In addition to investigations, IStories produces text and video tutorials for journalists.
