= CNews (disambiguation) =

CNews is a French television channel.

CNews may also refer to:

- CNews (newspaper), a French newspaper
- CNews (magazine), a Russian technology magazine
