= The Road (Auktyon song) =

1993 song by Auktyon from the album Ptitsa

"The Road (Doroga)"

Song by Auktyon

from the album Ptitsa
- Language: Russian
- Released: 1993
- Recorded: 1993
- Genre: Jazz rock; Folk rock; Indie rock
- Length: 3:31
- Label: Dyadyushka Records
- Composer: Leonid Fyodorov
- Lyricist: Dmitry Ozersky
- Producers: Auktyon and Christoph Carsten

The Road (Doroga) (Russian: Дорога) is a song by the Russian rock band Auktyon from their sixth studio album, Ptitsa (the Bird), released in 1993. The song was composed by Leonid Fyodorov and written by Dmitry Ozersky in the same year. In 2004, the encyclopedia Estrada Rossii. 20 vek (Russian Pop Music. 20th Century), edited by Doctor of Arts Elizaveta Uvarova, described the album Ptitsa and highlighted Doroga as a hit. The encyclopedia used the song's lyrics to illustrate how the album encapsulated "nearly a decade of struggle for self-determination, marking the journey of the whole generation of disillusioned romantics and revolutionaries who burned their bridges and embarked on a long and joyless road".

In 1995, Doroga became the first Auktyon song in years to be featured in a music video. The video starred the band's frontman, Oleg Garkusha, and was directed by Sergey Zezyulkov. In 2000, the song was included in the soundtrack of the cult Russian crime film Brother 2, directed by Aleksei Balabanov and starring Sergei Bodrov Jr.

The newspaper RBK Daily noted that, despite being written during the "turbulent times" between 1991 and 1993, the song gained renewed relevance through its inclusion in Brother 2. An anonymous author from the newspaper remarked that it "found a new generation" and "retained its meaning and edge", remaining "entirely modern and timely" even in 2013. Russian journalist and producer Anton Chernin described Doroga as the most famous song from the album. The song has also been referenced multiple times in studies of Russian rock poetry by Doctor of Philology, Yury Domansky.

== Content of the song ==
Writer and former left-nationalist political figure Andrey Aktsynov in his novel The Duelist (2016) describes the meaning of the song Doroga as follows: "A person is lonely and abandoned in this world full of ghosts and illusions, and they themselves are just such a ghost. Therefore, it is foolish to cling to anything here. It is better to fly, as if in a dream, marveling and enchanted, in search of new passions and adventures". However, the song's composer, Leonid Fyodorov, commented on the lyrics of Auktyon's songs, stating: "There is no verbal meaning in any of our songs. The meaning lies in a certain state created by these songs".

Among the artistic imagery in the song's lyrics, notable elements include "foolish foreign cities" where the lyrical hero was loved, though it was not truly them; a long "joyless" road "flying into the skies as dust"; the heavy earth holding them by the legs; and a "hopeless" zone "tensely" awaiting them. The phrase "I am my own sky and moon" appears three times in the lyrics. It is followed twice by "A naked, content moon", but the final iteration changes to "I am flying somewhere, but it is not me".

== History of the song's creation and initial recording ==
=== The band on the eve of the song's creation ===
In the early 1990s, the band Auktyon developed the image of the "little man" in their work, portraying a figure "born under a dome and living in the confined spaces of a totalitarian society, as well as their own fears and delusions". The heroes of their albums during this period were often "mute, foolish, unlucky outcasts, Ivan who doesn't remember his kin, walking a razor's edge between life and death while laughing at themselves and the world around them". These characters existed outside societal systems, living by "breaking through the bars of their cage, tearing their skin, bleeding, and soaring like birds into the free sky". The band was actively engaged in both studio and live performances, frequently touring beyond the borders of the Russian Federation. According to the 2004 encyclopedia Estrada Rossii. 20 vek (Russian Pop Music. 20th Century), Auktyon achieved significant success on tours in France, Germany, Denmark, Switzerland, Austria, the Netherlands, and the Czech Republic. In Paris, the musicians met and began collaborating with poet, artist, and bard Aleksei Khvostenko. Within the band, changes were also occurring: showman Vladimir Vesyolkin left, and collaboration with artist Kirill Miller ceased.

Russian journalist and rock historian Mikhail Margolis noted the contradictory position of Auktyon in the Russian pop scene. A symbol of the band's financial success was their purchase of a used Mercedes bus for 20,000 German marks at a "Turkish flea market" in Germany. However, the bus was driven not by a professional driver—due to lack of funds—but by bass guitarist Viktor Bondarik. The bus became a home on wheels for the musicians and served them for ten years. While Auktyon performed series of 10–15 concerts in European countries, in Russia, as saxophonist Nikolai Rubanov put it, "things were a complete mess, with performances happening once every six months".

=== Semantics of the word road in Russian rock poetry ===
This theme was explored in a scholarly article by Nadezhda Nezhdanova, Candidate of Philology, and associate professor at the Department of Literature and Folklore at Kurgan State University. She noted that the "idea of movement without a defined destination constitutes an archetypal concept in Russian consciousness", and its essence lies in "the notion of the intrinsic value of movement, not the destination". The semantics of the word "road" in Russian rock poetry represents an antinomy to "rest, stagnation, sleep, and desolation." It embodies "the free movement of the subject in time and space, the unpredictability of transitions and associations", and serves as a recurring motif in rock poetry. The road often takes on the meaning of confession and is interpreted as a metaphysical path.

Candidate of Philology and associate professor at the Department of Russian Language and Literature at Amur State University of Humanities and Pedagogy, Ivan Avdeenko, in the Road chapter of his monograph Spatial Symbols of Russian Rock Poetry (2014), attempted to define the semantic content of the road symbol in Russian rock poetry. According to him, it represents the earthly journey of the human soul, combining the "spiritual and material worlds". On this path, a person experiences torments as the physical difficulties that reflect the complexity of life. Avdeenko emphasized the importance of spirituality in relation to the road in rock poetry, a quality absent in Russian chanson. In his monograph, he clarified the meaning of "road" in rock poetry: the path is iterative, "from one step or action to the next". Avdeenko wrote: "The road is largely abstract, visible but intangible, and contradictory in its essence: it offers opportunities yet restricts, controls, and confines. Nevertheless, a person is drawn to the roadas the very movement of life, even without the ability to identify the road as their own".

In a later article, Content analysis of rock poetry texts in describing the symbols path and road (2021), Avdeenko contrasted these two symbols. He noted their similarities in cross-association and shared contextual meanings, including "their extension relative to the starting point, the stepwise and staged nature of movement, and the combination of possibilities and limitations". However, the differences between the two symbols in rock poetry typically relate to opposing attitudes toward various worldview categories. Concepts such as "certainty, controllability, repeatability, standardization, and practicality" are characteristic of the "road" symbol, while "uncertainty, independence, uniqueness, alternativeness, and spirituality" are associated with the "path" symbol.

=== Song's creation ===
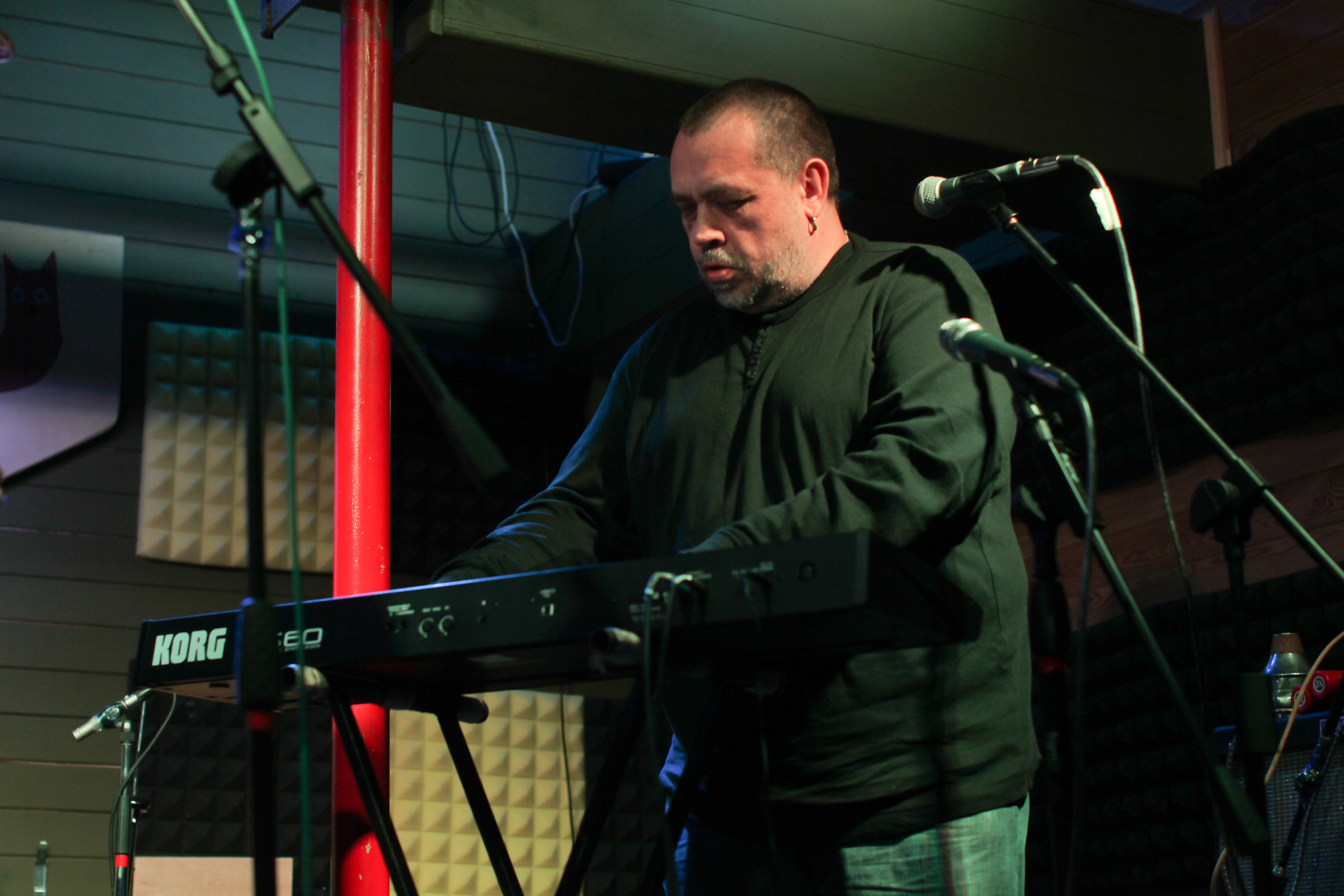
Dmitry Ozersky in 2016

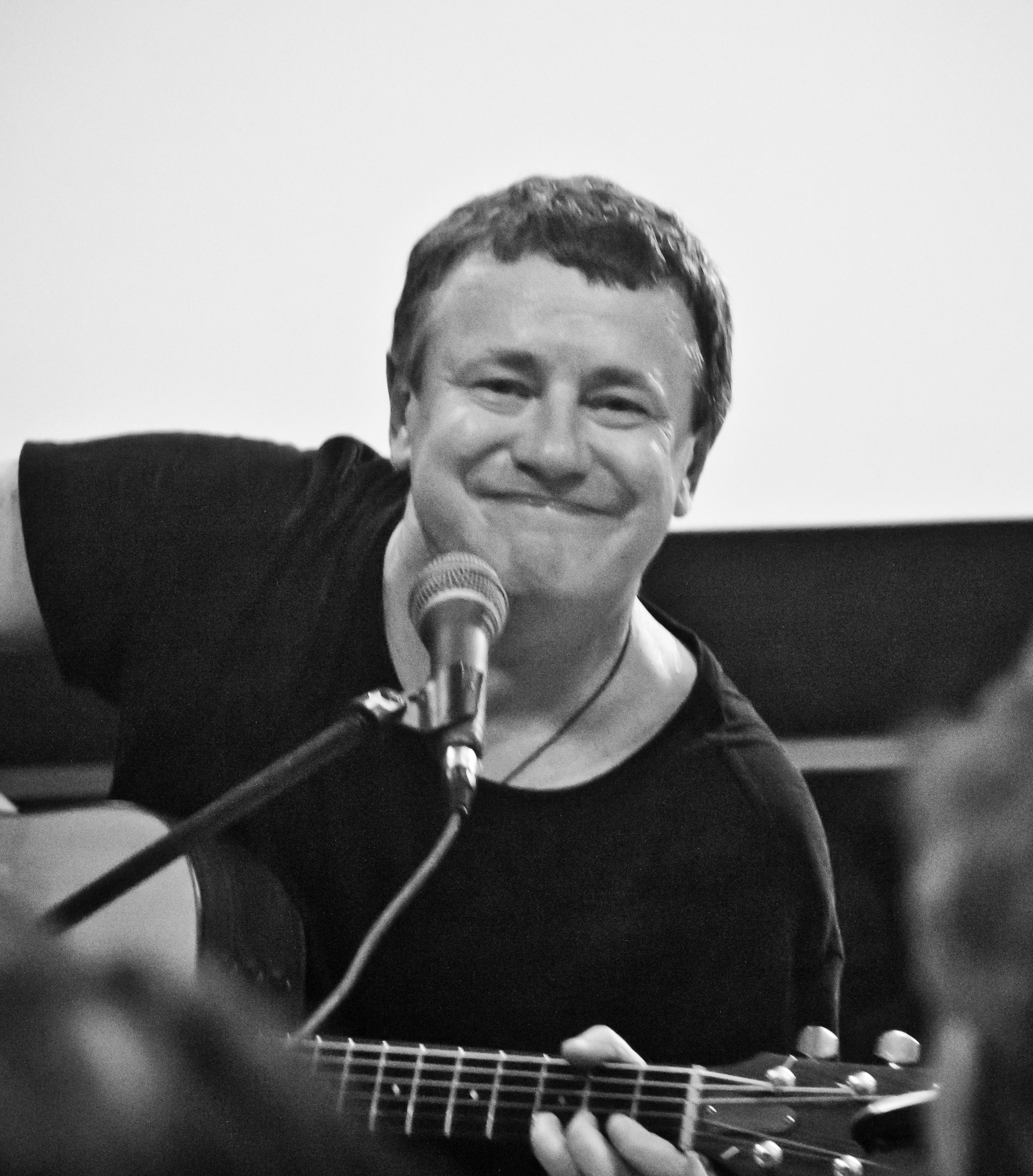
Leonid Fyodorov in 2017

The primary work on creating the song Doroga took place during Auktyon's tour in Germany. (Note: Anton Chernin clarified tha after the album was recorded, Fyodorov translated the song in Hamburg and re-recorded the vocals there.) The song's composer, Leonid Fyodorov, recounted that it was a pleasant summer, the musicians stayed in Hamburg for a week, housed in private apartments, as they were invited to tour by a Danish taxi company run by former hippies. The band members lived separately, with Fyodorov staying with drummer Boris Shaveynikov and keyboardist and lyricist Dmitry Ozersky at the apartment of two women. With few concerts scheduled, the musicians had ample free time. Fyodorov recalled stepping out for a walk or shopping, describing the area as a "jouful, commuter neighborhood with bars and stuff like that". Upon returning, he told Ozersky about a new melody that had come to him. In two hours, Fyodorov and Ozersky drafted the song's lyrical framework, finalizing it two months later upon returning home. In this interview, Fyodorov described the songwriting process as quick, dating it to 1992 or 1993. Former Auktyon member Evgeny Dyatlov, who continued to follow the band's projects after leaving, recalled visiting Fyodorov in Saint Petersburg in 1993 when Fyodorov was "sitting in the kitchen composing Doroga". Fyodorov played the melody for Dyatlov, who later remarked that he knew immediately it would be a hit.

Fyodorov provided a different account of the song's creation in a March 1995 interview with Rock-Fuzz. He stated that during the year-long work on the album Ptitsa, the band members frequently argued, pushing the group to the brink of dissolution, and were dissatisfied with both themselves and their creative output. Fyodorov described Doroga as the only song from the album that required additional mixing in France, an event the interviewing journalist dated to late spring 1994.

=== Recordings ===
External audio
- Song "Doroga" from the album Ptitsa (1993) on YouTube

The song Doroga (with a duration of 3:43 due to the guitar intro) was included in the 1993 album Ptitsa, released in Germany. The album featured 11 tracks and was released by the record label Dyadyushka Records (Note: Rock music historian Andrey Burlaka wrote in the first volume of Rock Encyclopedia. Popular Music in Leningrad that this label was created by Auktyon and their German manager Christoph Carsten.) in vinyl format. Doroga appears on the album's Good Side (Dobraya Storona), with the second half of the songs recorded on the Evil Side (Zlaya Storona). The album was recorded at SNC Studio in Moscow (sound engineer: Sergey Dolgov, with assistance from Alexander Martisov and Mikhail Rappoport). Doroga was mixed at Altona Ton Studio in Hamburg. The song also appeared in the Ptitsa album released on audio cassette (11 tracks, Euro Records label, catalog no. 141, unofficial release, duration 3:17). It was included in the Ptitsa album released on CD in 1994 by TAU Produkt (11 tracks, TAU 00067, duration 3:30). By July 2023, Discogs listed 17 editions of the album by various labels (Euro Style, Manchester Files, Moroz Records, Misteriya Zvuka, Geometriya, Mirumir, and Western Thunder Records), all including Doroga.

In 1993, Dyadyushka Records also released two shortened versions of the Ptitsa album, containing only four songs, including Doroga (duration 3:31), but excluding the title track Ptitsa. The shortened album included It's not too late (Eshche ne pozdno), My love (Moya lyubov), and All spins around (Vsyo vertitsya).

In 2001, Auktyon, in collaboration with Misteriya Zvuka, released three editions of the album Doroga (MZ-041-4, MZ-041-2, MZ-041-9), where the song was the closing track. The song Doroga also appears in other Auktyon albums, including the self-titled album Auktyon, where it is the penultimate track (SNC Records, released on CD in 1995, SNC5053).

When asked why the Ptitsa CD exists in two different designs, Leonid Fyodorov explained to Dmitry Ivanishin that it was due to financial constraints: the initial Russian release had poor artwork by Kirill Kuvyrdin. "The second disc we released ourselves with our own design in Germany. It has a slightly different master, and one song —Doroga— was re-sung and re-mixed", Fyodorov stated.

The recording of the song included in the album featured:

- Leonid Fyodorov – vocals, electric guitar, acoustic guitar, song composer;
- Dmitry Matkovsky – electric guitar, acoustic guitar, sitar, Hawaiian guitar;
- Viktor Bondarik – bass;
- Dmitry Ozersky – keyboards, percussion, lyricist;
- Nikolai Rubanov – baritone saxophone, soprano saxophone, bass clarinet;
- Boris Shaveynikov – drums, xylophone, conga;
- Pavel Litvinov – percussion;
- Korney Morozov – violin;
- Terenty Dubrovin – cello.

Due to excessive alcohol consumption, the contribution of lyricist and frontman Oleg Garkusha to the Ptitsa album was minimal. Garkusha himself admitted to being barely present during the recording.

== Music video production ==
External videos
- Sergey Zezyulkov. Music video for the song "Doroga" by the band Auktyon (1995)

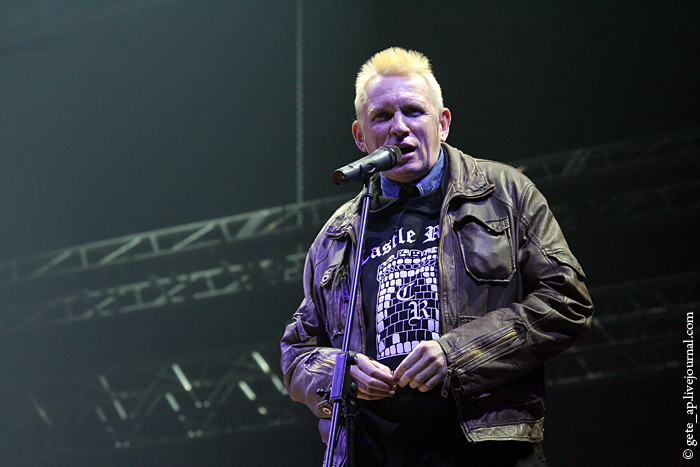
Oleg Garkusha in 2008

Doroga was the first song by Auktyon in many years that served as the basis for a music video. The main figure in the video was Oleg Garkusha. When he was preparing to leave for his dacha, the band's manager informed him that he needed to participate in a music video shoot. Garkusha stated that he was leaving and that "if people want, they can come" to their dacha. Soon, a small film crew arrived from Moscow to Garkusha's dacha, led by young director Sergey Zezyulkov, who, according to Garkusha, was completing his studies at VGIK at the time. The video was intended to be his diploma project (later, according to the musician, it received an excellent grade). At the dacha, Garkusha showed Zezyulkov locations that could be filmed for the video. Later, the band's frontman regretted that most of these locations (a dump, a city landfill, "a flock of seagulls," "completely picturesque places") were not included in the final version of the video. During filming, Oleg Garkusha had to ride a bicycle "on a fairly serious and busy intersection, where cars were moving back and forth, and two of the director's assistants stood at opposite ends of the road, signaling to drivers to proceed as cautiously as possible." During one take, the musician fell off the bicycle. The director and crew members rushed to help him, forgetting about the filming. Garkusha later expressed regret about this, stating that "it would have been interesting to fall right into the mud in that colorful costume, that jacket, with blood… It would have been interesting".

Later, when the video was released in film distribution, Garkusha was surprised to see "American bridges, skyscrapers, some magazines…" in it. From the musician's perspective, this video "echoed" in the film Brother 2, as the song Doroga plays when the older brother of the main character flies to the United States.

== Critics and evaluations ==
=== In academic circle ===
Elena Savitskaya, Candidate of Art History and Senior Researcher at the Sector of Artistic Issues of Mass Media at the State Institute of Art Studies, in an article about the band Auktyon in the publication Russian Estrada. 20th Century. Encyclopedia (2004), characterizes the album Ptitsa and calls the song Doroga a hit. She quotes its lyrics to illustrate the claim that this song encapsulates the band's nearly decade-long struggle for self-determination, which led a generation of disillusioned romantics and revolutionaries to "burn their bridges and embark on a long, joyless road". She notes the prevailing "mood of hopelessness, oblivion, and 'final countdown'... [which] reaches its apogee in this album".

Yuri Domansky, Doctor of Philological Sciences and Professor at the Department of Theoretical and Historical Poetics at the Institute of Philology and History of the Russian State University for the Humanities, wrote about the song in his monograph Rock Poetry: A Philological Perspective (2015): "the enigmatic and famous Doroga". In the book's conclusion, the researcher reviews concerts by Russian rock bands and his impressions of them, dedicating significant attention to Doroga. The song was performed as an encore at the end of a concert by Auktyon mentioned by Domansky. He recalled that the audience "suddenly rejoiced, as if realizing: this is it, the pinnacle, the climax, the catharsis. A real apogee of drive". He considers Doroga the best song not only by Auktyon. In another section of the monograph, Domansky mentioned the "stunning performance of the great Doroga during the vintage —dating back to the deep nineties— Mike's birthday celebration".

Philologist E. A. Egorov, in the article Features of the Functioning of 'Conditional' Images in Rock Poetry (2000), argues that although rock poetry is characterized by "an emphasis on the utmost degree of sincerity," it does not follow that it is dominated by so-called "real" images. Paradoxically, there is often an "accumulation of 'conditional,' ornamental images that have little in common with the reality in which the author exists". To illustrate this, Egorov cites the opening lines of Doroga. He notes that "unreal" images are most often associated, as in Auktyon's song, with first-person narration—through hyperbolization of auxiliary images, the highest degree of sincerity is achieved".

=== Auktyon musicians about the song ===
Mikhail Margolis wrote that, according to Leonid Fyodorov, only the songs Doroga (The Road), Moya lyubov (My love), and Den rozhdeniya (Birthday) truly stood out in the album Ptitsa. Fyodorov stated: "Doroga or Sedmoy (The Seventh) were quickly dropped from [live] performances, and we have no plans to bring them back. Although the songs are actually excellent, playing them live isn't interesting. They weren't made for concerts". In a 2000 interview with a correspondent from Muzykalnaya Gazeta, when asked about his reaction to the use of Doroga in the film Brother 2, Fyodorov responded: "Honestly, I don't care anymore. Really. It neither excites nor bothers me. I'm indifferent... They included it, so be it". He also noted that "the song was written for a different reason. Besides, it was quite a long time ago, and I'm indifferent to it now".

In a 2019 interview with the Estonian national broadcaster ERR, Oleg Garkusha, discussing the circumstances of the song's inclusion in Brother 2, stated: "Doroga — it's not pop music, but it's like a schlager".

=== In journalism and mass media ===
External videos
- Various performances of the song
- Song "Doroga" performed live with brass instruments
- Acoustic version of the song "Doroga" performed solo by Leonid Fyodorov (guitar and saxophone). Kvartirnik: Auktyon and Alexey Khvostenko
- Performance of the song by Auktyon at the Krylya festival in Tushino on June 17, 2000

Russian journalist, music critic, producer, and television and radio host Mikhail Kozarev, discussing the specifics of Auktyon's work and the reaction of Russian listeners in the first volume of the three-volume work My Rock-n-Roll (2007), wrote: "Even Doroga, which gained a second life in Brother 2, was always on the verge of dropping out in music tests [referring to regularly compiled music ratings] (those that measure whether the audience 'likes or dislikes' what is played on air). It barely scored a C". The co-authors of the encyclopedia Who's Who in Russian Rock Music (2006), discussing Leonid Fyodorov's shift toward jazz and folk and the reaction of his fans to this change in creative style, cited an example from a concert in the 2000s where the audience was openly bored by new compositions but was thrilled when older Auktyon hits from the 1990s, including Doroga, were performed.

In 2003, the lyrics of Doroga were included in the publication Russian Rock. An Anthology Experience. The daily business newspaper RBK Daily, in an article dedicated to the 20th anniversary of the album Ptitsa, noted that although Doroga was written, as the anonymous author put it, in turbulent times —between 1991 (the August Coup) and 1993 (the shooting of the White House)—thanks to its inclusion in Brother 2, it managed to "reach a new generation," "retaining both its meaning and its edge," and even in 2013 was perceived by listeners as "entirely modern and relevant".

Russian journalist and producer Anton Chernin called Doroga the most famous song on the album Ptitsa.. In 2019, Nashe Radio compiled and published a list of "The Best Russian Rock Songs" under the rubric "The Most Popular and Listened-to Songs by OUR Musicians!" Doroga was included in this list.

In June 2015, the editor-in-chief of the magazine Russky Reporter Vitaly Leibin and journalist Darya Blagoeva presented the results of a study on the most popular classical and poetic lines in Russian society, without distinguishing between classical literature and contemporary popular songs. According to the study's authors, songs and poems most quickly become part of our thinking and communication. At number 87 on the list are the lines "I am my own sky and moon, a naked, contented moon" from Dmitry Ozersky's lyrics for Auktyon's Doroga. According to the authors' classification, these are attributed to "'unofficial' Soviet (!) poetry and music," despite a separate category for "contemporary poetry and music".

The Russian socio-political internet publication Gazeta.Ru included Doroga in the list of "Most Popular Songs of 1993," published in 2022. The article's author specifically noted that the song became a hit "against the expectations" of the band's leader, Leonid Fyodorov.

The Russian news agency National News Service, reporting that Auktyon refused to compose music for the filming of Brother 3, wrote: "The soundtrack of the cult blockbuster Brother 2, Doroga, performed by Auktyon, was unofficially recognized as one of the main events of the year for Russian music lovers... For many of them, 'Doroga' was the first Auktyon song they heard. The entertainment online publication TV Mag interviewed young participants of the 2022 "New Song of the Year" concert, which, according to the publication, featured "the most fashionable and relevant" Russian artists, about the songs that made the strongest impression on them. One participant stated that Doroga was their "favorite old-school song".

== In culture ==
External videos
- Song "Doroga" in the film Brother 2

According to Yuri Domansky, the use of the song Doroga by Russian director Aleksei Balabanov in the film Brother 2 during the scene of the departure from Sheremetyevo airport to the United States of the character played by Viktor Sukhorukov "significantly refines and even deepens the character of the older brother" Domansky admitted that even his elderly mother was willing to watch the film specifically for the airport scene accompanied by Doroga.

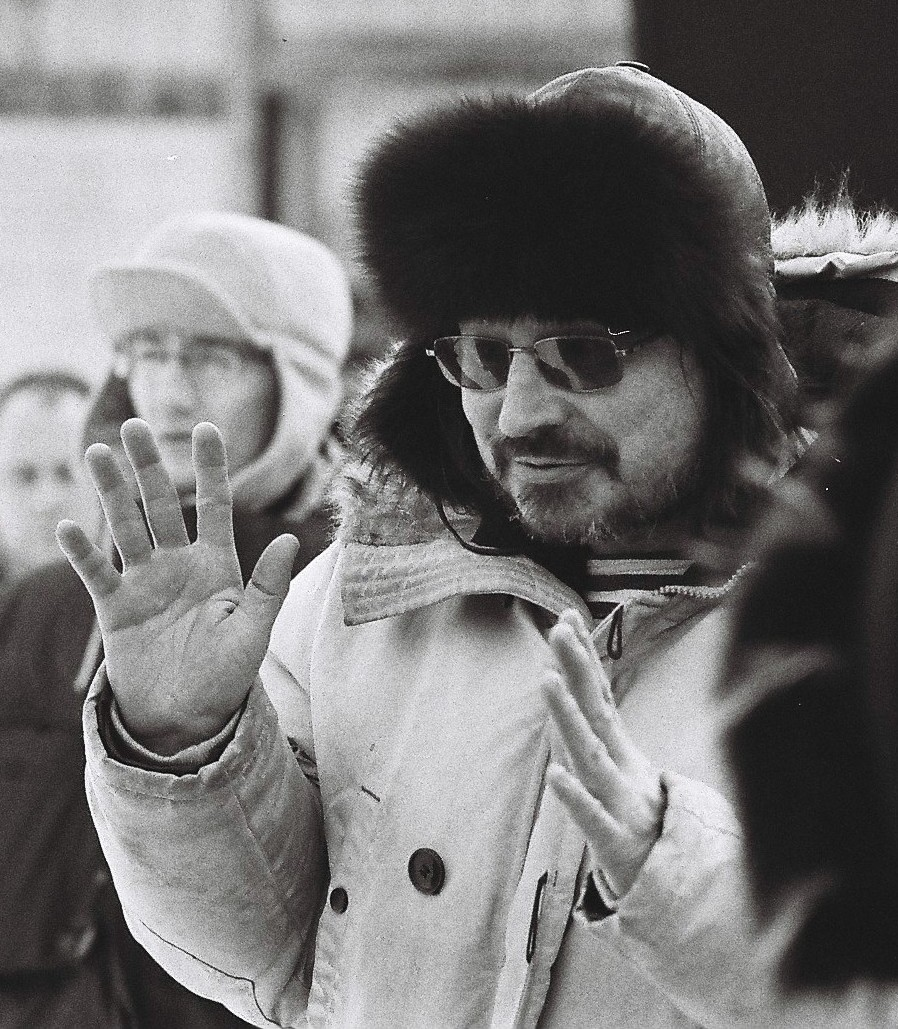
Aleksei Balabanov in 2008

Candidate of Cultural studies Daria Zhurkova in the article Director's Ear: Music in Balabanov's Films (2018) analyzes the airport scene where the older brother of the protagonist undergoes customs inspection to the music of Doroga. According to Zhurkova, the lyrics of the song's chorus symbolize the character's spiritual liberation. The customs inspection and the customs officers themselves are attributes of authority. Their presence in the frame aligns with the lyric "O-o-o, zona!" In the cultural scholar's view, "zona" refers to Russia, which the character is leaving. "The high, almost falsetto timbre of the vocalist, the constant 'hovering' of the melody on high notes with subsequent 'sliding' downward—all this creates an effect of jurodstvo," Zhurkova asserts. The tense scene in the film, thanks to the music, is infused with irony—according to Zhurkova, "action modulates into farce": Balabanov "plays with patriotic sentiments and the image of Russia, hinting at its closed, 'regime-like' character".

Mikhail Margolis wrote that in the 2000s, Auktyon's popularity reached heights after the release of Aleksei Balabanov's film Brother 2, which featured Doroga from the album Ptitsa. The film's soundtrack was released as a separate disc, with sales comparable to the most successful solo albums by popular bands of that time. As a result, the line "I am my own sky and moon…," which had been sung in chorus by fans at every Auktyon concert for seven years, was now picked up by "almost the entire country". Margolis claimed that the inclusion of Doroga in the film turned an entire generation into Auktyon fans. Later, the melody of "Doroga" began to be used as a ringtone for mobile phones. It was often said: "Honestly, I haven’t heard anything from Auktyon’s repertoire except Doroga, though the band seems pretty interesting. And even that song, I only heard because of Brother 2". Oleg Garkusha stated: "Doroga became for us something like what Autumn is for Yuri Shevchuk".

The use of the song in the film's soundtrack brought no financial benefits to its creators. According to Oleg Garkusha, Aleksei Balabanov asked Fyodorov for permission to use the song for about a year, saying he was making a "non-commercial film that wouldn’t generate profit". Dmitry Ozersky claimed that negotiations about the song were conducted not by Balabanov himself but by "someone from the administrative team of Brother 2" when the band was in Moscow for a tour. By 2010, the band's concerts remained popular, but, in Margolis's words, "hardly anyone in the audience still shouts Doroga!"

In Andrei Aktsynov's novel The Duelist, Doroga is the favorite song of the protagonist. He engages in drinking, drug use, hooliganism, and debauchery. The protagonist not only avoids work but despises those who do. Yet he dreams of active political involvement, serving as a "lackey for the leader of the National Bolsheviks, Eduard Limonov". In one episode, the protagonist recounts how he first heard Doroga. At six years old, returning from school with his father, he saw street musicians playing in a garden near the Gorkovskaya metro station. The rock band had two vocalists—a short one with a black mop of hair, wearing a stretched, torn green T-shirt, and a tall frontman resembling a circus clown, dressed in a black jacket adorned with medals and brooches, dancing in a muddy puddle, with splashes flying in all directions. The boy was enchanted by the song, cried from happiness for the first time, and stayed with his father to listen to the concert until the end.

In the article Rock Theater Today: On the Problem of Identification and Description (2019), Yuri Domansky discusses the play About You at the Moscow theater of deaf actors Nedoslovo (2017, directed by Anna Bashenkova). Rock songs played in their original soundtrack are accompanied in the performance by theatrical dance—a choreographic interpretation of the composition, "thanks to which new meanings are actualized or possibly formed in the songs; the verbal component is performed in sign language". Among the 14 songs used in the play is Doroga. The visual effect is enhanced by the costume color scheme: the actors, both male and female, wear predominantly black and white clothing, with bright red used sparingly, standing out against this backdrop. This color palette supports the overall concept of presenting the theme of "torments of soul and body".

== Bibliography ==
=== Sources ===
- Sverdlov, I. (1995). Делать рок-н-ролл слишком просто. Интервью с Леонидом Фёдоровым [Making rock'n'roll is too easy. Interview with Leonid Fedorov] (in Russian). Rock-Fuzz: Журнал. p. 6.
- Fyodorov, L. V. (2000). Зимы не будет? Интервью с Леонидом Фёдоровым [Will there be no winter? Interview with Leonid Fyodorov] (in Russian). Музыкальная газета: Газета.

=== Researches and non-fiction ===
- Adveenko, I. A. (2014). Дорога // Пространственные символы русской рок-поэзии. Монография [Doroga // Spatial symbols of Russian rock poetry. Monograph] (in Russian). Комсомольск-на-Амуре: Издательство Амурского гуманитарно-педагогического государственного университета. pp. 102–110. ISBN 978-5-8509-4556-5.
- Adveenko, I. A. (2021). Контент-анализ текстов рок-поэзии при описании символов ПУТЬ и ДОРОГА [Content analysis of rock poetry lyrics in describing the symbols PATH and ROAD] (in Russian). Научный диалог: Журнал. — Центр научных и образовательных проектов, 2021. pp. 9–25. ISSN 2225-756X.
- Domansky, Yu. V. (2015). Рок-маргиналии: обложка альбома, автометапаратекст, кино / «Мой рок-альбом» // Рок-поэзия: филологический ракурс [Rock marginalia: album cover, autometaparatext, cinema / “My rock album” // Rock poetry: a philological perspective] (in Russian). М.: Intrada. pp. 114–138 / 139–172. ISBN 978-5-8125-2133-2.
- Domansky, Yu. V. (2013). Рок-поэзия: перспективы изучения // Русская рок-поэзия: текст и контекст [Rock Poetry: Prospects of Study // Russian Rock Poetry: Text and Context] (PDF) (in Russian). Vol. 14. Кафедра теории литературы Тверского государственного университета. pp. 7–36. ISSN 2413-8703.
- Domansky, Yu. V. (2019). Рок-театр сейчас: к проблеме идентификации и описания // Русская рок-поэзия: текст и контекст [Rock Theater Now: To the Problem of Identification and Description // Russian Rock Poetry: Text and Context] (in Russian). Vol. 22. Кафедра теории литературы Тверского государственного университета. pp. 100–132. ISSN 2413-8703.
- Egorov, E. A. (2000). Особенности функционирования «условных» образов в рок-поэзии // Русская рок-поэзия: текст и контекст [Features of functioning of “conventional” images in rock poetry // Russian rock poetry: text and context] (in Russian). Vol. 4. Кафедра теории литературы Тверского государственного университета. pp. 23–28. ISSN 2413-8703.
- Zhurkova, D. A. (2018). Режиссёрский слух: музыка в фильмах Балабанова // Большой формат: экранная культура в эпоху трансмедийности [Director's Hearing: Music in Balabanov's Films // Big Format: Screen Culture in the Age of Transmedia] (PDF) (in Russian). Vol. 3. Издательские решения, Государственный институт искусствознания. pp. 53–118. ISBN 978-5-4493-7922-1.
- Nezhdanova, N. K. (2016). Особенности реализации категории «Движение» в идентификационном поле русской рок-поэзии (на примере текстов группы «Пилот») [Features of the realization of the category “Movement” in the identification field of Russian rock poetry (on the example of the texts of the group “Pilot”)] (PDF) (in Russian). Русская рок-поэзия: текст и контекст: Журнал. — Уральский государственный педагогический университет. pp. 225–239. ISSN 2413-8703.
- Savitskaya, E. A. (2004). «АукцЫон» // Эстрада России. XX век. Энциклопедия [“AuktsYon” // Estrada Rossii. XX century. Encyclopedia] (in Russian). М.: ОЛМА-Пресс. pp. 49–50. ISBN 5-2240-4462-6.

=== Media sources ===
- Alekseev A., Dolzhansky V. (2006). «АукцЫон» (Санкт-Петербург) // Кто есть кто в российской рок-музыке. Энциклопедия [“AuktsYon” (St. Petersburg) // Who is Who in Russian rock music. Encyclopedia] (in Russian). М.: Астрель, АСТ, ТранзитКнига. pp. 66–69.
- Baranov, Yu. K. (2016). Стать ещё более плохим [To be even worse] (in Russian). Литературная газета: Газета. ISSN 0233-4305.
- Burlaka, A. P. (2007). Рок-энциклопедия: Популярная музыка в Ленинграде — Петербурге. 1965—2005 [Rock Encyclopedia: Popular music in Leningrad-St. Petersburg. 1965-2005] (in Russian). Vol. 1. СПб.: Амфора. p. 414. ISBN 978-5-3670-0362-8.
- Kozarev, M. N. (2007). Мой рок-н-ролл. Трилогия [My rock and roll. Trilogy] (in Russian). Vol. Black book. М.: Гаятри. p. 193.
- Leibin V. E., Blagoeva D. (2015). Слова не выкинешь. Какие песни мы поем в душе и какими стихами говорим [You can't get the words out. What songs we sing in shower and what verses we speak with] (in Russian). Русский репортёр: Журнал. pp. 10–19. ISSN 1993-758X.
- Margolis, M. M. (2010). АукцЫон. Книга учёта жизни [Auktyon. The ledger of life]. Дискография (in Russian). СПб.: Амфора. p. 304. ISBN 978-5-3670-1615-4.
- Margolis, M. M. (2015). Дом на колёсах и спорная «Птица» / Сам себе он // Аукцыон: иллюстрированная история группы [A house on wheels and controversial “Bird” / Himself // Auktsyon: illustrated history of the band]. Легенды нашего рока (in Russian). СПб.: Амфора. pp. 64–67 / 75–81.
- Chernin, A. A. (2007). Группа «АукцЫон». Альбом «Птица» // Другая история [The group “AuktsYon”. Album “Bird” // Other History]. Наша музыка (in Russian). СПб.: Амфора. pp. 377–412. ISBN 978-5-3670-0392-5.

=== Fiction ===
- Aktsynov, A. V. (2016). Нам нужна другая Россия! // Бретёр [We need another Russia! // The Duelist] (in Russian). М.: Центрполиграф. pp. 28–32. ISBN 978-5-2270-5797-6.
