= The Bell (newspaper) =

Russian newspaper

- Type: Online newspaper
- Format: Electronic publishing
- Founder(s): Yelizaveta Osetinskaya, Irina Malkova and Peter Mironenko
- Founded: 2017; 9 years ago
- Language: Russian, English
- Country: Russia
- Website: en.thebell.io

The Bell is an independent online newspaper in Russia, described by Bloomberg in 2022 as "one of the last Russian independent news sources still standing".

== History ==
The Bell was founded in 2017 by Yelizaveta Osetinskaya, the former editor of Vedomosti, and the Russian edition of Forbes, alongside three other journalists; Elizaveta Osetinskaya, Irina Malkova and Peter Mironenko who had previously worked at the RBK Group, before leaving due to government overreach. The Bell has been cited by several western media companies, such as Axios due to their expertise in Russian politics. The newspaper has been critical of not only the Russian Government but also of the Russian invasion of Ukraine calling it "unprovoked".

In 2023, the Russian government blocked all access of the website within Russia, labeling The Bell and its founders as "foreign agents". The Bell was banned in the same decree as Mediazona, Meduza, and Novaya Gazeta. Rights groups have decried the banning as an effort by the Russian government to control the Russian information space and prevent negative coverage of the war in Ukraine.

On 29 June 2023, The Bell received international attention when it reported that the Russian government was seizing Yevgeny Prigozhin's "Patriot" media holdings and the RIA FAN after the failed Wagner Group rebellion.
