= Yulia Paliychuk =

Ukrainian spokeswoman

- Юлія Володимирівна Палійчук
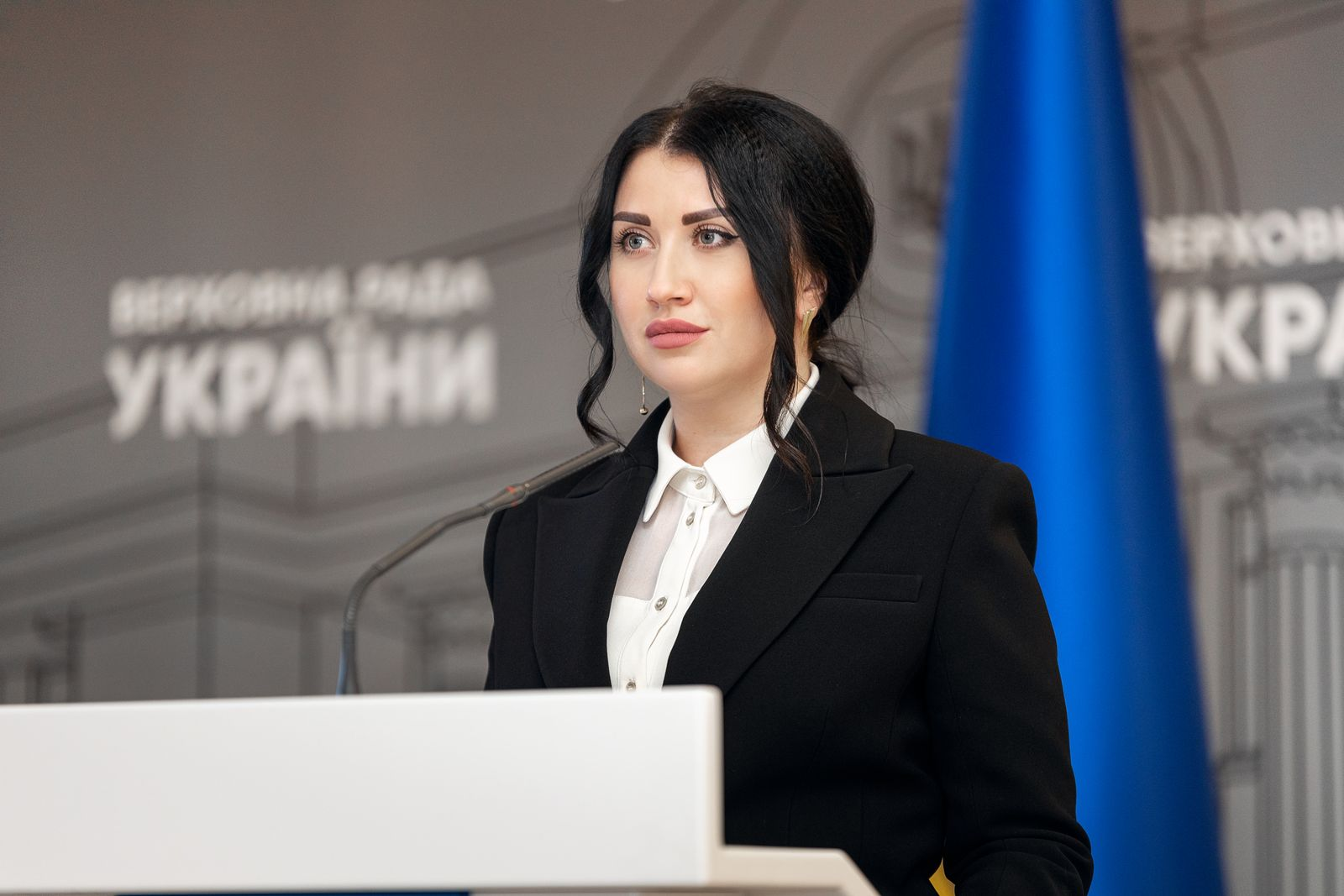

Spokeswoman of the Servant of the People in the Verkhovna Rada of Ukraine
- Incumbent
- Assumed office 2019
- President: Volodymyr Zelenskyy

Personal details
- Born: 27 May 1987 (age 38) Shepetivka, Khmelnytskyi Oblast, Ukrainian SSR
- Occupation: spokeswoman

Yulia Paliychuk (Ukrainian: Юлія Володимирівна Палійчук; born 27 May 1987, Shepetivka, Khmelnytskyi Oblast, Ukraine) is a Ukrainian spokeswoman, journalist, jurist, entrepreneur and politician.

Since September 2019, she became the spokeswoman of the Servant of the People in the Verkhovna Rada of Ukraine.

== Journalist career ==
In 2007—2009, she worked as a correspondent for Gazeta 24.

In 2009–2015, Paliychuk was a parliamentary correspondent for the online publication MIGnews.

In 2010—2012, she worked for the RBC Ukraine news agency as a parliamentary correspondent. In 2013, Paliychuk worked for the Focus magazine as a parliamentary correspondent.

== Entrepreneurship ==
In 2015, she founded the women's clothing brand PALIYCHUK.

== Political career ==
In July 2019, Paliychuk was a candidate for People's Deputies of Ukraine, no. 150 in the electoral list of the political party Servant of the People.
