= CNews (magazine) =

Russian information technology publication

- Editor: Alexandra Kiryanova
- Categories: Technology
- Founded: 2000
- Language: Russian, English
- Website: www.cnews.ru

CNews (pronounced "C-News") is a Russian publication, Internet portal and a monthly magazine of the same name dedicated to telecommunications, information technology, software, and computer games.

== History ==
The CNews Internet portal has been operating since August 2000.

The former owner of C-News is RBK Group.

CNews magazine has been published since December 2004 and is aimed at heads of IT departments and high-tech specialists. Distributed in Moscow (45% of the circulation), St. Novgorod, Samara, Perm, Kazan and Rostov-on-Don. Distribution is carried out through the base of subscribers, as well as at specialized conferences and seminars. An archive of all issues of the journal is available for free download on the official website.

Since 2018, it has been developing as an independent company. In September 2018, Kommersant, citing its sources, reported that CNews had been sold to its editor-in-chief Maxim Kazak and CEO Eduard Erkole. Director is Eduard Erkola, editor-in-chief since 2018. In September 2018, Kommersant, citing its sources, reported that CNews had been sold to its editor-in-chief Maxim Kazak and CEO Eduard Erkole.

== Other work ==
The following agencies work within C-News: CNews Analytics, which is part of the RBK Group and develops ratings, reviews, research CNews Conferences organizing conferences, round tables and other events.

== Reception ==
Repeatedly recognized Medialogy as the most cited media in the field of telecommunications and information technology. It has twice won the Runet Prize.
