= Yosyp Pintus =

Ukrainian businessman (born 1981)

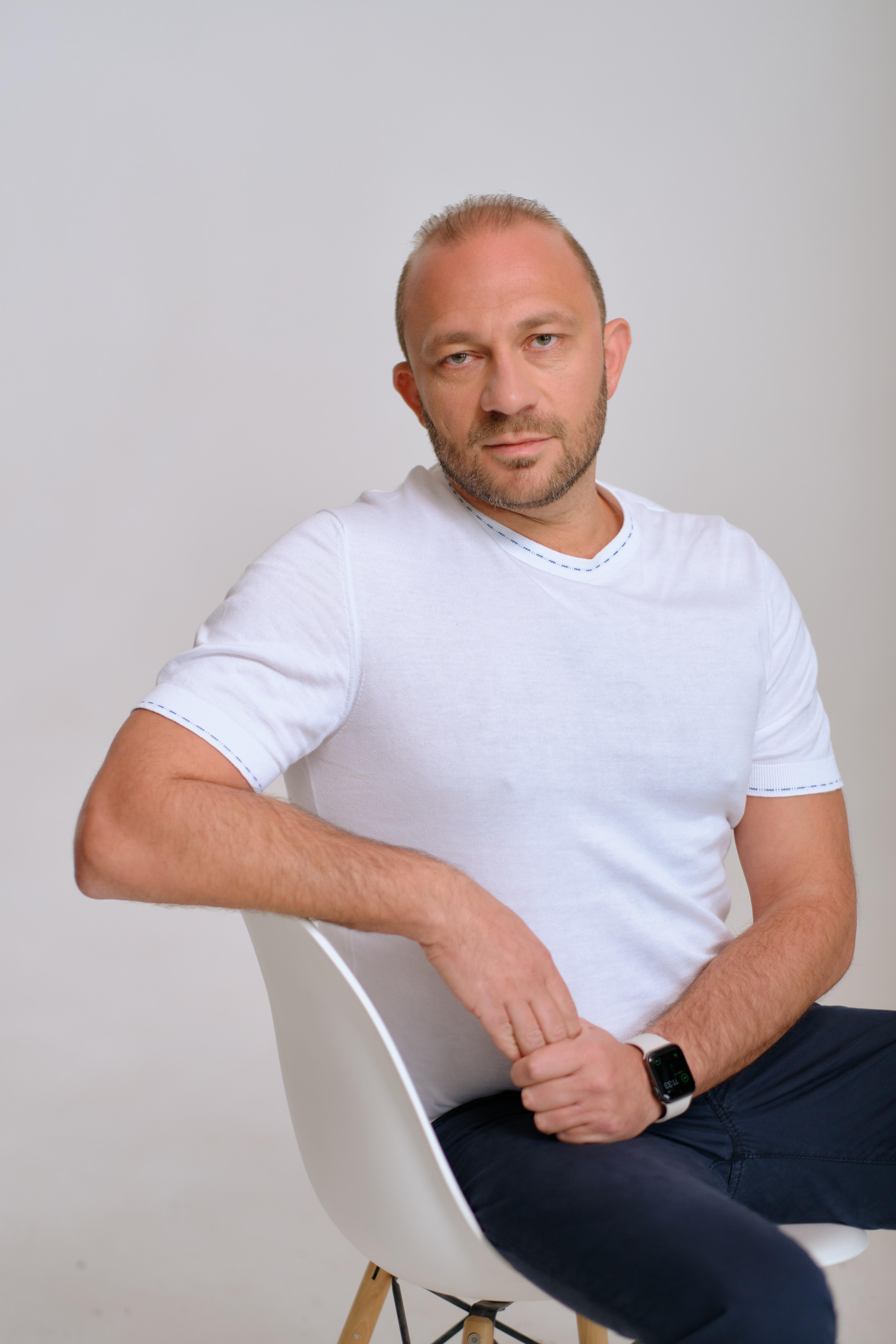
- Born: Йо́сип Генна́дійович Пі́нтус; September 25, 1981 (age 44)
- Other name: Iosif (Joseph) Pintus
- Occupations: Businessman, entrepreneur
- Known for: founder and owner of RBC-Ukraine

Yosyp Gennadiyovych Pintus (also referred to as Joseph or Ioseph by first name; born September 25, 1981) is a Ukrainian media proprietor and businessman who is the co-founder, CEO, and director of the information agency RBC-Ukraine initially founded in 2006 as a division of the Russian agency RBC. In 2010, "RBC-Ukraine llc." became independent of its Russian holding company, and in 2015 it completely came under the control of Pintus. RBC (Russia) attempted to challenge this in court but lost the case.

Pintus is also the director of LLC "RBC-Ukraine", the company that was the operator of the site rbc.ua until 2015, daughter company of TOV "Mass Media Group". Until 2012, "Mass Media Group" was owned by the Cypriot company "RBC Investments (Cyprus) Limited", owned by Russian businessman Herman Kaplun. Kaplun remained the manager of its bank accounts in the Russian Federation. As of 2024, the company "Mass Media Group" is owned by THORNLEY INVESTMENTS LTD, which is listed among the companies affiliated with the Russian holding company RBK Group.

== Biography ==
Joseph (Iosif) Pintus was born in Ufa (Bashkir ASSR). He graduated from high school No. 11 in Mykolaiv. In 2003, he graduated from the law faculty of the National Academy of Management in Kyiv.

That same year, he started his business: the hosting company "Ukrainian Business Technologies". The money received from the hosting provider was decided to be invested in the banner business, popular at that time in Ukraine. Therefore, in 2004, he launched the banner network "MBN" (Master Banner Network). It included exclusively online media, and the main condition for cooperation was the placement of the banner in the most advantageous place. Thus, the overall high CTR of the network was achieved, and it was beneficial for information platforms to exchange such advertising. By the early 2000s, MBN becomes one of the most popular advertising networks in Ukraine.

In 2006, Yosyp Pintus and Volodymyr Shultz, together with "RosBusinessConsulting" ("RBC"), founded the Ukrainian information agency "RBC-Ukraine", which as of February 2020 is the most visited among Ukrainian online publications, according to data from the international online research agency Gemius.

In 2008, he opened the commodity-news media platform "Traffim", which by 2019 was among the three largest traffic networks in Ukraine. That same year, Pintus left the founders of "MBN", and in 2019 left the owners of the "Traffim" platform, focusing the main attention on the development of the information agency.

Pintus is the only media businessman among the owners of the five most popular Ukrainian online media, which mostly belong to either oligarchs or officials.

== RBC-Ukraine ==
The news agency RBC-Ukraine was established in 2006 as a branch of the Russian media holding RBC Information Systems. Until 2010, the agency operated under a license from the Russian RosBusinessConsulting. Since 2012, RBC-Ukraine has had no connection with the Russian RBC beyond the brand name. This was indirectly confirmed by the absence of mentions of the Ukrainian agency in the annual report of the Russian RBC for 2010.

In April 2015, the founder of the RBC-Ukraine (certificate No. 402—264 PR from 4 June 2015) news agency became the company UBT. The trade mark "RBC" (certificate No. 58683 from 11 October 2005) in Ukraine belongs to the company "RBC-Media". Pintus serves as the director of both companies.

The project quickly found its niche in the Ukrainian media market and continues to dynamically develop its audience. Moreover, in 2012, "RBC-Ukraine" received an award in the nomination "Internet Media of the Year" according to the "Person of the Year" program.

In 2014, the agency officially separated from its Russian partner, which soon led to its being blocked in the territory of the Russian Federation for "extremist materials". Journalists of the publication assumed that the formal reason for the blocking was an article titled "Putin died" (Russian: Путин умер), which appeared on the subsidiary project "Styler".

As of the beginning of 2020, "RBC-Ukraine" topped the ranking of the most visited Ukrainian internet publications, according to data from the international online research agency Gemius.

== Family ==
Pintus has two children.

He is Jewish.
