= Yuriy Parfyonov =

Russian musician (1946–2025)

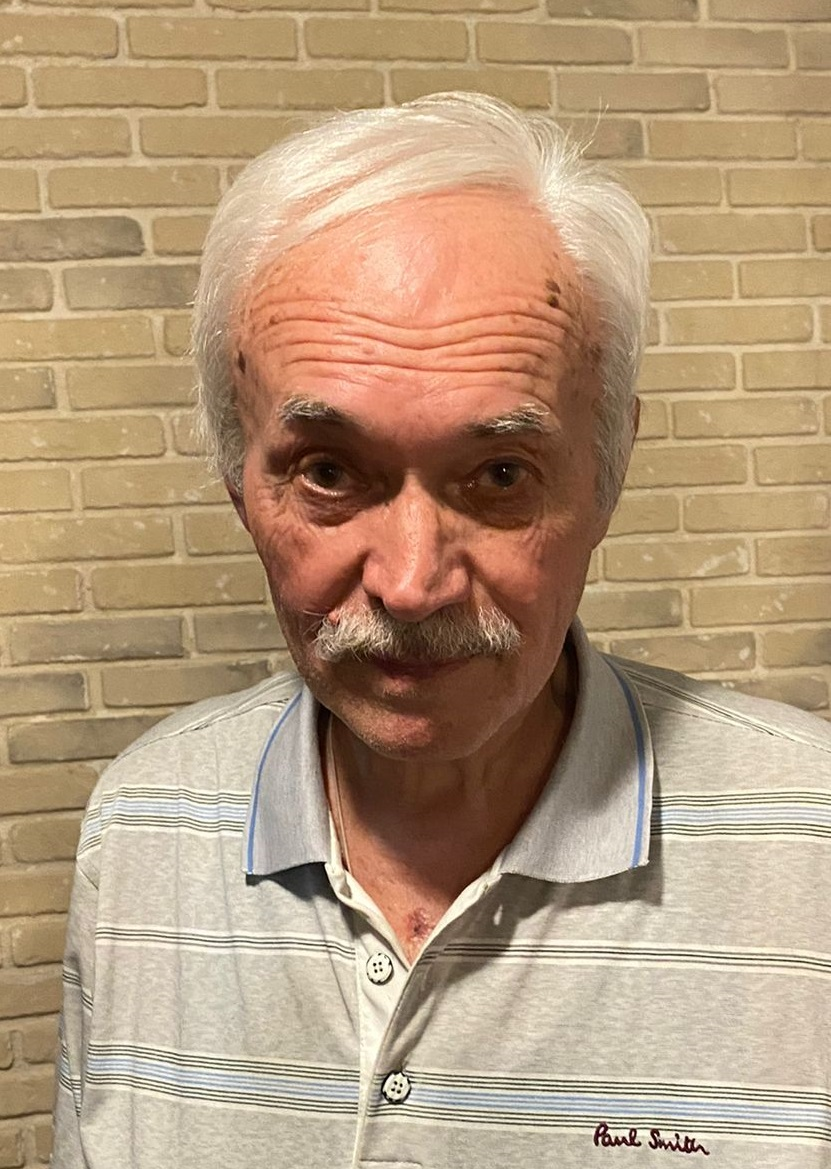
Parfyonov in 2022

Yuri Vasilyevich Parfyonov (Russian: Ю́рий Васи́льевич Парфёнов; 19 January 1946 – 23 June 2025) was a Russian jazz musician.

== Life and career ==
Parfyonov was born on 19 January 1946 in Bulgakovo, Bashkir ASSR, Russian SFSR, USSR. He began to play the trumpet in the brass band of the Palace of Pioneers in Frunze (now Bishkek, Kyrgyzstan). He graduated from the Frunze Music College and then the Tashkent State Conservatory. In 1984, he relocated to Balashikha, Moscow.

Beginning in 1984, Parfyonov worked in Oleg Lundstrem's orchestra, but occasionally assembled an ensemble to perform his own music. In 1992, he joined the free jazz ensemble "Three Ols" by Sergei Letov.

He became a Merited Artist of the Russian Federation (1997).

From 2011, he was a member of the group Auktyon.

Parfyonov died of cancer on 23 June 2025, at the age of 79.
