= Auktyon =

Russian avant-garde rock band from Saint Petersburg

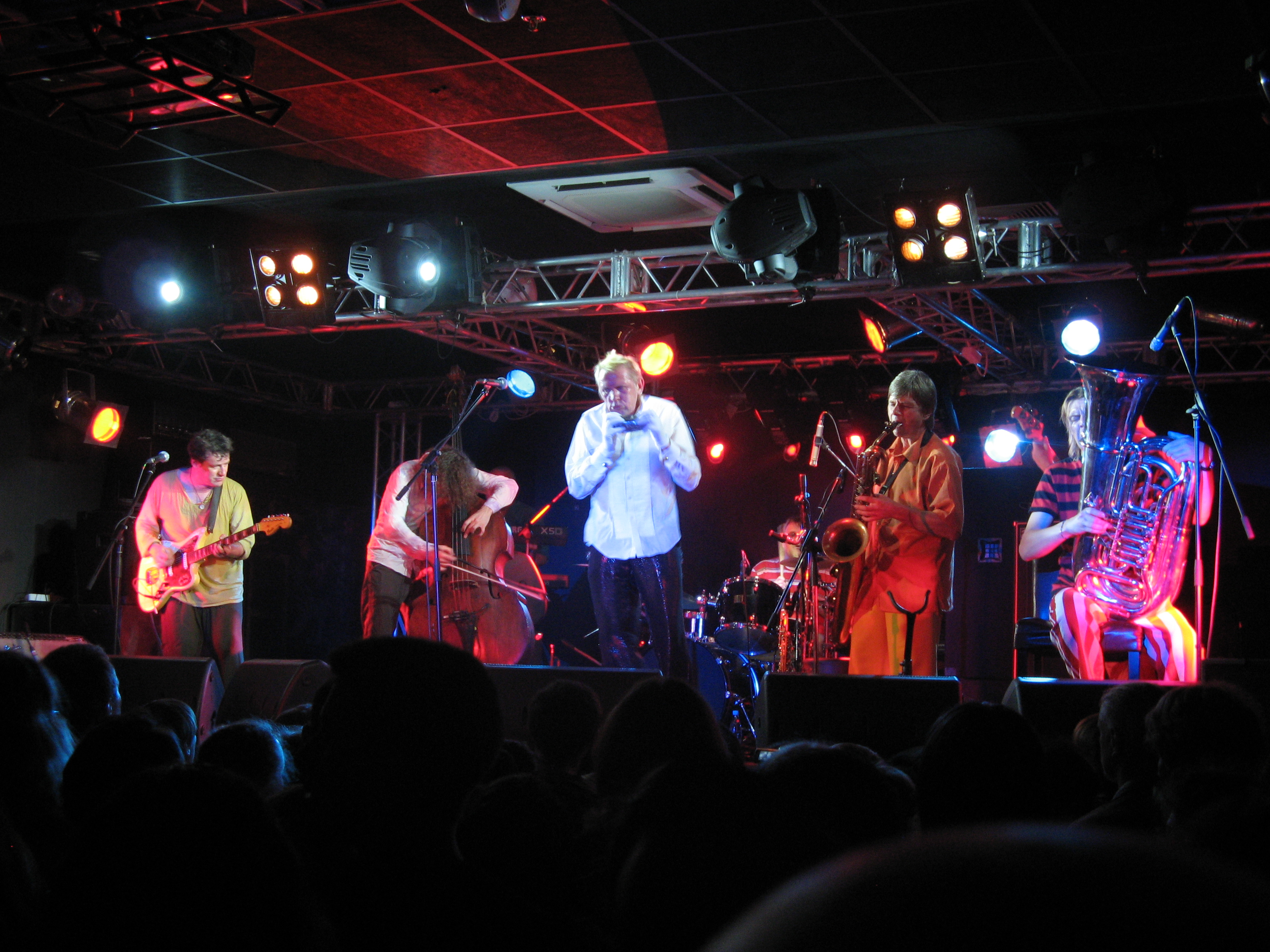

Background information
- Also known as: Блю Бойз (Blue Boys) (1980–1981); Параграф (Paragraph) (1981); Фаэтон (Phaeton) (1981–1983); Аукцион (Auction) (1983–1988)
- Origin: Leningrad, USSR (now Saint Petersburg, Russia)
- Genres: Art rock; avant-garde rock; post-punk; jazz fusion
- Years active: 1978–present
- Labels: Manchester Files; Volya Productions; Melodiya; SNC Records; BSA Records; Дядюшка Рекордс; Мистерия звука; Геометрия; Ulitka
- Members: Leonid Fedorov; Oleg Garkusha; Viktor Bondarik; Dmitriy Ozersky; Nikolay Rubanov; Boris Shaveinikov; Mikhail Kolovsky; Vladimir Volkov
- Past members: Evgeniy Chumichev; Sergey Gubenko; Sergey Lobachev; Arkadiy Volk; Sergey Rogozhin; Kirill Miller; Igor Cheridnik; Nikolay Fedorovich; Igor Skaldin; Pavel Litvinov; Dmitriy Matkovsky; Vladimir Vesyolkin; Evgeniy Dyatlov; Yuriy Parfyonov
- Website: http://www.auktyon.ru/

Auktyon (Russian: АукцЫон, pronounced [ɐʊktsɨˈon]. Auktsyon) is a Soviet and Russian avant-garde rock band from Saint Petersburg.

The band was founded by Leonid Fyodorov in 1978. Though they originally played post-punk and new wave, the group came to be influenced by European and Central Asian folk music, avant-garde jazz, the poetry of Russian futurist Velimir Khlebnikov, and aspects of Russian high culture and literature.

Auktyon was particularly popular from 1987 through 1995, but became less active in the late 1990s when Fyodorov began to produce records for Leningrad. The group continues to play together and to release new albums. They toured the United States in 2006 in support of their first US release, the album Pioneer. The group returned to the US in 2008 when they released the album Girls Sing. Between 2011 and 2020, Auktyon released several albums, while continuing to tour. The group also contributed to film projects, including the soundtrack for Aleksei Balabanov's Me Too (2012), and was featured in the 2014 documentary Eshche. Their twelfth studio album, Sokrovishche, was released in 2025.

== History ==
=== Early period ===
In the autumn of 1978, Leonid Fyodorov formed a band with his classmates. They started as a trio: Leonid Fyodorov (guitar), Dmitry Zaychenko (bass), and Alexey Vikhrev (drums). Two years later, two more of Fyodorov's school friends joined the group: Mikhail Makov (guitar, vocals) and Viktor Bondarik (bass), while Zaychenko switched to the organ. Around the same time, Sergey "Skvo" Skvortsov joined the group as a sound engineer and lighting technician. The band began performing at dances in 1981, changing its name from Blue Boys to Paragraph and subsequently to Phaeton.

Around 1979, Oleg Garkusha became acquainted with Fyodorov. The group initially rehearsed in Fyodorov's apartment, where he composed the music using texts found in various books and magazines. Garkusha subsequently contributed his poetry to the band's repertoire. The band later moved its rehearsals from Fyodorov's apartment to the Leningradets youth club, its first dedicated rehearsal space. At that time, the ensemble consisted of Alexey Vittel, Dmitry Zaychenko, Alexander Pompeyev (keyboards), Viktor Bondarik, and Mikhail Makov.

In 1980, Fyodorov met Dmitry Ozersky. Initially, Ozersky did not play any instruments and served solely as a lyricist. Following Fyodorov's advice, he began learning to play the keyboards—starting at a music school, though he later left the school and continued his studies independently.

By the spring of 1981, the lineup of Phaeton included: Leonid Fyodorov, Viktor Bondarik, Sergey Skvortsov, Dmitry Ozersky (keyboards), Sergey Melnik (guitar), and Yevgeny Chumichev (drums), as well as Oleg Garkusha—who, depending on the circumstances, served as a sound engineer, manager, and roadie, while also providing sound effects on stage.

=== Joining the Leningrad Rock Club ===
In 1983, the band's bassist, Viktor Bondarik, began his military service and was replaced by Sergey Gubenko. Unsure of his own vocal abilities, Fyodorov invited Valery Nedomovny to serve as lead singer. Oleg Garkusha introduced the band—which was still called Phaeton at the time—to the group Aquarium. Mikhail Feinstein, who was a member of Aquarium back then, advised them to join the newly founded Leningrad Rock Club.

On May 14, 1983, the band was admitted to the Rock Club as a candidate member and learned the date for their debut concert (scheduled for late autumn 1983). The lineup shifted: Nedomovny (vocals) and Melnik (guitar) left the band and were replaced by guitarist and singer Sergey Lobachev. In preparation for their first major performance, the band members chose a new name while browsing through a dictionary, but did not get beyond the letter "A" before settling on "Auktyon".

The debut concert took place on November 18, 1983 and, according to the band members, did not go particularly well. Following the concert, Lobachev, Gubenko, and Chumichev left the group. The band experienced a series of other setbacks, including losing access to its rehearsal space and the theft of its equipment. Although the band had officially joined the Rock Club, a two-year period of inactivity followed (lasting until 1985). During this time, they were working on new material and about ten different drummers, guitarists, bassists, and singers passed through Auktyon, though none managed to establish a permanent place in the band.

=== 1985–1986. Reunion and Come Back to Sorrento ===
By early 1985, following a hiatus, Auktyon resumed active rehearsals. The band's lineup stabilized: Bondarik (who had returned from military service) on bass, Ozersky on keyboards, Igor Cheridnik on drums, and Nikolai Fedorovich on alto saxophone. The band began working on a new program of songs. Fedorov, feeling insecure about his own singing, invited vocalist Sergey Rogozhin (whom Ozersky had "discovered") to join the band:

I walked into the Metallistov Palace of Culture and saw an empty hall with a panel of judges <…> It was absolute madness on stage: Garkusha was darting around with his bizarre, jerky movements, and Lenya Fedorov was singing—at the time, he couldn't seem to pronounce about 32 letters of the alphabet! <…> The judges watched for a while and finally delivered their verdict: 'Either take your lead singer to a speech therapist, or replace him, don't you think?' The members of Auktyon stood there, looking bewildered. They turned to the judges and declared, 'We do have a lead singer. He's right there—sitting in the audience.' Lenya was pointing at me—even though he had never seen or heard me before that moment! It was a complete gamble. And I didn't know a single Auktyon song! <…> As I walked toward the stage, I frantically wondered, 'What on earth am I going to sing?' Then, it hit me. Back in Zaporizhzhia, where I grew up, a Hungarian band called Piramis had come to perform <…> There was one rock ballad of theirs that I had absolutely loved. That's the one I decided to perform. So, I began to sing it—a cappella—in Hungarian!… When I finished, a few scattered claps rang out behind me. It was the members of Auktyon themselves, applauding. Someone from the audience remarked: 'Well, it turns out you have an excellent lead singer—every word can be heard! Why didn't you mention him before?'

— Sergey Rogozhin, Tabloid

Artist Kirill Miller also joined the group, taking charge of stage design and the musicians' visual style. In May 1986, the band gave a successful performance at the 4th Leningrad Rock Festival with a lineup consisting of Leonid Fedorov (guitar, vocals), Oleg Garkusha (dancing, vocals), Sergey Rogozhin (vocals), Viktor Bondarik (bass), Dmitry Ozersky (keyboards, vocals), Nikolai Rubanov (saxophones, flutes), Nikolai Fedorovich (saxophone), and Igor Cheridnik (drums). Rogozhin received an award for best vocals, while Oleg Garkusha was recognized for his stage presence. At the invitation of journalist and promoter Andrei Kolomoisky, the group also played two concerts at the Sever club in the city of Vyborg.

Upon their return, the band began performing periodically at various community centers. One of these shows was recorded by Sergey Firsov and subsequently circulated as a cassette tape titled Rio-de-Shushary. The recording is considered a rarity though in 2014, it was reissued on CD as part of the album D'observer.

Fedorov, eager to capture their successful set on tape, led the group through various recording sessions to produce the album Vernis v Sorrento (Return to Sorrento), which was not officially released until several years later.

=== 1987: A New Program and Lineup Changes ===
By 1987, Auktyon had already become a popular band. They made a cameo appearance in the film The Burglar, with Oleg Garkusha playing a supporting role as a friend of the protagonist. Fedorov and Ozersky prepared a new set of songs titled Everything Is Calm in Baghdad (V Bagdade vse spokoyno). Meanwhile, saxophonist Nikolai Fedorovich left the band. According to Ozersky, the material was inspired by the works of E.T.A. Hoffmann, envisioned as a kind of magical land: "We imagined this 'dreamland' as something like the United Arab Emirates—perhaps one where the oil had run out, or something similar. In essence, these were purely speculative attempts to transpose Hoffmann's world into our own contemporary reality."

The program Everything Is Calm in Baghdad was performed at the 5th Leningrad Rock Club Festival on June 6, 1987. Its theatrical staging featured Eastern-inspired elements, including robes and turbans. Despite its elaborate presentation, the program received a largely negative critical response. According to Leonid Fyodorov, it had been developed specifically for vocalist Sergei Rogozhin, who announced his departure from Auktyon after the performance, having accepted an invitation to join Forum. Guitarist Igor Skaldin joined briefly, followed by Dmitry Matkovsky, and the lineup was further bolstered by the addition of percussionist Pavel Litvinov. Dancer Vladimir Vesyolkin also joined the group. Ultimately, the band set aside the Everything Is Calm in Baghdad program and began working on new material.

=== 1988: How I Became a Traitor ===
Following an active touring schedule in 1987, violinist and vocalist Yevgeny Dyatlov joined the band. In May 1988, the group began recording the album How I Became a Traitor (Kak ya stal predatelem), marking their first experience working in a professional studio environment. The album's title was taken from a line in a poem by Oleg Garkusha, "That's How I Became a Traitor"—a phrase inspired by a television program about a former TASS employee who had become a spy. This line was later incorporated into the lyrics of the song "New Year's Song" ("Novogodnyaya pesnya"), which appears on the album. For reasons unknown, Kirill Miller, who designed the album artwork, rendered the title as How I Became a Traitor (Kak ya stal predatelem). "We moved away from songs that came, so to speak, from the 'head'—from a purely intellectual approach—toward somewhat more metaphysical material, attempting to push beyond the boundaries we had set for ourselves. While working on this material, I felt a sense of personal growth; I realized I was maturing and beginning to think differently than I had before", noted Dmitry Ozersky. On June 5, 1988, the band presented this material at the 6th Leningrad Rock Festival. In his diary, Vladimir Veselkin described the concert: "It was a triumph for the band. Everything was being filmed." Dissatisfied with what he perceived as a secondary role within the group, Dyatlov announced his departure.

Throughout the summer and autumn of 1988, the band toured extensively across the USSR. Meanwhile, drummer Igor Cheridnik left to join the band Igry, prompting an urgent search for a replacement. After considering several other candidates, the position was filled by Boris Shaveynikov, who joined the band just before their tour of the Far East. It is to Boris that the band owes its name; he wrote it with a deliberate misspelling—"AuktsYon" (АукцЫон). The band liked the name, and it stuck. At the end of 1988, the group took part in a memorial concert for Alexander Bashlachev at the Luzhniki Sports Palace.

Late that year, the December issue of Aurora magazine published a list of the best Soviet rock albums, compiled over the previous six months based on the opinions of critics and readers. Not a single Auktyon record appeared on the 25-album list. Nevertheless, the band's recordings found a certain level of success in the West, and in 1989, the group embarked on its first tour abroad.

=== 1989: Tours Abroad ===
On February 1, 1989, Auktyon arrived in Berlin, accompanied by the bands Zvuki Mu and Va-Bank, as well as singer Ekaterina Surzhikova. Two months later, the band toured France alongside Kino and Zvuki Mu to promote the French release of How I Became a Traitor (Kak ya stal predatelem). It was also in France that the band had a momentous encounter with Alexei Khvostenko—a figure who would later play a significant role in both the band's own work and the solo projects of Leonid Fyodorov. These trips to France were also linked to a well-known scandal involving the band. During a festival in Le Bourget, Vladimir Veselkin performed a mock striptease while the song "Nepman" was playing, ending up in nothing but flesh-colored undergarments. This incident drew negative coverage in the Soviet newspapers Sovetskaya Kultura and Komsomolskaya Pravda. Komsomolskaya Pravda published an article titled "Pop Music? Showing off real skill proved difficult—so they showed off bad taste instead", accusing the band of vulgarity and poor taste. Vladimir Veselkin gathered signatures from prominent figures in the Leningrad cultural scene and succeeded in getting an "Open Letter from the Band Auktyon" published in the May 12, 1989, issue of Sovetskaya Kultura. Komsomolskaya Pravda offered no response. Later, Veselkin repeated the act during the television program Musical Ring. The performance was poorly received, prompting a comment from the audience: "Your deliberately degenerate performance style serves to discredit Soviet rock". That summer, the band recorded the album Everything Is Calm in Baghdad at the Leningrad Recording Studio. On the night of June 11–12, 1989, Auktyon closed out the final (seventh) Leningrad Rock Festival. During rehearsals that year, the band was already actively playing the tracks "Airplane", "Pioneer", "Love", and "Tattletale"—songs that would soon make up their next album.

=== 1990–1991: Zhopa and Bodun ===
By 1990, the band was actively working on new material. A friendship developed between bassist Viktor Bondarik and drummer Boris Shaveynikov, which helped strengthen the band's rhythm section. Fyodorov arranged for the band to record at Stas Namin's SNC studio, where the album Zhopa (Ass) was recorded in the winter of 1990. The 1990 vinyl release featured a truncated version of the album, omitting two tracks, while its original title was changed to Duplo ("Hollow/Cavity") because the word Zhopa was considered unacceptable for an official release under Soviet censorship. Also in 1990, the album V Bagdade vsyo spokoyno (All Is Quiet in Baghdad), recorded in 1989, was released by the Melodiya label. In May and June, the band took part in the Volga-90 riverboat tour organized by the Rock of Rock of Clean Water (Rok chistoy vody) environmental movement.

In 1991, the band recorded the album Bodun (Hangover). Its cover art was the last designed by Kirill Miller. The song "Stolby" ("Pillars") was omitted from the album's initial release because its lyrics contained an obscene word. The band's sound changed significantly following Shaveynikov's arrival; Fyodorov described him as a "heavy" drummer. The first album recorded with Shaveynikov, Zhopa, differed considerably from the band's previous work. The material became darker and more improvisational. Already regarded as one of the top bands from the Soviet Union, the band toured extensively in Germany, with the tours organized by a German named Christoph Karsten. The band members became increasingly concerned about Vesyolkin's alcohol-related behavior and his increasingly disruptive stage performances. Miller and Vesyolkin gradually distanced themselves from the collective. Garkusha also struggled with alcohol abuse. In May 1992, Vesyolkin stopped performing with Auktyon and concentrated on his solo projects.

=== Mid-1990s. Chainik vina (A Teapot of Wine) and Ptitsa (Bird) ===
Fedorov had long harbored the idea of recording songs by his friend Alexei Khvostenko. However, Khvostenko lived in France—a country where Auktyon had little time to spare during their tours. In 1992, having finally secured the necessary paperwork, Khvostenko arrived in Russia aboard a plane carrying humanitarian aid. The band, joined by Khvostenko, recorded the album Chainik vina at the Titanic studio in St. Petersburg in 1992, completing the recording in approximately two weeks. Fedorov would later describe it as one of Auktyon's finest works. During this period, Auktyon began touring Europe more frequently, even purchasing a used bus for the purpose.

In 1993, the band began recording the album Ptitsa (Bird), which would go on to become one of their most popular releases. This was largely due to the inclusion of the song "The Road" on the soundtrack for Alexei Balabanov's highly successful film Brother 2 (Brat-2), released in 2000. The recording process, including rehearsals, took about six months. The title track was composed by Fedorov and Garkusha while they were staying in the countryside during the attempted coup.

Relations within the band were strained at the time; according to Fedorov, the group was on the verge of breaking up. Nevertheless, the other band members were pleased with the album. While Fedorov considers the individual songs on the record to be among the best he and Ozersky ever wrote, he generally views Ptitsa as one of the band's failures.

While putting Chainik vina together, I realized that we had recorded what I consider to be a brilliant album." It suddenly dawned on me that you could create amazing things using minimal resources, without having to come up with anything particularly elaborate. Ptitsa [Bird] was an attempt to record something like that—without Khvost, just with Auktyon. But the attempt failed. We couldn't manage to make a simple record; the arrangements ruined Ptitsa. Our previous albums—Kak ya stal predatelem [How I Became a Traitor], Bodun, and Zhopa [Ass]—were recorded exactly the way we wanted them to be; they are far more coherent than Ptitsa.

— Leonid Fyodorov, Margolis (2010)

The album was released in two editions, six months apart (a German version and a Russian version).

=== The Second Half of the 1990s ===
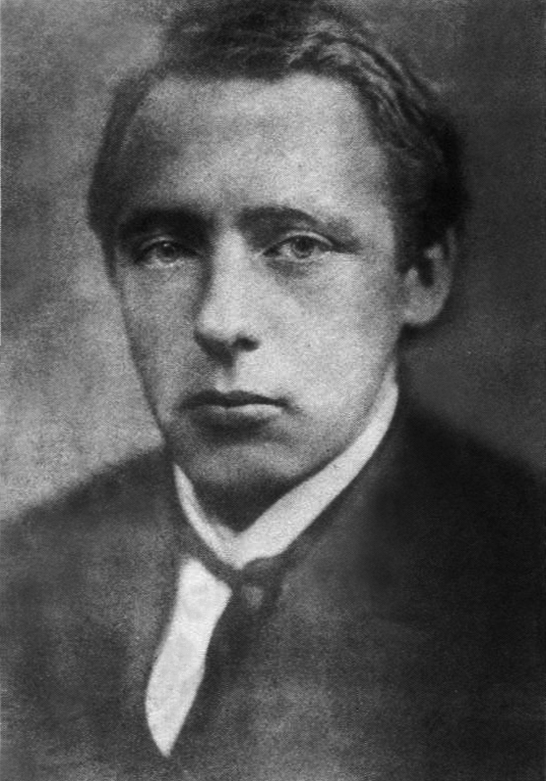
Auktyon explored the poetry of Velimir Khlebnikov in collaboration with avant-garde poet Alexei Khvostenko. Their 1995 album Zhilets vershin (Dweller of the Peaks) combines Khlebnikov's poems, selected and adapted by Khvostenko, with music by the band, creating a new interpretation of the poet's work.

Following the album Ptitsa, Auktyon entered a period of reduced creative activity. The band subsequently collaborated with Alexei Khvostenko on Zhilets vershin (Dweller of the Peaks) (1995), an album featuring poems by Velimir Khlebnikov selected and adapted by Khvostenko.

The band's activity within Russia began to decline, though Auktyon continued to tour Europe (with particularly frequent performances in Germany). In November 1995, guitarist Dmitry Matkovsky was dismissed from the group. According to Ozersky, the conflict stemmed from both musical differences—Matkovsky favored a more disciplined approach to performance, while saxophonist Rubanov advocated for improvisation—and personal friction. Matkovsky was replaced by tuba player Mikhail Kolovsky. On July 22, 1996, Oleg Garkusha traveled to America to undergo treatment for alcoholism; he stopped drinking thereafter.

In 1997, the albums Vernis v Sorrento (Return to Sorrento) and D'observer (a recording of a 1986 concert at the Pulkovo Observatory) were officially released for the first time. That same year, Fyodorov released his debut solo album, the acoustic Chetyrespolovinoytonny (Four and a Half Tons).

Throughout the late 1990s and early 2000s, Leonid Fyodorov focused on solo projects, collaborating with various other musicians, and producing albums for Leningrad. In 1999, the band released two singles: Zimy ne budet (There Won't Be a Winter), credited to "Auktyon, Volkov, Kurashov," and Nebo napopolam (Sky Split in Half), a collaboration between the band and Leonid Soybelman.

=== From 2000 to the Present ===
Auktyon performing Eto Mama (This Is Mom) at the Gorbunov Palace of Culture in Moscow, October 2002.

In October 2002, Auktyon released Eto Mama (This Is Mom), an album featuring newly recorded live-style performances of previously performed material alongside two new songs. On December 15, 2005, the percussionist Pavel Litvinov died after suffering another stroke following his discharge from hospital.

Auktyon toured the United States in 2006 in support of their first US release, the compilation album Pioneer. The next full-length studio album, Devushki Poyut (Girls Are Singing), was released in 2007, following a 12-year hiatus. It was recorded in New York at Stratosphere Sound Studios, with contributions from American musicians Marc Ribot, John Medeski, Frank London, and Ned Rothenberg, alongside Russian double bassist Vladimir Volkov. In 2008 and 2009, they toured the US again in support of the album.

On October 7, 2011, Auktyon officially presented its album Yula (Spinning Top) in Moscow. Recorded at the Parametrika studio in Moscow over eleven days, the album featured additional contributions from Vladimir Volkov and trumpeter Yuriy Parfyonov. Volkov had officially joined the band by this time, while Parfyonov became a permanent member following the album's recording.

In 2012, Aleksei Balabanov's film Me Too (Я тоже хочу) was released. Oleg Garkusha played the character of the "The Musician", while songs by Leonid Fyodorov featured prominently in the film's soundtrack.

In 2013, the band celebrated its 30th anniversary with a series of concerts in Russia and Ukraine. In December, the band marked the 20th anniversary of its album Ptitsa with special concerts in Moscow and Saint Petersburg. At the Moscow performance on December 15, the group performed the entire album.

In 2014, the documentary film Eshche (Encore), directed by Dmitry Lavrinenko, was released. Filmed over the course of seven years, the project followed Auktyon on tour and documented the band's everyday life and creative process, including the recording sessions for the album Yula. During a recording trip to the United States with John Medeski and Marc Ribot, Lavrinenko also handed the camera to the musicians themselves. The film premiered at the Beat Film Festival in Moscow in June 2014 and entered theatrical distribution in September. A nationwide screening tour began on September 18, with screenings planned in 15 Russian cities and Belarus. In an interview with Colta, Leonid Fedorov also mentioned that Lavrinenko was working on a second film focusing on his solo career and musical collaborations with Vladimir Volkov, Sergey Starostin, and others.

On December 4, 2014, a posthumous album titled Scorpion was released in memory of Alexey Khvostenko, featuring musicians from the band Auktyon. The 22-track album consists of Khvostenko reciting his own poetry and fables co-written with Anri Volokhonsky, accompanied by musical arrangements created by Anatoly Gerasimov and members of Auktyon. Work on the album spanned nearly a decade, from 2004 to 2013, during which both Khvostenko and Gerasimov died. Khvostenko's daughter Anna subsequently assisted the musicians as a "critic and advisor." The album was named after the included poem "Under the Sign of the Scorpion" ("Pod znakom Skorpiona"), following a suggestion by Vladimir Volkov. Leonid Fedorov served as the album's producer, with much of the recording taking place at his apartment; he also mixed the tracks in his home studio.

In October 2015, the band recorded their next full-length album, Na solntse (In the Sun), at the Mosfilm studio. The album was released in June 2016. In August 2019, it was reported that Auktyon was recording a new album at the Mosfilm studio, while an unnamed solo album by Leonid Fyodorov was undergoing mastering there. The album, titled Mechty (Dreams), was released on April 24, 2020. The first single, "Tisha", was released on April 4, followed by the title track, "Mechty", on April 14. Music videos were produced for both songs.

On December 9, 2022, a remastered reissue of the album Devushki Poyut was released, featuring bonus CD and DVD discs that include improvisational tracks recorded during the studio sessions, as well as a concert film documenting the album's launch at the B1 Maximum venue.

On November 21, 2025, the band's twelfth studio album, Sokrovishche (Treasure), was released. It consists of eight songs, two of which—"Boroda" ("Beard") and "Musulmanin" ("Muslim")—were accompanied by music videos. This album featured a final composition by Yuri Parfyonov, who died in June 2025. Shortly before his death, he wrote the instrumental ballad "Yurochka", which was dedicated to him.

== Artistry ==
=== Musical style ===
Auktyon's music has been described in terms of art rock, avant-garde rock, and post-punk, although critics have frequently emphasized the difficulty of assigning the band to a single genre. A 2006 Boston Globe profile described its sound as one that "resists category", while a 2003 article in the Russian newspaper Moskovsky Komsomolets stated that "there is no one to compare them to" and identified traces of ska, reggae, and nu-jazz. Greg Quill of the Toronto Star similarly characterized the group as "unlike anything we've heard in the West", noting the difficulty of fitting its music into familiar stylistic categories. Afisha notes that the band has a style for which there is no convincing parallel.

The band's music combines elements of rock with jazz and folk traditions. Contemporary descriptions have associated it with art rock, post-punk, free jazz, Latin percussion and the sound of military marching bands. A 2005 Willamette Week article described Auktyon's approach as a form of genre-splicing, identifying influences from Russian folk music, avant-jazz, jazz fusion, and psychedelic music of the 1960s. A 2008 review in The Philadelphia Inquirer further identified psychedelic grooves, 1980s pop and contemporary ethnic fusion, particularly Slavic folk music and ska, in the band's sound.

Auktyon's arrangements make extensive use of brass and woodwind instruments, including saxophone, bass clarinet and tuba, alongside guitar, keyboards, bass and percussion. The Boston Globe noted the prominence of low-register horns and described connections between ska and klezmer in the band's music. A 1995 review, the German newspaper taz described the music on the album Ptiza as a combination of Russian folk harmonies, klezmer rhythms and jazz, with predominantly acoustic instrumentation. Reviewing Girls Sing in 2008, the Boston Phoenix highlighted the album's range from noise-influenced cool jazz to acoustic Gypsy folk.

The band's musical identity is also associated with theatrical performance. A 1989 taz concert review described Auktyon's mixture of jazz, new wave, punk, Russian folk music, modern dance and theatre, while noting the group's costumes and stage antics. Willamette Week likewise characterized the group by its absurdist stage show and musical intensity, while describing its compositions as unconventional, genre-crossing pieces rather than conventional verse-and-chorus songs.

=== Influences ===
Auktyon's musical influences encompassed a wide range of genres, including new wave, post-punk, hard rock, art rock, free jazz and contemporary classical music. In a 2013 interview with Colta, saxophonist Nikolai Rubanov recalled that the Cure and the Police had a particularly strong influence on the band during its early years. He also cited free jazz, Led Zeppelin, art rock and contemporary chamber music among his own musical interests. In a 1989 interview with taz, guitarist Leonid Fyodorov named the Cure among his favourite bands, while guitarist Dmitry Matkovsky cited Talking Heads. The interview also noted that the band's members had diverse musical tastes, including Arabic music and hard rock. In a 1995 interview, Fyodorov identified the Beatles as his most significant musical influence, describing their impact on rock music as particularly transformative. In a 2024 interview, vocalist Oleg Garkusha recalled that the band's early musical environment was strongly influenced by British new wave, mentioning Talking Heads, The Police, The Clash, Bryan Ferry, Bad Manners, and Madness. He also noted similarities between the early music of Auktyon and the Police.

== Band members ==
=== Current members ===
- Leonid Fyodorov — vocals, electric guitar, acoustic guitar, percussion (1978—present)
- Viktor Bondarik — bass (1980–1983, 1985—present)
- Oleg Garkusha — vocals, dance, declamation, show, lyrics (1985—present), sound engineer, lyrics, other (1980–1985)
- Dmitriy Ozersky — keyboards, trumpet, percussion, lyrics (1981—present)
- Nikolay Rubanov — saxophones, bass-clarinet, jaleika, keyboards (1986—present)
- Boris Shaveinikov — drums, percussion (1988—present)
- Mikhail Kolovsky — tuba, trombone (1995—present)
- Vladimir Volkov — double bass, keyboards (2007—present)
- Mikhail Rappoport — sound engineer (1987—present)

=== Former members ===
Блю Бойз/Параграф/Фаэтон (1978–1983)

- Dmitriy Zaychenko — bass, electric organ (1978–1980)
- Aleksey Vikhrev — drums (1978–1980)
- Mikhail Makov — guitar, vocals (1980-?)
- Aleksey Vittel — guitar (1980-?)
- Alexander Pompeev — keyboards (1980–1981)
- Sergey Skvortsov — lighting engineer (1981–1988), director (1987–1988)
- Sergey Melnik — guitar (1981–1983)
- Evgeniy Chumichev — drums (1981–1983)
- Sergey Gubenko — bass (1983)
- Valeriy Nedomovniy — vocals (1983)
- Sergey Lobachev — vocals, guitar (1983)

Аукцион/АукцЫон (1983—present)

- Sergey Skvortsov — lighting engineer (1981–1988), director (1987–1988)
- Evgeniy Chumichev — drums (1981–1983)
- Sergey Gubenko — bass (1983)
- Sergey Lobachev — vocals, guitar (1983)
- Igor Cheridnik — drums (1985–1988)
- Nikolay Fedorovich — saxophone (1985–1987)
- Arkadiy Volk — vocals (1985)
- Sergey Rogozhin — vocals (1985–1987)
- Kirill Miller — visual artist, stage design, costume design, artwork (1985–1992)
- Pavel Litvinov — percussion (1987–2005)
- Igor Skaldin — guitar (1987)
- Dmitriy Matkovsky — guitar (1987–1995)
- Vladimir Vesyolkin — dance, show, vocals (1987–1992)
- Evgeniy Dyatlov — vocals, violin (1988)
- Yuriy Parfyonov — trumpet (2011–2025)

== Discography ==
=== Studio albums ===
Title (Transliterated)	Title (Russian)	Title (English)	Release date
Vernis v Sorrento	Вернись в Сорренто	Return to Sorrento	1986
V Bagdade vse spokoyno	В Багдаде все спокойно	All Quiet in Baghdad	1989
Kak ya stal predatelem	Как я стал предателем	How I Became a Traitor	1989
Zhopa	Жопа	Asshole	1990
Bodun	Бодун	Hangover	1991
Ptitsa	Птица	Bird	1994
Eto Mama	Это мама	It's Mum	2002
Devushki Poyut	Девушки поют	Girls Sing	2007
Yula	Юла	Spinning Top	2011
Na solntse	На Солнце	On the Sun	2016
Mechty	Мечты	Dreams	2020
Sokrovistche	Сокровище	Treasure	2025

=== Auktyon & Khvost ===
Title (Transliterated)	Title (Russian)	Title (English)	Release date
Chainik Vina	Чайник вина	Teapot of Wine	1992
Zhilets Vershyn	Жилец вершин	Dweller of the Mountains	1996

=== EP ===
Title (Transliterated)	Title (Russian)	Title (English)	Release date
Nebo Napopolam	Небо напополам	The Sky in Half	1999

=== Live albums & compilations ===
Title (Transliterated)	Title (Russian)	Title (English)	Release date
D'Observer	Д'Обсервер	The Observer	1986
Auktsyon	Аукцыон	Auktyon	1995
Pioner	Пионер	Pioneer	2006

== See also ==
- The Road (Doroga)
