= Yelizaveta Osetinskaya =

Russian journalist (born 1977)

- Елизавета Осетинская
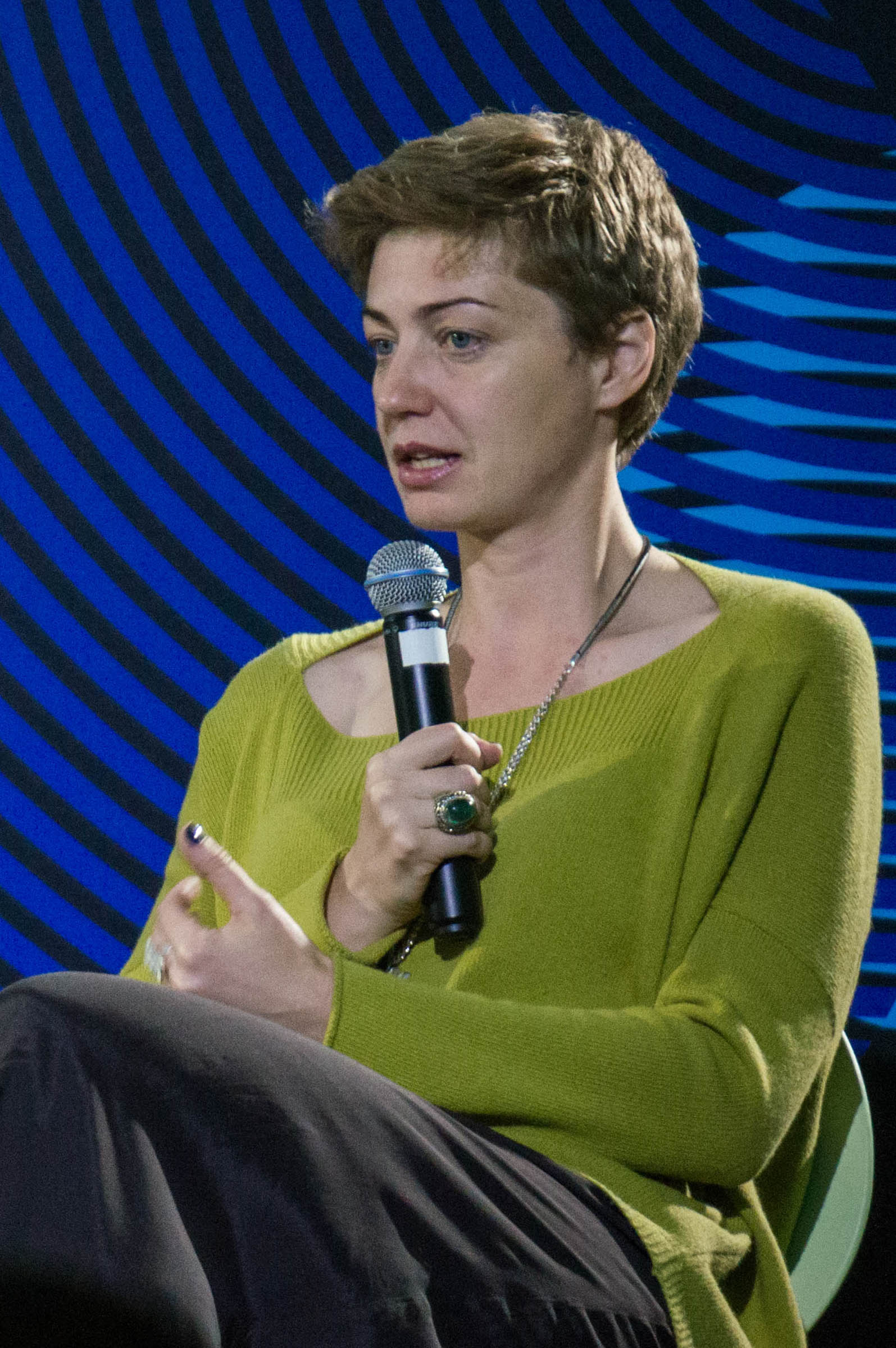
- Born: Yelizaveta Nikolayevna Osetinskaya; May 3, 1977 (age 49); Moscow, Russian SFSR, Soviet Union
- Education: Moscow State University
- Occupations: Russian journalist and media manager
- Yelizaveta Osetinskaya's voice Masyuk on the Echo of Moscow program, 28 December 2013

Yelizaveta Nikolayevna Osetinskaya (Russian: Елизавета Николаевна Осетинская, IPA: [jɪlʲɪzɐˈvʲetə nʲɪkɐˈlajɪvnə ɐsʲɪˈtʲɪnskəjə]; born 3 May 1977, Moscow) is a Russian journalist and media manager. She is notable as a former editor-in-chief of the Russian edition of Forbes (2011–2013) and RBC (2014–2016). Her reforms at RBC helped make it one of the most-cited Russian media holdings. Under her editorship, RBC emphasized investigative journalism, with highlights including the participation of Russian troops in the War in Donbas and the business connections of president Vladimir Putin's family.

== Biography ==
=== Family and early years ===
Osetinskaya was born in Moscow in 1977. Her father Nikolay Iosifovich Osetinskiy was a professor in the Gubkin Russian State University of Oil and Gas. She graduated from Moscow public school №1543 in 1994.

Osetinskaya is an alumna of the MSU Faculty of Economics, graduating in 1998. During her students years, in 1995 she started reporting for RBC.

=== Career ===
Between November 1999 and April 2011 Osetinskaya worked for Vedomosti. She started as a correspondent and gradually rose to editor-in-chief position. In 2005 she obtained an MBA in a joint program of RANEPA and the Kingston University; in the same year she started as a radio host on ‘Echo of Moscow’.

In 2009 Vedomosti had a conflict with Oleg Deripaska's Rusal. The newspaper published data on $5.98 billion losses of Rusal in 2008 and $720 million losses in the first six months of 2009. Rusal lawyers accused the newspaper for disclosing business secrets and demanded to reveal the sources, despite prohibition of such revealing enshrined in state Media Law. The company also tried to forbid Vedomosti to publish any news on its account. Osetinskaya spoke out publicly and condemned the intimidation of the journalists. Due to her positions, the Media Workers Union wrote an open letter to Deripaska, demanding to end pressure on the media. Later on, Vedomisti continued to write about Deripaska's companies and Rusal.

Between May 2011 and December 2013, Osetinskaya was the editor-in-chief of the Russian edition of Forbes.

In January 2014 she started as the editor-in-chief of business-news conglomerate RBC, which included the television network, the website, the daily newspaper, and the magazine.

On 13 May 2016, together with two more editors of the RBC Information Systems, she was fired with immediate effect. It is believed that this was a consequence of the publication about the Panama Papers and their connections to Vladimir Putin. Earlier that year, she was named a 2016–17 International John S. Knight Journalism Fellow at Stanford University. In the same year, she also received a scholarship to the Investigative Reporting Program at the University of California, Berkeley. After graduation, she returned to Russia and launched The Bell, a six-person media start-up, independent of oligarch or state money.

In December 2017, Osetinskaya launched her own Youtube show ‘Russkie Norm’ (trans. ‘Russians are Okay’) where she interviewed successful Russian scientists and businessmen, living abroad.

In July 2020, she signed a letter in support of journalist Ivan Safronov Jr., who was accused for state treason by the Russian authorities.

== Crackdown ==
Osetinskaya condemned the 2022 Russian invasion of Ukraine. She also stopped releasing her ‘Russkie Norm’ show, explaining that ‘now it would be cynical to speak about talents, business and development’. Instead, she started a series of interviews with political analysts, economists and other experts, trying to analyze Russia's future in economics. On April 1, 2022, she was declared foreign agent by the Russian Ministry of Justice.
