= Zhopa =

- Cover artwork for the 1992 reissue

Studio album by Auktyon
- Released: 1990, 1992
- Recorded: 1990
- Genres: Jazz rock, psychedelic rock
- Length: 54:55 (42:56)
- Labels: ЭРИО, Апрель, BSA Records

Auktyon chronology
Kak ya stal predatelem (1989)	Zhopa (1990)	Bodun (1991)

Zhopa (Russian: Жопа, literally: arse) is a studio album by Auktyon, recorded in 1990.

== Composition ==
Soviet and Russian journalist Andrey Burlaka described Zhopa and the follow-up release Bodun (1991) as mid-tempo, filled with detailed instrumental solos as well as counterpoints between guitar, keys, and wind instruments.

== Release and reception ==
In 1990, the album was released in a truncated form and was called Duplo (hollow). It got its current name in the 1992 CD reissue of this album. The album was named after the body-part that Auktyon dancer Vladimir Veselkin displayed regularly during performances by the band during their 1989 overseas tour which received media attention within the USSR. On December 30, 2011, it was reissued with bonuses: recordings of Auktyon's performances at the Theater on Fontanka (01/20/1990) and in Togliatti (09/08/1990), at the VIII Leningrad Rock Festival (03/12/1991) and the Rock of Pure Water festival in Volgograd (05/22/1990).

As in previous albums, the songwriter was Leonid Fyodorov. The authorship of the lyrics belongs to Oleg Garkusha (except for the song "Yabeda" - its text was written by Dmitry Ozersky).

== Tracklist ==
=== Original 1990 vinyl issue ===
1. Pioneer (05:12)
2. Nemoi (05:19)
3. Boyus' (05:56)
4. Yabeda (04:33)
5. Samolyot (06:14)
6. Lyobov' (05:54)
7. Vru (05:33)
8. Ubyut (04:20)

=== 1992 CD reissue ===
1. Kolpak (06:00)
2. Nemoi (05:23)
3. Pioneer (05:27)
4. Boyus' (06:01)
5. Yabeda (04:38)
6. Samolyot (06:19)
7. Lyubov' (06:03)
8. Vru (05:36)
9. Vyzhit' (05:03)
10. Ubyut (04:27)
