= RBK Daily =

Russian newspaper

RBK Daily (Russian: РБК daily) is a general business newspaper published in Moscow, Russia.

== History and profile ==
RBK Daily was started in October 2006. The paper is part of RosBusinessConsulting and is published by the company in cooperation with the German publishing group Handelsblatt. The daily has its headquarters in Moscow.

RBK Daily is published full-color unlike most of newspapers published in Russia and other business papers.
