= RBC-Ukraine =

Ukrainian news agency

- Native name: РБК-Україна
- Type: News agency
- Industry: Media
- Founded: 2006
- Founder: Yosyp Pintus
- Headquarters: Kyiv, Ukraine
- Key people: Yosyp Pintus
- Products: News; Analytics; Entertainment
- Owner: LLC "UBT"

RBC-Ukraine (Ukrainian: РБК-Україна, romanized: RBK-Ukraina) is a Ukrainian news agency. Founded in 2006 as a division of the Russian media holding RBK Group (short for RosBusinessConsulting), it became independent of its Russian holding company in 2010 and, in 2015, it came under complete control of the Ukrainian media businessman Yosyp Pintus. On January 29, 2016, the Russian holding "RBC" tried to challenge the use of the "RBC" brand in court, and lost the case.

Since April 2014, IARBC-Ukrain has positioned itself as an independent company with no relation to the Russian structure. From 1 August to June 2017, RBC-Ukraine was managed by Valeriy Kalnysh, the former chief editor of Radio Vesti and the magazine Kommersant Ukraine. From July 2017 to 2022, the chief editor was Serhiy Shcherbyna.

== Company overview ==
RBC-Ukraine is a Ukrainian information portal specializing in financial, economic, and political news of Ukraine and the world. "RBC-Ukraine" was created in 2006 as the Ukrainian division of the Russian information agency RosBusinessConsulting (RBC). The owner of the Ukrainian unit is Yosyp Pintus, a cousin of RosBusinessConsulting beneficiary Herman Kaplun.

== History ==
In the first months of 2006, only the Russian version of the site existed, but in the second half of 2006, a full-fledged Ukrainian version was launched. Among the main platforms included in the portal are the informational-analytical website "RBC-Ukraine", the online publication Worldnewsage.com (formerly Utro.ua), the informational-entertainment site "Styler" (news about culture, fashion, health, technology, and cars) and the English-language publication NewsUkraine.rbc.ua. From 2006 to 2008, the media director was journalist and media manager Roman Skrypin. In September 2016, the site was updated. In particular, the "Daily" module was added, which allows viewing the news feed without switching between pages ("infinite scrolling"). The updated site was divided into News, Daily, and Styler. In 2018, the "Lite" section was created on the site, specializing in news about celebrities, beauty, and fashion.

== Ownership ==
Initially, the agency "RBC-Ukraine" was owned by the Russian company "RosBusinessConsulting" through LLC "RBC-Ukraine". In April 2015, the official website of the Ukrainian agency partially removed the information that the "agency was created with the support of the RBC group of companies". In July 2016, the information was completely removed. In April 2014, it was announced that the agency had separated from the Russian RBC and has since been legally independent. As of April 2015, the founder of the information agency "RBC-Ukraine" (certificate No. 402—264 PR from April 6, 2015) became the Ukrainian company "UBT", owned by Yosyp Pintus who was involved in the creation of the agency "RBC-Ukraine" from the very beginning.

Since 2015, LLC "RBC-Ukraine" has no relation to the agency. In 2015, employees of the SBU demanded a copy of the registration of the agency "RBC-Ukraine" in Ukraine, as in February of that year, the VRU adopted resolution No. 1853 on the temporary suspension of accreditation of journalists and technical workers of some Russian media at the bodies of state power in Ukraine. Most major Ukrainian online media are owned by oligarchs and, in one way or another, reflect the necessary point of view. RBC-Ukraine is the only one of the five most popular Ukrainian online media owned by a media businessman — Yosyp Pintus.

== Ratings ==
=== Audience ===
According to the service Socialbakers, the information portal "RBC-Ukraine" in February 2020 ranked first in the number of subscribers on Facebook with an audience of 1.75 million readers. the Ukrainian-language — almost 440 thousand readers. The Styler division had 883 thousand subscribers, in total "RBC-Ukraine" has an audience of over 3 million readers in social networks, ranking first in the rating of Ukrainian social media by the number of subscribers. Since the beginning of 2020, the RBC-Ukraine site has ranked first in terms of visits among Ukrainian media.

=== Quality ===
In September 2020, VOXUkraine analyzed 14,000 news stories from 26 major Ukrainian internet media. Materials from the sites of RBC-Ukraine and Interfax-Ukraine were recognized as the most cited among other media. According to a study by the Institute of Mass Information in March 2021, 92% of the publication's materials did not violate professional standards. The resource was found to contain materials with signs of commissioned content with possible violations of balance, but no violations of the standard of accuracy and separation of facts from comments were found. In December 2020, the Commission on Journalistic Ethics assessed materials from RBC-Ukraine from November 30 and December 10 regarding the quality of transportation by the operator Join UP. According to the commission, standards of information objectivity, balance of viewpoints, and separation of judgments and assumptions were violated. The publication stated its readiness to publish the company's position, but the operator did not provide such data. The commission recognized the readiness to publish all opinions as appropriate for achieving balance.

== Divisions ==
After the site update in September 2016, the main sections of the site are:

- "News" — a news feed about Ukraine (in Ukrainian or Russian).
- "Daily" — a continuous news feed about Ukraine (in Ukrainian or Russian).
- "Styler" — news within the sphere of society, culture, health, technology, and cars related to Ukraine. The section was created in 2015 as a Russian-language informational and entertainment site, and after updates in September 2016, a Ukrainian-language interface also appeared (in Ukrainian or Russian).
- "Lite" — news about celebrities, beauty, and fashion.
- "Market Research" (English: RBC-Ukraine "Market Research") — marketing research of the Ukrainian markets (in Russian).
- "Travel" — a project dedicated to travel and leisure. The main focus is on how to organize your vacation comfortably, affordably, and safely.
- "Realty" — a project dedicated to the real estate market in Ukraine and the world. The project's goal is to promote the development of the real estate market in Ukraine, with a primary focus in publications on how to choose reliable and comfortable housing, as well as how to invest profitably in the real estate market.

== Management ==
- CEO: Yosyp Pintus.
- Deputy Directors: Volodymyr Shultz, Svitlana Sheremetyeva-Turchyn.
- Commercial Director: Dmytro Protsenko

== Editorial ==
- Editor-in-Chief: Rostyslav Shapravskyi (since 2022), who previously worked as the first deputy editor-in-chief.

Previous editors-in-chief included:

- Danylo Kyryakov (2006–2009)
- Anton Pidlutskyi (2009–2015)
- Denys Bezliudko (2015–2016)
- Valeriy Kalnysh (2016–2017)
- Serhiy Shcherbyna (from August 2017 to 2022).

From 2006 to 2008, the media director of "RBC-Ukraine" was Roman Skrypin. In August, by mutual agreement, he left the company, and according to the CEO of "RBC-Ukraine" Yosyp Pintus, the position of media director was eliminated.

== Blocking in Russia ==
On 29 January 2016, the Russian Roskomnadzor blocked the RBC-Ukraine site within the territory of the Russian Federation for "extremist materials", commenting it as "with Bandera supporters, we have a short conversation".
