= RBK Group =

Russian media group

RBC Group
- Native name: РосБизнесКонсалтинг
- Traded as: MCX: RBCM
- Genre: Media group
- Founded: Moscow, Russia (1993)
- Headquarters: Moscow, Russia
- Key people: Nikolay Molibog, Director-general
- Services: Informational agency, news web portal, business newspaper, business magazine, business television
- Revenue: $92 million (2016)
- Operating income: $26.5 million (2016)(2016)
- Net income: $14.4 million (2016)
- Owner: Grigoriy Beryozkin
- Number of employees: 1500
- Website: www.rbc.ru

The RBC Group, or RosBusinessConsulting (Note: Russian: Группа компаний «РБК» РБК, РосБизнесКонсалтинг; Scientific: Gruppa kompanij "RBK" RBK, RosBiznesKonsalting; BGN/PCGN: Gruppa kompaniy "RBK" RBK, RosBiznesKonsalting), is a Russian media group headquartered in Moscow. It was established in 1993.

The company holds an informational agency RosBusinessConsulting, including a news web-portal, business newspaper RBK Daily, monthly business magazine RBC, and RBC TV. Capitalization on MOEX is $44.13 million (as of 10 March 2018).

== History ==
RBC was recognized in Russia for investigative journalism, including reports on corruption and abuse of power which led to a forced change of leadership, including the editor-in-chief Yelizaveta Osetinskaya, in May 2016. In April 2016, searches were conducted at the ONEKSIM Group investment fund, controlling shareholder of the RBC Group, due to publications about Vladimir Putin's daughter Katerina Tikhonova and her husband, Russian oligarch Kirill Shamalov, as well as about the Panama Papers. The Moscow Times reported that the 11 May 2016 RBC article "Oyster farming will begin in front of "Putin's palace" near Gelendzhik" (Russian: Напротив «дворца Путина» под Геленджиком начнут разводить устриц) revealed that Alexander Ponomarenko is the owner of "Putin's Palace". After publication of the RBC article, Mikhail Prokhorov, who has had the majority ownership of the RBK Group since he purchased a 51% stake in it in 2009, fired Maxim Solus, the editor-in-chief of RBC newspaper. Both Roman Badanin, rbc.ru's chief editor, and Yelizaveta Osetinskaya, RBC's chief editor, resigned in response.

In 2019, British newspaper The Guardian claimed that RBK, along with Kommersant and Vedomosti, were some of the most respected Russian newspapers.

In September 2021, RBK Group sold 100% of the shares of Ru-Center Group, the domain names registrar, to the syndicate of private investors, Ru-Web.Investments LLC, led by Proxima Capital Group (founded in 2013 by Vladimir Tatarchuk, ex-Alfa-Bank). Under the terms of the deal RBK Group acquired a 25% stake in Ru-Web.Investments LLC.

== Structure of company ==
In 2015 RBK Holding introduced a new business structure that divided assets into 5 segments, such a structure existed almost until the end of 2020:

- "B2C information and services" (projects based on the advertising model: portal, newspaper, magazine, RBK-TV, thematic sites "RBK Real Estate", Autonews, "RBK Style", "RBK Sport", "RBK Quote", "RBK Trends),
- "B2B information and services" (projects with paid access to content: "RBK Researches", "RBK Conferences", information service "RBK Pro", Public.ru, rating agency "National credit ratings"),
- "B2B infrastructure" (hosting business and domain name registration),
- "Inspiration from RBK" (RBK Award),
- "Secondary assets" (dating site LovePlanet.ru).

At the moment there are three segments:

- "Media / information and services"
- "Digital-infrastructure"
- "Secondary assets"

=== Media projects ===
The segment presents RBK media projects that work according to the advertising model: sites rbc.ru (home page and news) and pro.rbc.ru (limited functionality without registration; the first 30 days are free), RBK newspaper (formerly RBK Daily), RBK magazine, RBK TV channel, thematic projects "RBK Real Estate" (publication about the real estate market), "RBK Sport" (sports edition), Autonews (publication about cars), "RBK Style" (lifestyle edition), "RBK Investments" (publication about finance and service for investors), "RBK Trends" (publication about trends in economics, business, technology and society).

The "RBK Real Estate" service included a real estate listing board. In 2016 as part of the relaunch of the project, the project's own database of objects was transferred to the «Yandex.Real Estate», and that is integrated into the RBK thematic platform.

In 2019 "RBK Quote" («RBK Investments») was relaunched in partnership with VTB Bank in the format of media about finance and a platform for investing in securities. As part of Autonews, a car service selection service has been operating since 2019.

=== Services ===
In addition to media content, RBK's thematic projects include additional tools and services. This also includes projects aimed at corporate clients and working on a paid access model. Among the assets of «RBK Market Research» (ready-made studies of economic sectors prepared by specialists of RBK and partner companies), «RBK Conferences» (organization and media support of events). The online database of Russian media acquired in 2014 Public.ru (monitoring, analytics and research based on media materials) and the information and analytical platform «RBK Pro».

In 2019 RBK established its own credit rating agency, «National Credit Ratings» (NCR), which was headed by Kirill Lukashuk, former director of the Analytical Credit Agency (ACRA). In September the NKR received accreditation from the Central Bank and became one of the 4 Russian rating agencies authorized to officially assign credit ratings.

In July 2020 RBK acquired 25% in the Scoring Technologies company, which develops the Rescore counterparty verification service. The service uses artificial intelligence for in-depth verification of counterparties and risk assessment (for example the probability of bankruptcy).

=== Regional versions ===
Since 2012 RBK has been launching regional versions rbc.ru. The first was its own regional version, which was launched in St. Petersburg in 2012, and later RBK's regional sites were launched under a franchise. For 2020 the following regional versions of RBK worked: "RBK St. Petersburg and the Region", "RBK-Yekaterinburg", "RBK-Novosibirsk", "RBK-Bashkortostan", "RBK-Vologda Region", "RBK-Kaliningrad", "RBK-Krasnodarskiy kray", "RBK-Nizhny", "RBK-Perm Krai", "RBK-Rostov-on-Don", "RBK-Tatarstan", "RBK-Tyumen", "RBK-Chernozemye", "RBK-Caucasus". The holders of the RBK franchise are mainly regional media companies, entrepreneurs with experience in launching Internet projects and traditional media, managing advertising agencies, and former media editors.

Regional versions of the RBK portal have a second-level domain, to which some visitors to the main site are redirected via geolocation. The holders of the RBK franchise use the federal news agency's feed and publish local content prepared in accordance with the dogma of RBK (professional and ethical principles of the publication). Compliance with the standards is monitored by a separate editorial office of the regional RBK tapes, located in St. Petersburg. Since the information background in the regions is different, the local versions of RBK have some differences. Thus, RBK-Kaliningrad is more focused on the business topic, RBK-Ufa produces more interviews and large analytics formats, RBK-Tatarstan content contains more materials about petrochemistry and oil refining, the banking sector.

The holders of the RBK franchise earn money by selling advertising, the placement of which is administered by the Moscow office of the holding. As part of the contract, franchisees pay royalties to the federal RBK, the amount of which depends on the advertising capacity of the region. In 2017 the amount of royalties reached from a third to half of the franchisee's expenses.

=== In Ukraine ===
In 2006 the holding started a branch in Ukraine called RBC-Ukraine. In 2010 it handed this project over to Ukrainian businessman Yosyp Pintus for an undisclosed but alleged "symbolic sum". In 2012 Pintus stated that RBC-Ukraine was an independent company that had no ties (anymore) to the (Russian) RBK Group. In 2016 the Russian holding tried to challenge the use of the "RBC" brand in Ukraine in court, but lost the case.

=== RBK Award ===
The holding has been awarding the RBK Award since 2014. Previously it was 5 awards at once: «People's Brand No.1», «Company of the Year», «Person of the Year», «Financial Olympus» and «Brand of the Year/Effie». The holding sold the rights to the first four to its former shareholders Herman Kaplun and Alexander Morgulchik in September 2014, the latter became independent from RBK in 2016. The unified RBK Award was first awarded in December 2014, and the regional RBK Petersburg Award in 2015. The award is presented in three categories: «People», «Companies» and «Society».

=== Digital-infrastructure ===
Infrastructure projects include RBK's business related to hosting and domain name registration. RBK is the largest participant in the Russian market of hosting and domain registration services. Its subsidiary holding Hosting Community was formed in 2007, when the company consolidated the acquired Hosting Center, SpaceWeb, PeterHost, Garant Park Telecom and Centrohost. The Group of companies has become the largest participant in the Russian hosting market with a 20% share and the second largest domain name registrar after Ru-Center. In 2011 RBK acquired Ru-Center for almost 0.9 billion rubles, which made Hosting Community the largest company in Eastern Europe in both areas. After the acquisition of the Reggae Business hoster and registrar in 2013, the Hosting Community accounted for 48.6% of the domains in the .ru zone, 54.6% in the .рф zone, 64.09 % in the zone .su, and the share in the Russian hosting market reached 27.4%. In early 2014 Hosting Community changed its name to Ru-Center Group as it is more recognizable in the b2c market.

In September 2021 RBK Group sold 100% of the shares of Ru-Center Group LLC, which owns the hosting provider and domain name registrar Ru-Center, to "Ru-Web. Investments" LLC, which unites private investors led by Proxima Capital Group, founded by Vladimir Tatarchuk, ex-deputy chairman of Alfa Bank. As a result of the transaction, RBK received 25% in the "Ru-Web. Investments" company.

=== Secondary assets ===
The "Secondary assets" segment includes projects that are not related to the main business of the holding, but are developing with its support. For 2019 the main project of this direction was the Internet dating service LovePlanet.ru. RBK acquired the service during a period of growth in 2007. In 2013 RBK considered the possibility of selling LovePlanet.ru as a non-core asset within the framework of the new strategy. However, unlike other entertainment projects that served to attract traffic to business publications, LovePlanet.ru was profitable, and in 2014 the management of RBK abandoned the idea of selling the service. Previously the same segment included a publication about Cnews technologies, RBK in 2018 sold the media to its editor Maksim Kazak and CEO Eduard Ercole.

== Resonant events ==
In the spring of 2015 Anonymous International made publicly available an array of electronic correspondence between officials of the presidential administration. Among the letters, correspondence between Administration of the Russian Federation President (AP) employee Timur Prokopenko and RBK CEO Nikolai Molibog and journalist Mikhail Rubin was discovered. Molibog confirmed that he had communicated with the state to explain the essence of the large-scale changes in RBK, but noted that the AP does not affect publications in any way. It followed from the correspondence between Rubin and Prokopenko that in some cases the journalist allowed the manager to interfere with his materials. After the publication of this correspondence, the editor-in-chief of RBK promised that the publication would conduct an internal investigation into Rubin's violation of editorial rules and take appropriate measures.

In 2016 Rosneft filed a lawsuit against RBK, journalists Timofey Dzyadko, Lyudmila Podobedova, Maxim Tovkailo and RBK-TV presenter Konstantin Bochkarev. The state corporation did not like the April publication «Sechin asked the government to protect Rosneft from BP,» where, citing government sources, it was reported that Igor Sechin was afraid of increasing BP's share in Rosneft and asked to limit the range of possible purchasers of shares during privatization (in fact, acting against the interests of shareholders). First Rosneft demanded a refutation, and then additionally presented material claims in the amount of 3 billion rubles — the representative of the state-owned company did not hide during the court session that the amount of compensation was due to the desire to «punish» RBK. On December 12, 2016 the court of first instance ruled that RBK journalists could not prove the authenticity of the published information and ordered the media holding to publish a refutation, but reduced the amount of compensation to 390 thousand rubles. Rosneft challenged the decision, considering the amount of compensation «ridiculous», and RBK also appealed, demanding that the claim be dismissed in full. On March 1, 2018 the Court of Appeal overturned the decision to award compensation, but upheld the requirement to refute the information on the air of RBK-TV. In June 2017 RBK and Rosneft signed a settlement agreement.

In March 2018 the management of RBK recalled from the State Duma all journalists involved in materials for the website, magazine, newspaper and TV channel as a sign of disagreement with the decision of the Duma Ethics Commission, which found no evidence of sexual harassment of journalists by the head of the Duma Committee on International Affairs Leonid Slutsky.

In June 2019 RBK, Kommersant and Vedomosti for the first time in their history came out with the front page in a single style — the inscription «I / We Ivan Golunov». The design was developed by Saint and Anastasia Vishnyakov at the initiative of RBC. The editorial offices also issued a joint statement in support of the arrested Meduza journalist Ivan Golunov. This phrase became the main symbol of the campaign against Golunov's persecution, and after the journalist's release, its variations began to be used as a universal symbol of solidarity in the fight against injustice (and also became the basis for many Internet memes).

In March 2020 Rosneft filed another claim against RBK for damages in the amount of 43 billion rubles due to the article «Ryazan PSC received a share in the former Venezuelan Rosneft project», dedicated to the transfer of Roszarubezhneft through a technical intermediary represented by the private security company RN-Okhrana-Ryazan. Rosneft considered that RBK deliberately distorted the essence of the transaction, creating the impression of its imaginary nature, and also linked the subsequent wave of reprints by other media with a decrease in Rosneft's capitalization. Following the negotiations in July, the editorial board of RBK publicly expressed regret that the title of the article could cause incorrect interpretations, and Rosneft withdrew its claims against the holding.

On October 21, 2021 the head of the Spartak football club fan club, Valentin Korshunov, beat up RBK journalist Alexander Shchegolev after a Europa League match. After the incident Korshunov was detained. The Investigative Committee opened a criminal case against Korshunov under article 144 of the Criminal Code of the Russian Federation ("Obstruction of the legitimate activities of a journalist").

== Awards ==
- RBK has repeatedly won the Runet Prize. In 2004 RBK received an award in the Runet Media nomination for «contribution to the development of the Russian segment of the Internet». In 2005 RBK and the Cnews technology publication, which was part of the holding, became laureates of the Runet Prize in the «Technology and Innovation» nomination, and in 2007 — in the «Economics and Business» nomination.
- In 2019 RBK TV channel received a special prize «TEFI-Capital» for television works on economics and business.
- RBK journalists and editorial materials have also been repeatedly awarded professional awards. So, in September 2008, the article «Empty States: how many companies in Russia without employees», which was worked on by Dada Lindell, Anton Feinberg, Yulia Lymar and Ekaterina Kopalkina, won the BudgetApps competition organized by the Ministry of Finance of Russia in the nomination «The best media material created using open government financial data». Denis Puzyrev with the material «Time is money: how the underground business of selling expensive watches worked» (2016), Ilya Rozhestvensky and Mikhail Rubin with the article «The Awakening of the Force: who is behind the high-profile FSB special operations» (2016), Polina Rusyaeva and Andrey Zakharov with the publications «In the depths of the troll factory, Russia's largest media holding has grown» and «RBK Investigation: how the Troll Factory worked in the US elections» (2017) became laureates of the professional «Redkollegia» award.
- In 2019 RBK CEO Nikolai Molibog took the first place among senior executives in the media business in the ranking of the 1000 best managers in Russia compiled by Kommersant Publishing House and the Association of Managers of Russia. Also in different years the head of the RBK TV channel Ilya Doronov, Lyudmila Gurey (2nd place in the rating of commercial directors in the media business), Igor Selivanov (2nd place in the rating of financial directors in the media business), Director of legal affairs Timofey Shcherbakov were noted in the rating.
- In 2018 RBK topped the Russian rating of intellectual companies compiled by the international consulting agency Baker Tilly based on an assessment of the share of intellectual capital in the company's total assets. RBC was ahead of Yandex with an indicator of 81% (vs. 62%), Mail.Ru Group (46%) and other technology and traditional companies.
