= Kuvaev =

Kuvaev or Kuvayev, Kuvaiev (Russian: Кува́ев) and Kuvaeva or Kuvayeva, Kuvaieva (Кува́ева; feminine) is a Russian surname. Notable people with the surname include:

- Andrey Kuvaev (born 1983), Russian Paralympic footballer
- Leo Kuvayev (born 1972), Russian computer criminal
- Oleg Kuvaev (born 1967), Russian-Israeli animator and the creator of Masyanya
- Sergey Kuvaev (born 1984), Russian actor, model, and videoblogger in Japan
- Denis Kuvayev - Variations: Denys Kuvaiev, DenKuvaiev, Denis Kuvaiev (born 1971), Russian - Spanish - French recognized contemporary artist
- Maria Kuvaieva - (born 2006), global special needs ambassador and world-famous photo model with Down syndrome
