= Russian 2022 war censorship laws =

Group of Russian federal laws

2022 war censorship laws

Federal Assembly
- Long title: On Amendments to the Criminal Code of the Russian Federation and Articles 31 and 151 of the Criminal Procedure Code of the Russian Federation
- Territorial extent: Russia
- Signed by: President Vladimir Putin
- Signed: 4 March 2022
- Commenced: 4 March 2022

Legislative history
- First reading: 4 March 2022 (State Duma)
- Second reading: 4 March 2022 (Federation Council)

Amends
- Criminal Code of Russia; Code of the Russian Federation on Administrative Offenses
- Status: Current legislation

On Amendments to the Criminal Code of the Russian Federation and Articles 31 and 151 of the Criminal Procedure Code of the Russian Federation are a group of federal laws promulgated by the Russian government during the Russo-Ukrainian war. These laws establish administrative and criminal punishments for "discrediting" or dissemination of "unreliable information" about the Russian Armed Forces, other Russian state bodies and their operations, and the activity of volunteers aiding the Russian Armed Forces, and for calls to impose sanctions against Russia, Russian organizations and citizens. These laws are an extension of Russian fake news laws and are sometimes referred to as the "fakes" laws.

The laws have been strongly condemned by the political opposition and by human rights groups. The adoption of these laws resulted in the mass exodus of foreign media from Russia and the termination of war reporting by independent Russian media. More than 10,000 people have been prosecuted under these laws, though the laws have been applied inconsistently, with ultra-nationalists and pro-war activists avoiding prosecution despite publishing critical material.

Initially, when enacted on 4 March 2022, the laws applied only to "discrediting" or disseminating "unreliable" information about the Russian Armed Forces. The scope of the law has expanded twice: on 25 March when punishments were added for "discrediting" Russian state bodies or disseminating "unreliable" information about the exercise of their powers outside Russian territory, and on 18 March 2023 when punishments were added for "discrediting" or disseminating "unreliable" information regarding volunteer groups aiding the Russian Armed Forces.

== Overview ==
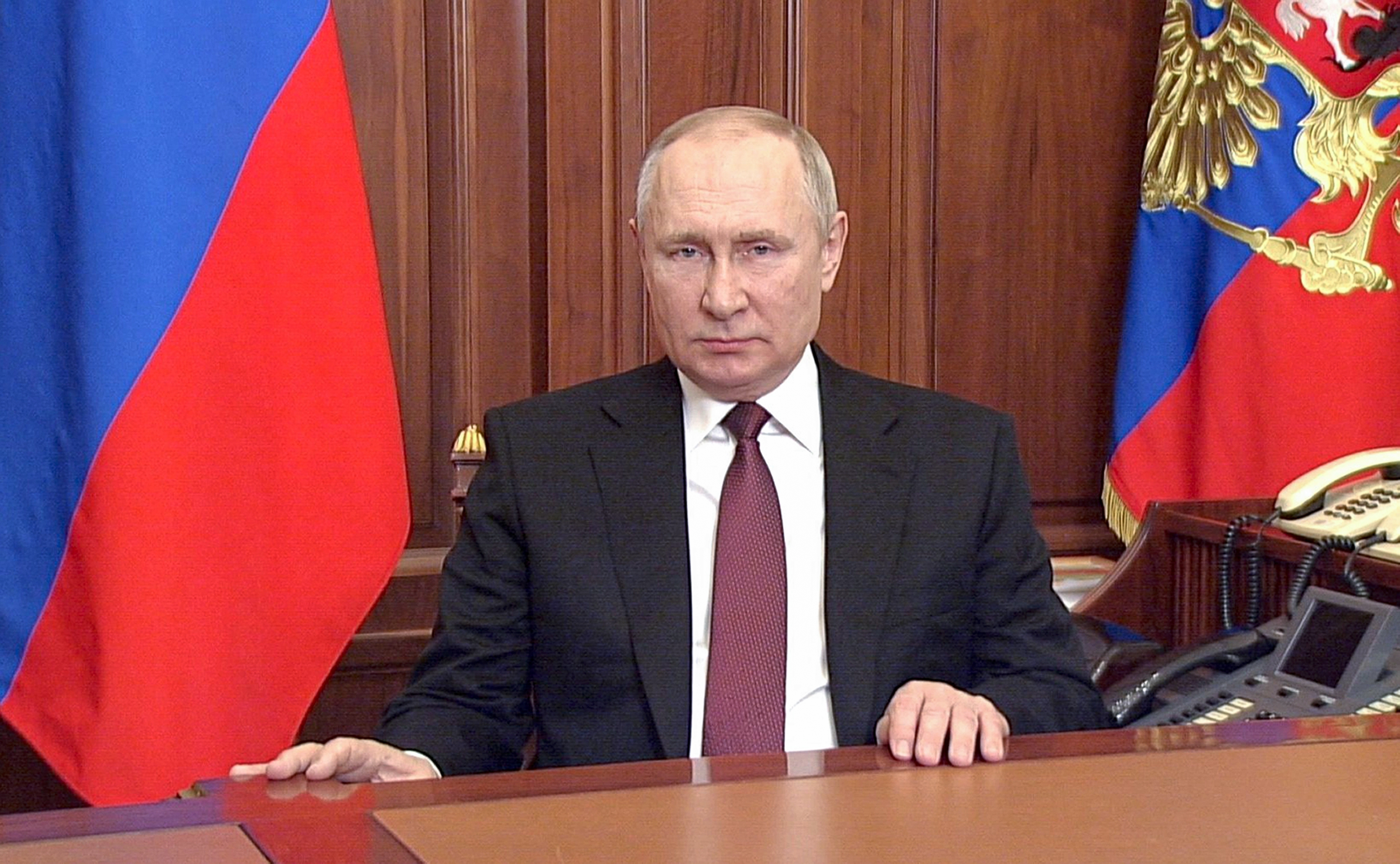
Russian President Vladimir Putin, who signed the law on 4 March 2022

On 4 March 2022, Russian Federal Laws No.31-FZ and No.32-FZ were adopted by State Duma, approved by the Federation Council and signed by the President of Russia. The former law supplemented the Code of the Russian Federation on Administrative Offenses with articles 20.3.3 and 20.3.4, while the latter supplemented the Criminal Code of the Russian Federation with articles 207.3, 280.3 and 284.2. These articles set punishments for making statements against the Russian Armed Forces or for calling for sanctions. A "discrediting" of the armed forces, including calls that their use was not in the interests of the Russian Federation, carried large fines for natural and juridicial persons (article 20.3.3) and up to five years imprisonment (article 280.3). The dissemination of "unreliable information" about the armed forces and its operation could be punished with up to fifteen years imprisonment (article 207.3). Calls to impose sanctions against Russia, Russian citizens or Russian legal entities carried a large fine (article 20.3.4) and up to 3 years imprisonment (article 284.2).

The laws are enforced according to the so-called Dadin scheme: a first offense is punished administratively by fines with subsequent offenses punished under the criminal code. Dissemination of "unreliable" information about the armed forces and their operations is an exception, as it is only punishable under the criminal code. The prevailing approach in Russian law-enforcement considers any violations committed through Internet publications as continuing violations; this allows authorities to persecute people for material published before the laws came into effect. The statute of limitations is taken from the time when violating material is removed from the Internet.

On 25 March 2022, federal laws No.62-FZ and No.63-FZ amended articles 20.3.3 and 207.3 to extend the punishments for "discrediting" or disseminating "unreliable" information regarding the extraterritorial exercise of powers by other Russian state bodies. This includes National Guard, Federal Security Service (FSB), Ministry of Emergency Situations, General Prosecutor's Office, Investigative Committee, and Ministry of Foreign Affairs.

On 18 March 2023, federal laws No.57-FZ and No.58-FZ made additional amendments to the administrative and criminal codes, extending the punishments for "discrediting" or disseminating "unreliable" information to the activities of volunteers, their formations and organizations aimed at assisting the tasks of the armed forces. This included all participants of military operations for Russia, including military volunteers and mercenaries such as Wagner Group, and is remarkable as mercenarism is fully prohibited and criminally punishable under article 359 of Russia's criminal code. These amendments also increased the maximum prison terms: with up to five years imprisonment for calling for sanctions and up to seven years imprisonment for "discrediting" or disseminating "unreliable" information about the armed forces.

== Effect on media ==
=== Domestic media ===
Many Russian media outlets were forced to stop covering the Russian invasion of Ukraine because of this legislation, including Colta.ru, Snob online magazine, Znak.com, The Bell, and Novaya Gazeta. Independent television channel Dozhd (TV Rain) suspended operations due to the laws. Radio Liberty announced that it would stop working in Russia due to the new law on "fakes", but would continue to cover events in Ukraine while abroad. Certain foreign media outlets were also blocked within Russia. (Note: Including: Bloomberg News, CNN, NBC, CBS, ABC, BBC News, Deutsche Welle, RTVE, EFE, RAI, TG5, and ANSA.)

According to news website Agentstvo, over 150 journalists had left Russia by 7 March 2022, within three days of the laws coming into effect.

On 7 April 2022, to avoid prosecutions under the law, journalists from Novaya Gazeta announced the launch of Novaya Gazeta Europe, with its editor-in-chief, Kirill Martynov, stating that Novaya Gazeta Europe would be independent from Novaya Gazeta "both legally and in practice", with its newsroom consisting of staffers who had left Russia.

Leading speakers of several YouTube video blogs with large audiences have also become defendants in the "law on fakes". In particular, criminal cases were initiated against Maxim Katz of channel "Maxim Katz" and Anastasia Bryukhanova of channel "Objective". The reason was the allegations of the involvement of the Russian military in the deaths of the civilian population in Bucha, Ukraine.

As recently as 30 April 2022, Animators Against War broadcast on YouTube episodes of their campaign against the invasion of Ukraine, although it attempts to fly under the radar. With only a Ukrainian flag and the face of Putin represented pictorially in a two-minute short feature, the impact of these censorship laws is evident.

=== Foreign Russian-language media ===
Israel-based Russian animator Oleg Kuvaev criticised the Russian invasion of Ukraine in episode 160 of his webseries Masyanya. In the episode, Putin is compared to Adolf Hitler and is given a katana, implying that he undertakes seppuku. Roskomnadzor banned the cartoon. Two days after the regulator's ruling, a denial-of-service attack was launched against Kuvaev's websites, though the webseries remained on YouTube.

The following episode explained to children that what they witnessed was not to be spoken aloud for fear of drawing the Russian authorities' anger and lust for administrative violence. The subsequent episode depicted a Chinese attack on Russia with bombs falling on Novgorod, Moscow and Tver. The Chinese attack is motivated by a desire to denazify Russia and recuperate Chinese lands, and observes that Russian is not a real language but rather a derivative of the Ukrainian language. It concludes with a parenthetical observation that "this war" is the shame of Russia and that Russia will as a result suffer damnation for centuries.

== Application of law ==
According to human rights NGO OVD-Info, over 400 people were detained or fined by April 2022 under the laws prohibiting fake information about the military. By May 2022 more than 2,000 people were detained or fined under the laws. As of December 2022, more than 4,000 people had been prosecuted for criticizing the war in Ukraine. Notable individual applications of the law include:

On 16 March 2022, Russian socialite and food blogger Veronika Belotserkovskaya became the first individual charged under the "fakes law".

On 22 March 2022, Russian television journalist Alexander Nevzorov was charged under the law after he published information that Russian forces shelled a maternity hospital in Mariupol. Nevzorov said that Vladimir Putin's "regime is not going to spare anyone, and that any attempts to comprehend the criminal war [in Ukraine] will end in prison."

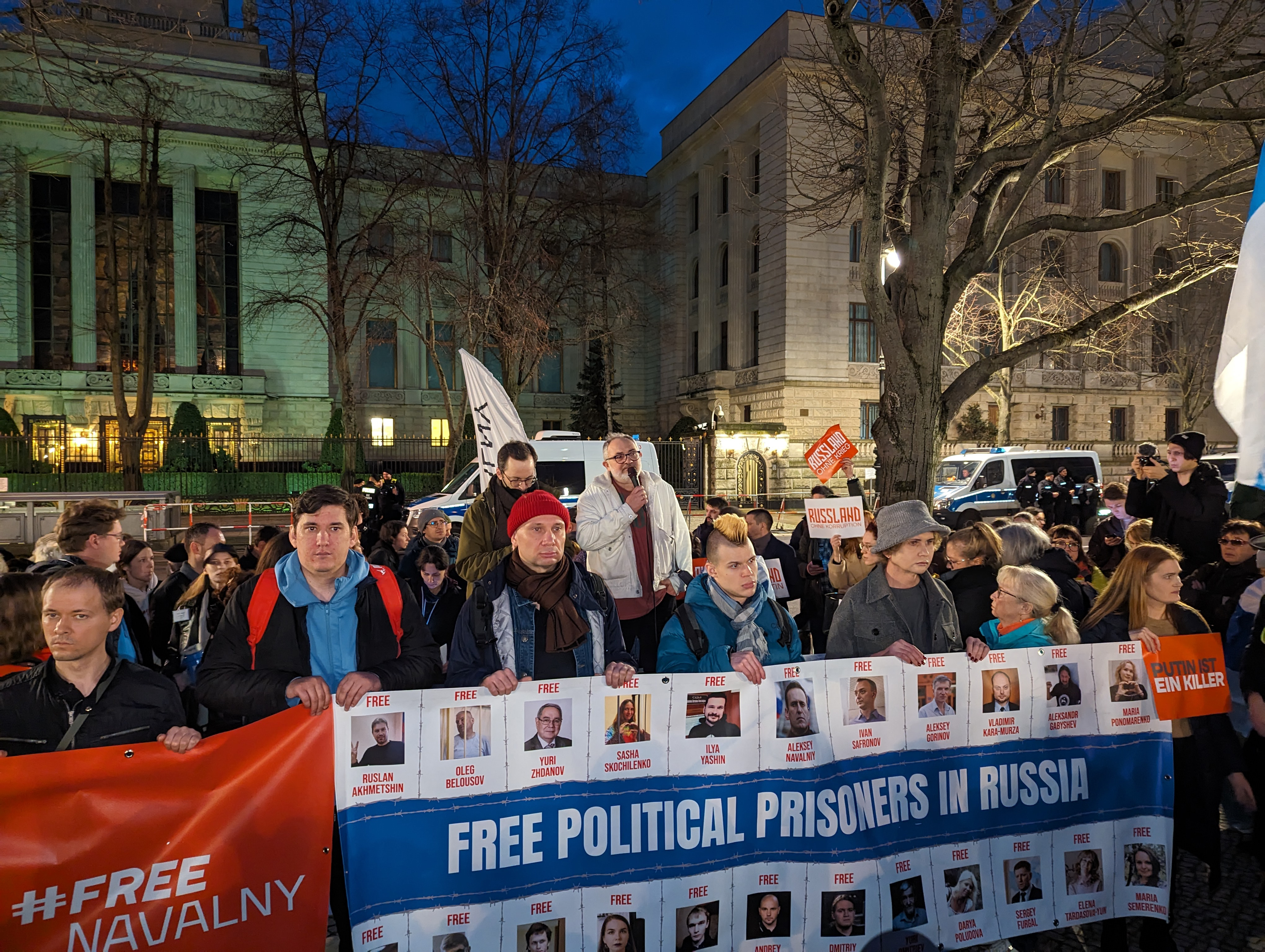
Protest outside the Russian Embassy in Berlin demanding the release of Russia's political prisoners, February 2024

On 25 March 2022, Russian journalist Izabella Yevloyeva was charged under the "fakes law" after sharing a post on social media that described the "Z" symbol as being "synonymous with aggression, death, pain and shameless manipulation".

On 13 April 2022, Russian journalist Mikhail Vyacheslavovich Afanasyev , editor-in-chief of the online magazine Novy Fokus, was detained by police over its reporting on the war in Ukraine. He faces up to 10 years in prison. Afanasyev was twice awarded the Andrei Sakharov Prize "For Journalism as a Deed." He was sentenced to 5.5 years in prison in September 2023.

Sergei Klokov, a Moscow policeman who is originally from Bucha in Ukraine, was arrested after telling co-workers what he had heard from Ukrainian friends and family about the Russian invasion. One of Klokov's colleagues said in the interrogations: "He said that we had no right to attack and go to war with them, and although I tried to explain to him that there is no war, he did not listen to me. I can’t explain why he became so radical."

Some priests in the Russian Orthodox Church have publicly opposed the invasion, with some facing arrest under laws criminalising "discrediting" the armed forces.

On 22 April 2022, Russian opposition politician Vladimir Kara-Murza was charged by a Russian court for spreading of false information about the Russian military, due to his 15 March speech to the Arizona House of Representatives, in which he denounced the war in Ukraine.

Russian journalist Ilya Krasilshchik, the former publisher of Meduza news website, was charged by a Russian court for spreading fake news about the massacre in the Ukrainian city of Bucha.

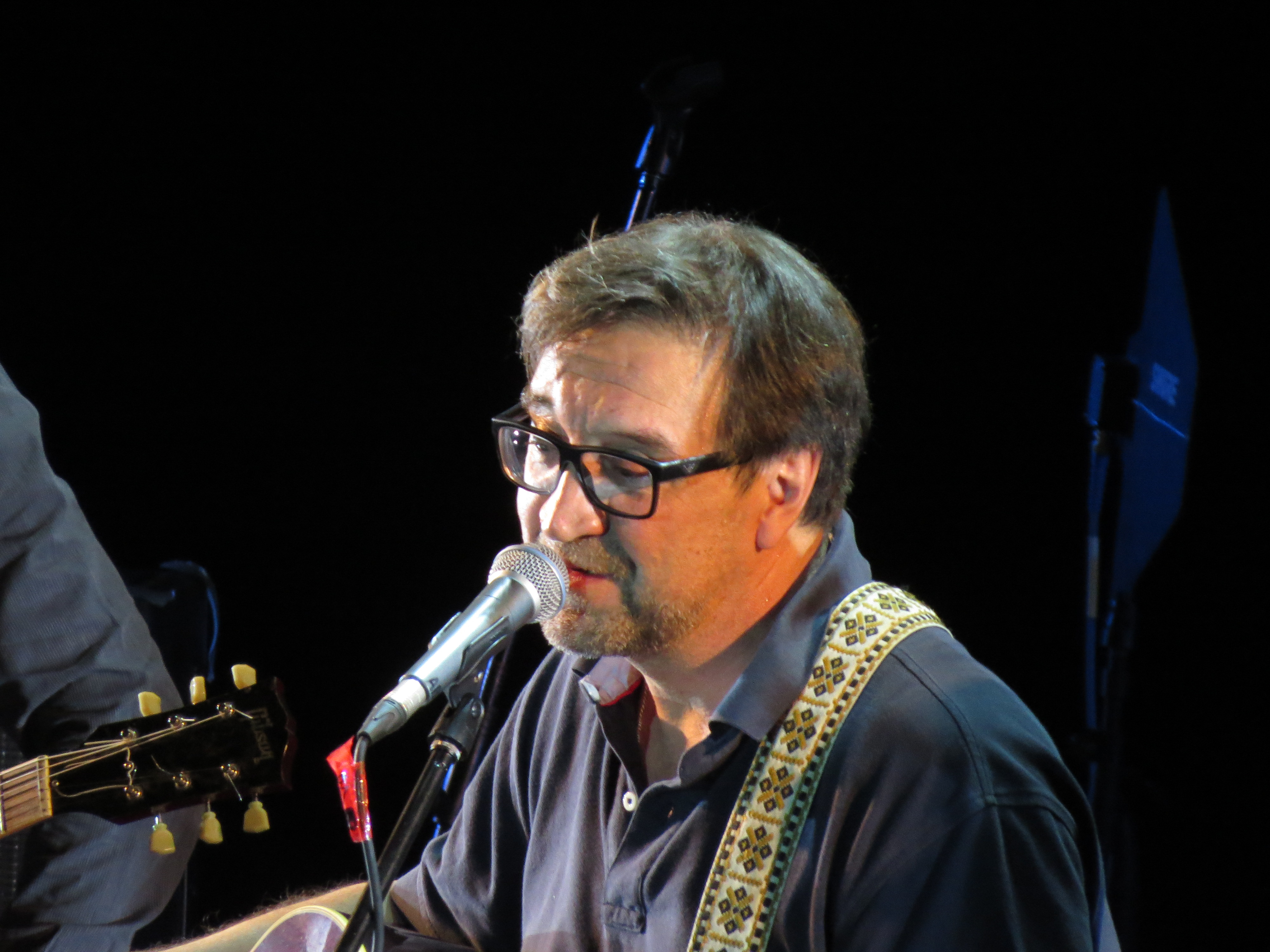
Russian rock singer Yuri Shevchuk was prosecuted after speaking out against the war in Ukraine at a concert in Ufa.

On 18 May 2022, an administrative offense case of discrediting the Russian Armed Forces was filed against musician Yuri Shevchuk, the leader of the rock band DDT, after he said at a concert in Ufa: "The motherland, my friends, is not the president's ass that has to be slobbered and kissed all the time. The motherland is an impoverished old woman at the train station selling potatoes." The case was sent to the court of Sovietsky district of Ufa and subsequently referred to the court of Dzerzhinsky district of Saint Petersburg. This court returned the case due to the lack of description of the violation committed in the police report and on a second occasion due to the lack of Shevchuk's signature and information that he was apprised of his rights. On 16 August, the court of Sovietsky district found Shevchuk guilty of discrediting the armed forces, considering it unimportant that he didn't refer to the Russian Armed Forces at the concert. Shevchuk appealed the judgement in August 2022. In December 2022, his appeal was dismissed.

The first person convicted under criminal code article 207.3 is Pyotr Mylnikov, who posted documents in a Viber chat about mobile crematoriums owned by the Ministry of Defence. On 30 May 2022, Olovyanninsky District court found him guilty of dissemination of unreliable information about Russian Armed Forces and its operations and sentenced him to a fine of 1,000,000 rubles.

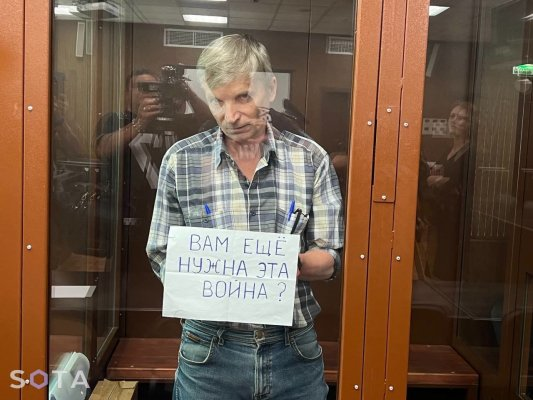
Alexei Gorinov in the dock with an anti-war poster in his hands

The first person imprisoned under criminal code article 207.3 is Alexei Gorinov, a then-60-year-old deputy at Moscow's Krasnoselsky district council, engineer, lawyer and human rights defender. At a council meeting on 15 March 2022 he said: "How can we talk about a children's drawing competition, when children are dying every day?! About 100 children have been killed in Ukraine, and children are becoming orphans. I believe that all efforts of civil society should be aimed at stopping war and withdraw troops from Ukraine." Gorinov maintained his innocence during the case hearing, citing his constitutional rights to free expression, and said: "I thought that Russia exhausted its limit on wars back in the 20th century. However, our present is Bucha, Irpin, and Hostomel. Do these names mean something to you? You, my accusers – take an interest and do not say later that you did not know anything." A Ministry of Justice forensic expert stated that the only fact in his speech was the sentence about killed children, the remainder being personal opinion. Despite this testimony, Gorinov was convicted on 8 July 2022 to seven years imprisonment. Judge Olesya Mendeleyeva ruled that his motivation was "based on political hatred" and that he had misled Russians, prompting them to "feel anxiety and fear" about the invasion, while a sympathizer said this was "historic hell". At that time Gorinov became the first of at least 50 Russian public figures and activists, against whom were initiated a criminal proceedings based on the provisions of the law in issue. On 29 November 2024, Gorinov was sentenced to three additional years in prison, on charges of "advocating terrorism".

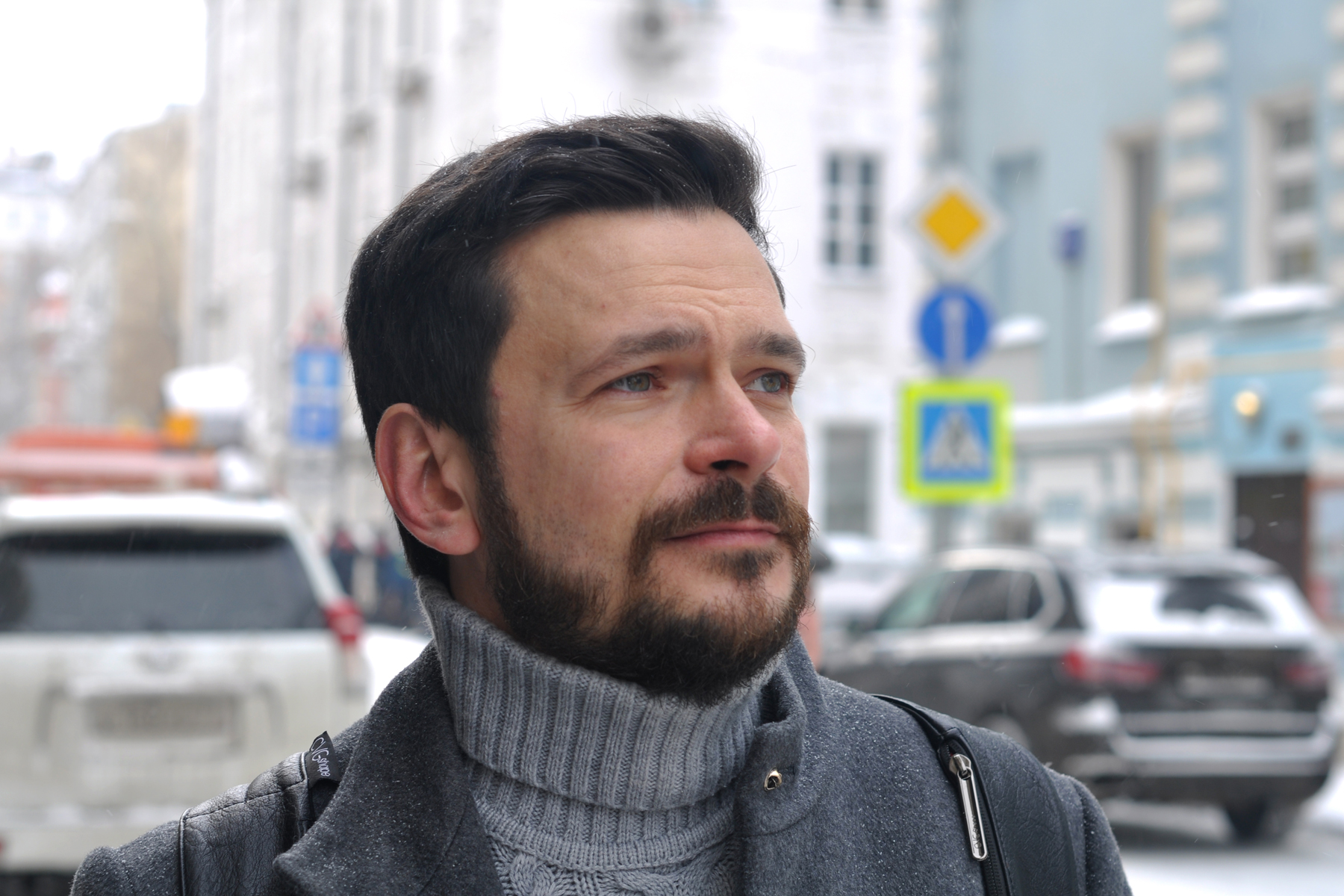
Russian opposition politician Ilya Yashin was sentenced to eight-and-a-half years in prison for discussing the Bucha massacre in Ukraine on a YouTube stream.

In June 2022, Russian opposition politician Ilya Yashin was arrested, and later accused of disseminating fake news about the armed forces. Amnesty International and other organizations have called on the government to free Yashin as they regard his arrest as a violation of his right to freedom of speech. In December 2022, Yashin was sentenced to 8 1/2 years in prison.

In July 2022, Russian authorities charged Novosibirsk city councilor Helga Pirogova with spreading false information about the Russian military. She subsequently fled to Georgia.

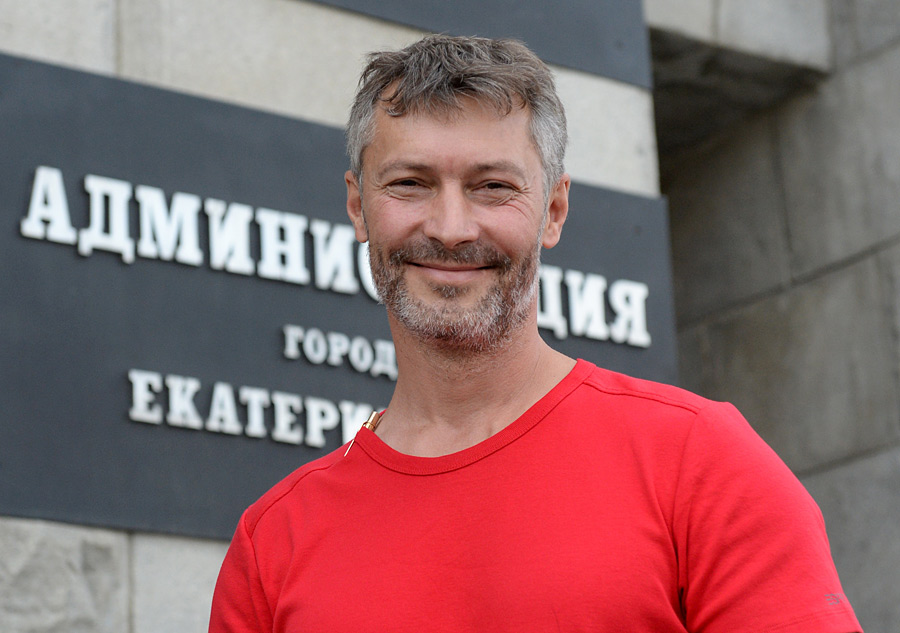
Russian opposition politician Yevgeny Roizman was arrested after criticizing the war in Ukraine.

On 24 August 2022, Russian opposition politician Yevgeny Roizman was detained by police who said he was being charged with discrediting the military. He had previously been fined three times under the same law.

On 9 September 2022, seven council members from Smolninsky District Council in St. Petersburg passed a resolution which called on the State Duma to impeach president Putin for high treason due to his handling of the war in Ukraine. Subsequently, the council was dissolved and the deputies charged with discrediting Russia's military.

In September 2022, Russian musical artist Alla Pugacheva spoke out against the invasion, writing that Russians were dying in Ukraine for "illusory goals", and that the invasion was "turning our country into a pariah and worsening the lives of our citizens." Russian authorities began investigating Pugacheva for discrediting the military.

In September 2022, authorities in Kazakhstan detained a Russian journalist wanted in Russia on charges of "discrediting" the Russian military.

In October 2022, Russian actor Artur Smolyaninov was charged in absentia for discrediting the Russian military for making anti-war statements. He commented; "The laws of this state do not exist for me. They, like the state itself, are inherently criminal, which means they have neither moral nor legal force."

In February 2023, Russian journalist Maria Ponomarenko was sentenced to six years in prison for publishing information about the Mariupol theatre airstrike.

Russian citizen and single father Alexei Moskalyov, who was sentenced to two years in prison for anti-war comments on social media, had been arrested in Minsk, Belarus, on 30 March 2023. His daughter was moved to a state-run "rehabilitation centre" for minors. Putin's spokesman Dmitry Peskov defended Moskalyov's conviction and called the father's parenting "deplorable".

On 7 March 2023, Dmitry Ivanov, a mathematics student at Moscow State University, was sentenced to 8 1/2 years for posting on Telegram about Russian strikes against Ukrainian infrastructure and mass executions in the Ukrainian towns of Bucha and Irpin.

On 23 March 2023, a criminal case was opened against Moscow resident Yury Kokhovets, a participant in the Radio Liberty street poll. He faces up to 10 years in prison.

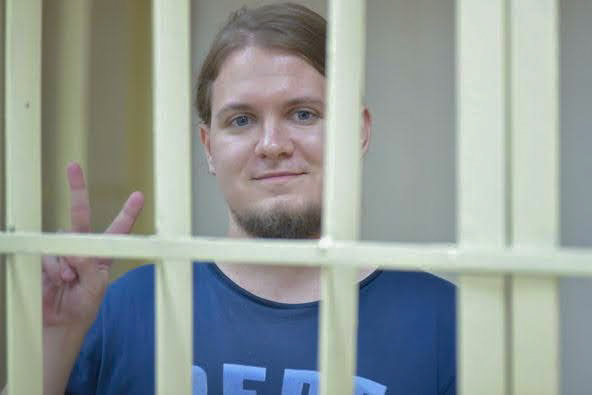
Dmitry Ivanov was sentenced to 8.5 years in prison under Russia's fake news law in March 2023. Amnesty International has recognized Ivanov as a "prisoner of conscience”, and the Memorial has listed him among political prisoners in Russia.

In May 2023, history teacher Nikita Tushkanov from Russia's Komi Republic was sentenced to 5 1/2 years in prison on charges of "justifying terrorism" and "discrediting" the Russian military for calling the Crimean Bridge explosion "a birthday gift for Putler."

On 22 June 2023, Russian pensioner Igor Baryshnikov was sentenced to 7.5 years in prison on charges of spreading "false information" about the Russian military, despite a serious illness. The verdict was handed down by judge Olga Balandina.

In July 2023, two children in Arkhangelsk Oblast were called as witnesses in a criminal case against their mother accused of "discrediting" the Russian army. The local investigator in Mirny threatened the children with legal action and fines if they did not appear in his office.

On 7 August 2023, Russian science fiction writer Dmitry Glukhovsky was sentenced to 8 years in prison for spreading "false information" about Russia's armed forces.

In August 2023, Russian authorities opened a criminal case against Russian-American journalist Masha Gessen on charges of spreading "false information" about the Russian army's actions in Ukraine. In December 2023, it was reported that Gessen was placed on the Russian Interior Ministry's online wanted list. Gessen was accused of spreading "false information" after discussing atrocities in the Ukrainian city of Bucha during an interview with Russian journalist Yury Dud.

In September 2023, Russian YouTuber Alexander Nozdrinov was sentenced to 8.5 years in prison for spreading "fake news". He was detained in March 2022 after investigators accused him of publishing a photo of a destroyed building in Kyiv. Nozdrinov addressed corruption by local authorities on his YouTube channel and denied posting a photo from Ukraine. His lawyer Olesya Panyuzheva said the case against Nozdrinov showed that "anyone who … has a public activity, uncovers crimes and wrongdoings of corrupt police officers and representatives of the court and other law enforcement agencies, can be put behind bars."

Russian theologian Andrey Kuraev, who took an anti-war position and actively criticized the decisions of Patriarch Kirill, was fined for "discrediting the Russian army." He left Russia in October 2023.

On 4 October 2023, Russian journalist Marina Ovsyannikova was sentenced in absentia to 8.5 years in prison for "spreading false information" about the Russian Army. Ovsyannikova called the sentence "politically motivated" and "absurd".

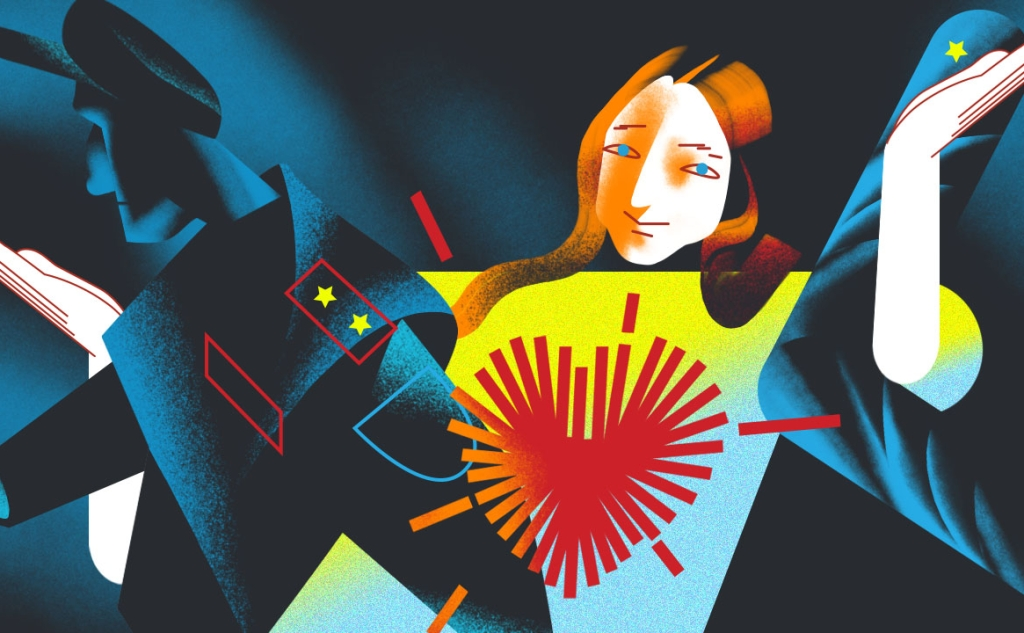
Illustration depicting Russian artist Aleksandra Skochilenko, who was arrested for replacing supermarket price tags with anti-war messages

On 16 November 2023, Russian artist Aleksandra Skochilenko was sentenced to seven years of imprisonment for replacing supermarket price tags with antiwar slogans in 2022.

In November 2023, Moscow's Basmanny District Court found Russian blogger and tech worker living in Canada, Maria Kartasheva, guilty of violating Russia's wartime censorship laws and sentenced her to eight years in prison. Her arrest in absentia was approved by Russian judge Elena Lenskaya.

In November 2023, Russian-Canadian activist Pyotr Verzilov was sentenced in absentia to 8.5 years in prison for spreading "fake" news after reporting on social media about the Bucha massacre.

In December 2023, Archbishop Viktor Pivovarov, the head of the Slavic and South Russian Orthodox Church, which is not part of the Moscow Patriarchate, was charged for "repeatedly discrediting" the Russian armed forces.

On 28 December 2023, Russian poets Artyom Kamardin and Yegor Shtovba were sentenced to 7 and 5.5 years in prison respectively for reading anti-war poems during a street performance in Moscow in September 2022. By comparison, a day later, a Russian veteran of the war in Ukraine was sentenced to 7.5 years in prison for murdering a man who criticized his participation in the war.

In February 2024, Novaya Gazeta's editor-in-chief Sergei Sokolov was arrested in Moscow on charges of “discrediting” Russia's armed forces.

On 6 March 2024, Russian journalist Roman Ivanov was sentenced to 7 years in prison for spreading “fake news” about the Russian army. In social media posts published in 2022, Ivanov wrote about the Bucha massacre and other war crimes of the Russian military.

In April 2024, Forbes Russia journalist Sergey Mingazov was arrested on charges of spreading "false information" about the Russian armed forces.

On 5 June 2024, the Ostankinsky District Court sentenced Russian streamer Anna Bazhutova to five and a half years in prison on charges of spreading "false information" about the Russian military. Bazhutova made a live stream on Twitch that included testimonies of the Bucha massacre back in April 2022.

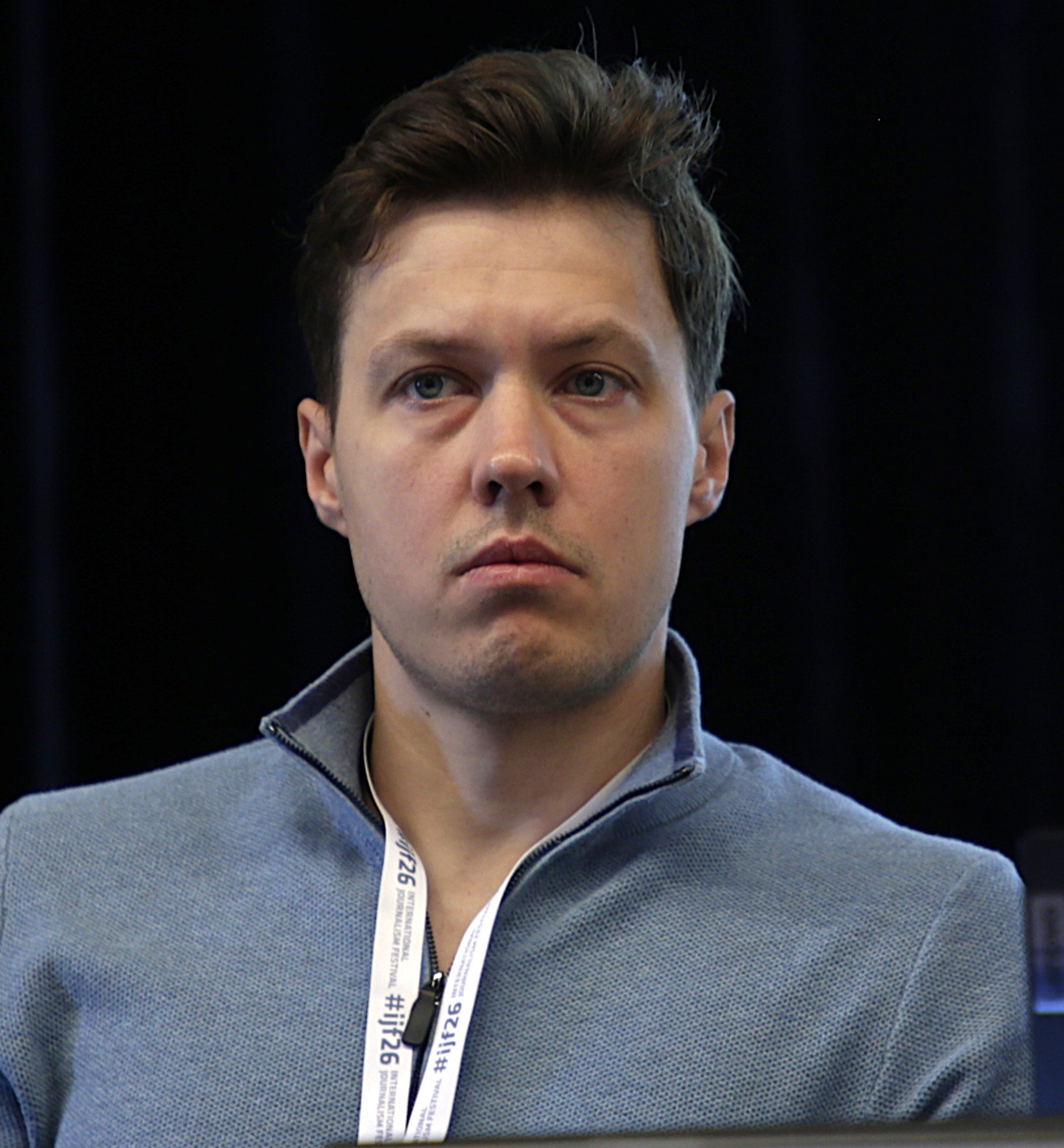
Investigative journalist Roman Anin at the 2026 International Journalism Festival. Russian authorities issued an arrest warrant for him in 2024.

On 17 June 2024, a Moscow court issued arrest warrants for IStories editor-in-chief and award-winning investigative reporter Roman Anin and Ekaterina Fomina, a journalist at TV Rain and a former IStories correspondent, on charges of disseminating "false information" about the Russian armed forces. Russia's Interior Ministry added two Russian journalists in exile to its wanted list. In the spring of 2022, Fomina published an investigative report regarding war crimes in the Russian invasion of Ukraine. Fomina said the arrest warrant would affect her professional life as she would not be able to travel to many countries that could arrest her and extradite her to Russia. IStories wrote in response that "The Russian authorities call ‘fake’ any information that does not fit in with their propaganda campaign or does not correspond to the official position of the Kremlin."

In July 2024, Russian-American journalist Alsu Kurmasheva was sentenced to 6.5 years in prison for spreading "false information" about the Russian army. The charges were related to a book she had edited after the invasion of Ukraine, “Saying No To War,” which featured stories of 40 Russians who opposed the invasion.

In August 2024, journalist Sergei Mikhailov was sentenced to eight years in prison for “intentionally spreading false information” about the Russian army. He was arrested in 2022 after reporting about civilian casualties and war crimes in Mariupol and Bucha.

As of August 2024, Russian authorities opened more than 10,000 cases against people accused of "discrediting" the Russian armed forces.

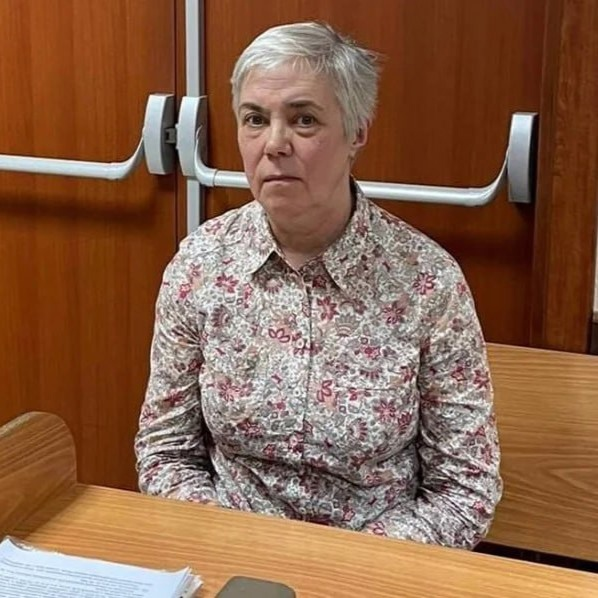
Pediatrician Nadezhda Buyanova was sentenced to 5.5 years in prison.

In November 2024, Ukrainian-born Russian pediatrician Nadezhda Buyanova was sentenced to 5.5 years in prison after her patient's mother reported her to the police for allegedly making pro-Ukrainian comments. Buyanova denied such comments, and there is no audio or video recording to prove she made them. A group of Russian doctors came to her defense, and a petition for her release received more than 6,000 signatures.

In February 2025, the mother of a Russian soldier fighting in Ukraine was charged under the law after she wrote that "young guys are being put in the ground when they shouldn’t be".

In April 2025, anti-war activist Darya Kozyreva was sentenced to two years and eight months in prison for "discrediting" the Russian Armed Forces. The charges concerned her social media posts opposing the invasion of Ukraine and an interview in which she described the invasion as "monstrous" and "criminal".

In August 2025, Russian blogger and YouTuber Ilya Varlamov was sentenced in absentia to 8 years in prison by a Moscow court for spreading "fake news" about the Russian army and violating foreign agent laws.

In June 2026, opposition politician Maksim Kruglov, deputy chair of the Yabloko party and former member of the Moscow City Duma, was sentenced to seven years in a penal colony for allegedly spreading "knowingly false information" about the Russian military in social media posts referring to civilian deaths in Bucha and Mariupol.

Lev Shlosberg, deputy chairman of the Yabloko party, 12 March 2020

In August 2026, Yabloko politician Lev Shlosberg was sentenced to 11 years and one month in a penal colony for "discrediting" the Russian Armed Forces and spreading allegedly false information about the military. The charges stemmed from his participation in an online debate about the war in Ukraine and his subsequent reposting of the video on Telegram.

In September 2026, Russian authorities charged Lida Moniava, founder of the Lighthouse children's hospice, under Article 207.3 with disseminating allegedly false information about the Russian military's actions against Ukrainian civilians. She had previously been fined for "discrediting" the armed forces over anti-war posts on Telegram.

=== Attempted application against Wikipedia ===
In February and March 2022, Russian Wikipedia editors warned their readers and fellow editors of several reiterated attempts by the Russian government of political censorship, internet propaganda, disinformation, attacks, and disruptive editing towards an article reporting Russian military casualties and Ukrainian civilian casualties of the ongoing war.

On 1 March 2022, Russian state media censorship agency Roskomnadzor threatened to block Wikipedia over the Russian Wikipedia article on Russia's invasion of Ukraine (Russian: Вторжение России на Украину (2022)). The concerns were raised again on 29 March.

On 11 March, Belarusian political police (GUBOPiK) arrested prominent Belarusian Wikipedia editor Mark Bernstein for the "spread of anti-Russian materials" and violating the "fake news" law. One day prior, the Russian Telegram channel Мракоборец exposed the personal details of the editor, arguing that Bernstein had allegedly made illegal edits to Wikipedia articles about Russia's assault on Ukraine.

On 31 March 2022, Roskomnadzor threatened Wikipedia with a fine of up to 4 million rubles "for failure to remove unreliable socially significant materials, as well as other prohibited information" about the invasion.

On 4 April 2022, Civic Chamber of Russia member Ekaterina Mizulina asked the Prosecutor General's Office and Roskomnadzor to investigate Wikipedia for a criminal offence in connection with the dissemination of information about the invasion. On the same day, Roskomnadzor sent a request to the Wikipedia administration to remove information from five articles from Russian Wikipedia: Battle of Kyiv (2022) (Russian: Битва за Киев (2022)); War crimes in the 2022 Russian invasion of Ukraine (Russian: Военные преступления в период вторжения России на Украину); Mariupol hospital airstrike (Russian: Обстрел больницы в Мариуполе); Mariupol theatre airstrike (Russian: Бомбардировка Мариупольского театра); and Bucha massacre (Russian: Резня в Буче). On 26 April, a court fined the Wikimedia Foundation 3 million rubles for failing to remove seven Wikipedia articles on the invasion. At the end of May 2022, Roskomnadzor demanded that Wikipedia remove the articles Battle of Kharkiv (2022) (Russian: ru:Бои за Харьков (2022)) and Use of white phosphorus bombs in the 2022 Russian invasion of Ukraine (Russian: ru:Обвинения в использовании фосфорных боеприпасов в период вторжения России на Украину (2022)).

In April–July 2022, Russian authorities added several Wikipedia articles to their list of forbidden sites and ordered search engines to mark Wikipedia as a violator of Russian laws.

== Perversion of law ==
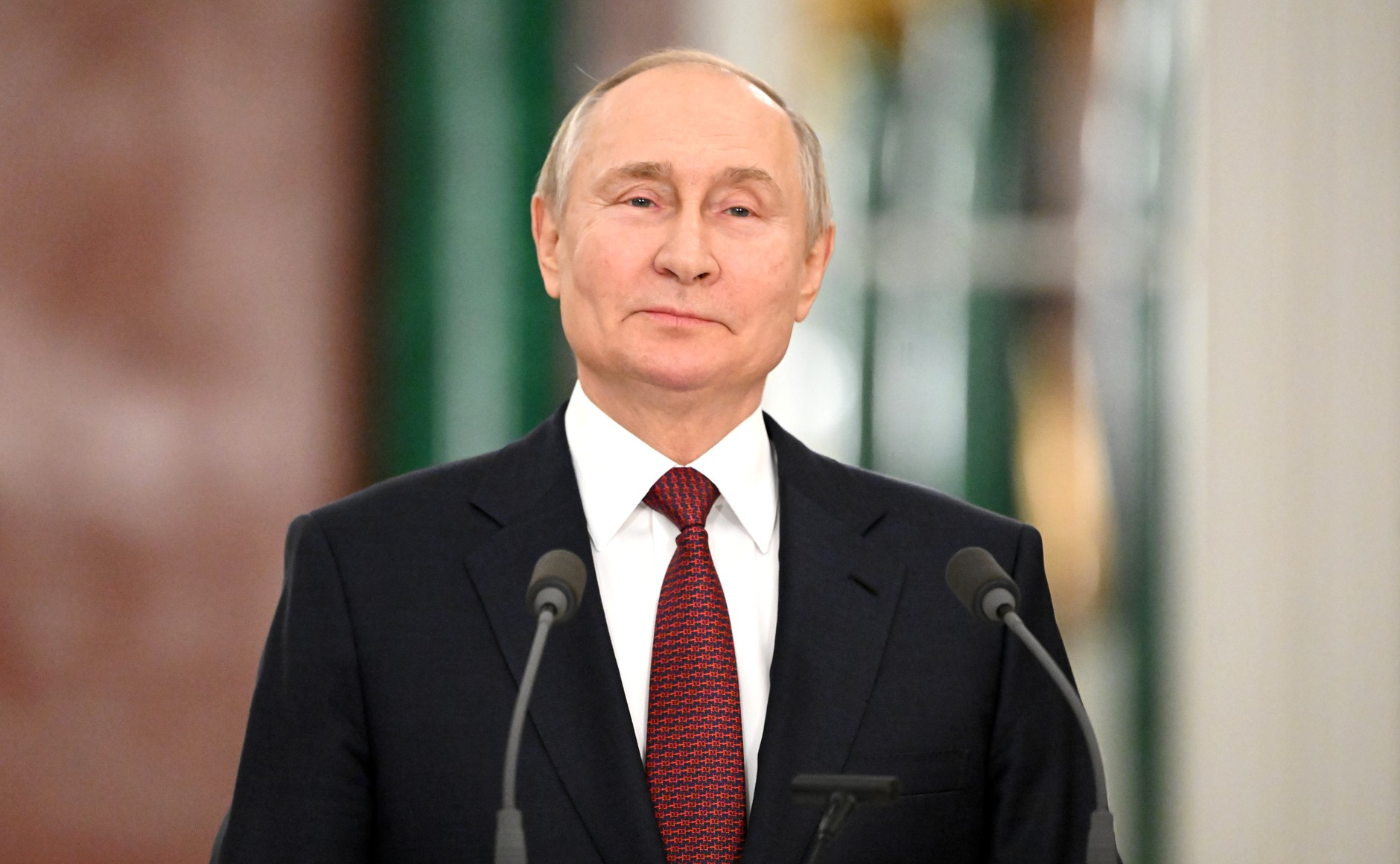
Russian President Vladimir Putin has been accused of breaking his own law.

The Putin administration was quick to pervert the law which it had passed scant months before, applying it to political opponents but not to allies. Political scientists favoured by the Kremlin including Sergey Karaganov have openly used the word "war" – instead of the legally-mandated "police action" or lexically approved "special military operation" – without the legal consequences faced by opponents.

On 13 May 2022, former FSB officer and pro-war military blogger Igor Girkin harshly criticized Russian Minister of Defence Sergei Shoigu, accusing him of "criminal negligence" in conducting the invasion. On 23 August, Girkin called Putin a clown. After large Ukrainian counteroffensives in September 2022 (the Kherson and Kharkiv counteroffensives), Girkin called for Shoigu to be executed by firing squad and publicly expressed the opinion that "The war in Ukraine will continue until the complete defeat of Russia. We have already lost; the rest is just a matter of time." Pro-Kremlin war journalist Alexander Kots publicly stated that "We need to do something about the system where our leadership doesn't like to talk about bad news, and their subordinates don't want to upset their superiors." Unlike the liberal and pro-democracy opposition to Vladimir Putin and independent journalists who are persecuted for criticizing Putin or the war in Ukraine, ultra-nationalists and pro-war activists like Girkin and Kots are considered untouchable because they are protected by high-ranking members of the military and intelligence services. Despite this, Girkin has been arrested as of 21 July 2023.

On 13 September 2022, Russian Communist Party (KPRF) leader Gennady Zyuganov, told State Duma that the "special military operation" in Ukraine "has turned into a full-fledged war."

Chairman of the State Duma's Defense Committee Andrey Kartapolov said the Russian Defense Ministry should "stop lying" to the public about the situation in Ukraine because "Our people are not stupid. They see that authorities don’t want to tell them even part of the truth. It may lead to a loss of credibility."

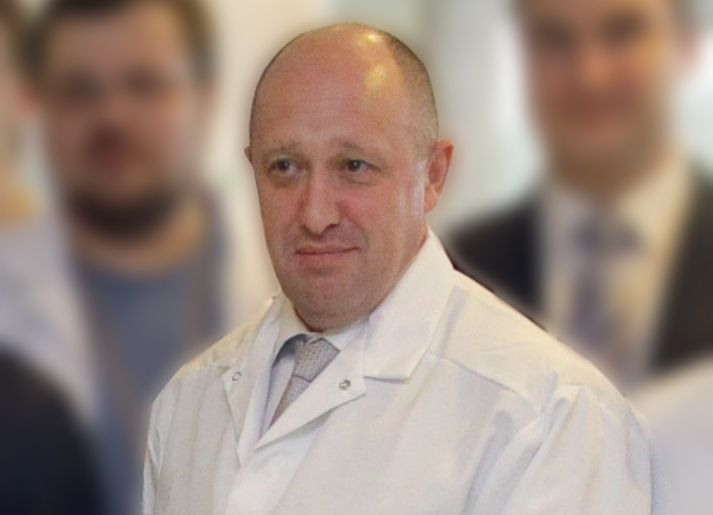
In a video released on 23 June 2023, Wagner leader Yevgeny Prigozhin said that Russian government justifications for the Russian invasion of Ukraine were based on lies.

On 5 October 2022, Kremlin propagandist Vladimir Solovyov said that some high-ranking Russian commanders should be shot by firing squad. Putin's associate Yevgeny Prigozhin, owner of mercenary group Wagner, said about the commanders of the Russian army that "All these bastards ought to be sent to the front barefoot with just a submachine gun."

Putin, his first deputy chief of staff Sergei Kiriyenko, and leading pro-Kremlin lawmaker Sergei Mironov were accused of breaking the fakes laws. In December 2022, Nikita Yuferev, a deputy of the St. Petersburg Smolninskoye Municipal District, asked Russian authorities to investigate Putin for using the word "war" to describe Russia's invasion of Ukraine. Yuferev posted on Twitter that "there was no decree to end the SVO [the so-called 'special military operation'], and war was never declared. Several thousand people have already been convicted for such words about war. I've asked the authorities look into Putin for spreading fakes about the army."

On 27 May 2023, Igor Girkin accused Yevgeny Prigozhin of actively violating Russia's war censorship laws by complaining about the Russian high command. In a video released on 23 June 2023, Prigozhin said that Russian government justifications for the Russian invasion of Ukraine were based on lies. He accused the Russian Defense Ministry under Sergei Shoigu of "trying to deceive society and the president and tell us how there was crazy aggression from Ukraine and that they were planning to attack us with the whole of NATO." Prigozhin said the war was not needed to "demilitarize or denazify Ukraine."

== Reactions ==
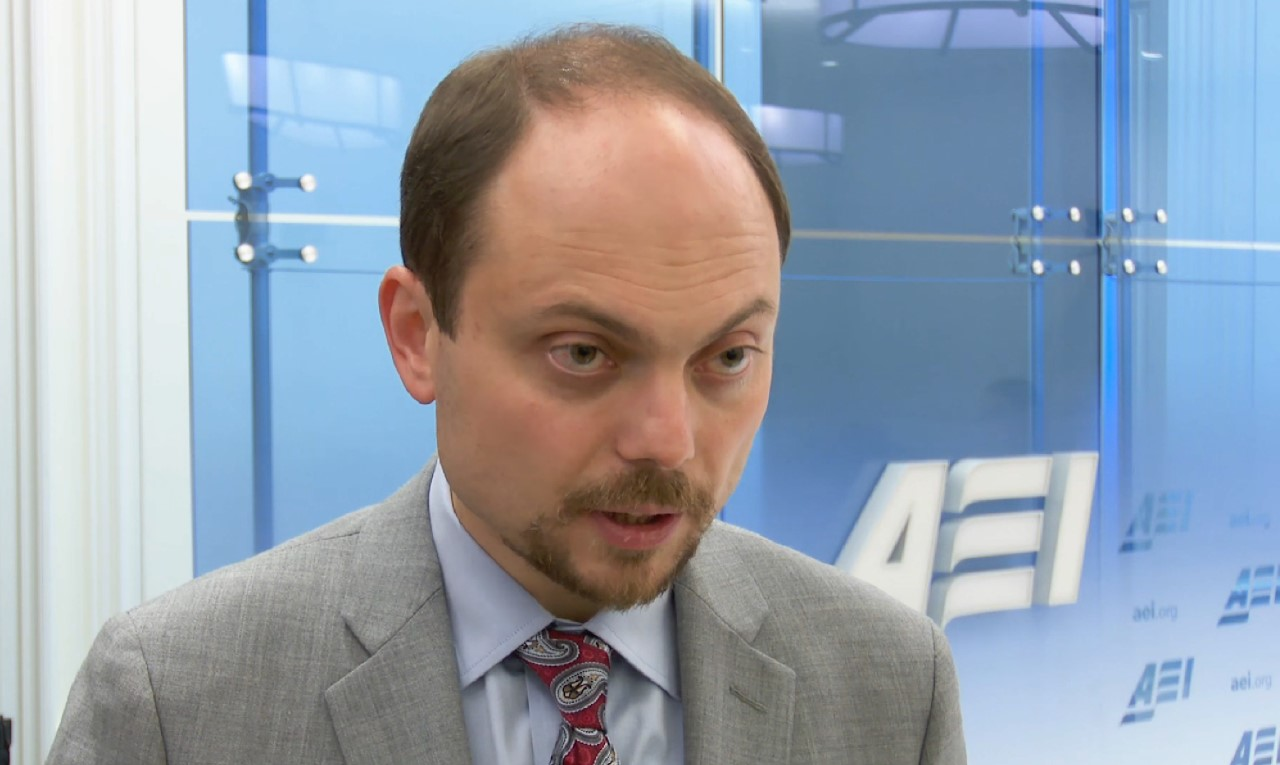
Vladimir Kara-Murza compared his case to show trials from the Stalin era.

On 14 March 2022, Amnesty International published a statement criticizing Russian laws promulgated on 4 March 2022. Amnesty International strongly condemns the escalating attack against civil society organizations and independent media unleashed by the Russian authorities since the start of Russia's invasion of Ukraine on 24 February 2022, and urges the Russian authorities to abide by their international human rights obligations and Russia's Constitution to respect, protect and fulfill the rights to freedom of expression, association and peaceful assembly. The organization specifically urged authorities to allow peaceful anti-war protests to go ahead unhindered; to release all peaceful protesters and drop the charges against them; to lift all restrictions on independent media and overturn or amend all laws that overly and arbitrarily restrict the rights to freedom of expression, association and peaceful assembly. The organization is calling on the international community to stand in solidarity with and provide support to Russian civil society activists, human rights defenders and journalists who are at increased risk for expressing their opposition to Russia's invasion of Ukraine.

Hugh Williamson, Europe and Central Asia director at Human Rights Watch, said that "These new laws are part of Russia’s ruthless effort to suppress all dissent and make sure the [Russian] population does not have access to any information that contradicts the Kremlin’s narrative about the invasion of Ukraine."

On 11 February 2025, the European Court of Human Rights (ECHR) ruled that Russia's 2022 wartime censorship laws were illegal and violated the right to freedom of expression.

== See also ==
- Basmanny Justice
- Russian fake news laws
- Media freedom in Russia
- Russian Wikipedia
- Media portrayal of the Russo-Ukrainian War
- Russian information war against Ukraine
- Political repression in the Soviet Union
- 2016–present purges in Turkey
