= Prisoner of conscience =

Anyone imprisoned for their demographics, beliefs, or the nonviolent expression thereof

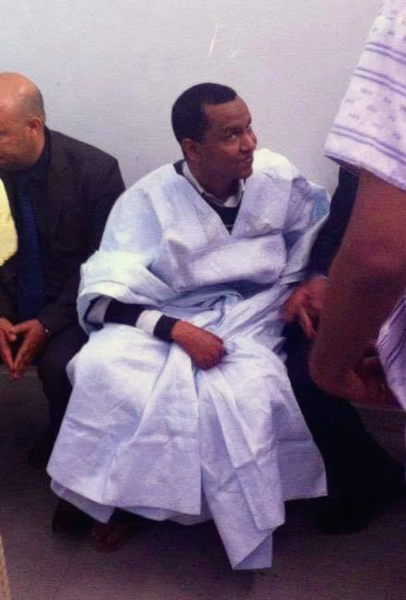
Mohamed Cheikh Ould Mkhaitir was sentenced to death after he wrote an article critical of religion and the caste system in Mauritania. He later moved to France.

A prisoner of conscience (POC) is anyone imprisoned because of their race, sexual orientation, religion, or political views. The term also refers to those who have been imprisoned or persecuted for the nonviolent expression of their conscientiously held beliefs.

Most often associated with the human rights organisation Amnesty International, the term was coined by that organisation's founder Peter Benenson in a 28 May 1961 article ("The Forgotten Prisoners") for London newspaper The Observer.

== Definition ==
The article "The Forgotten Prisoners" by English lawyer Peter Benenson, published in The Observer on 28 May 1961, launched the campaign "Appeal for Amnesty 1961" and first defined a "prisoner of conscience".

Any person who is physically restrained (by imprisonment or otherwise) from expressing (in any form of words or symbols) any opinion which he honestly holds and which does not advocate or condone personal violence. We also exclude those people who have conspired with a foreign government to overthrow their own.

The primary goal of this year-long campaign, founded by Benenson and a small group of writers, academics and lawyers, including Quaker peace activist Eric Baker, was to identify individual prisoners of conscience around the world and then campaign for their release. In early 1962, the campaign had received enough public support to become a permanent organization and was renamed Amnesty International.

In 1995, Amnesty International changed Benenson's original definition to include people "deprived of their liberty... for discriminatory reasons relating to their ethnicity, sexuality, gender, or other identity", and to exclude people who have "advocated hatred". This caused Alexei Navalny's status as a POC to be rescinded in February 2021 due to comments he made on migrants in 2007 and 2008 which Amnesty International regarded as "hate speech".

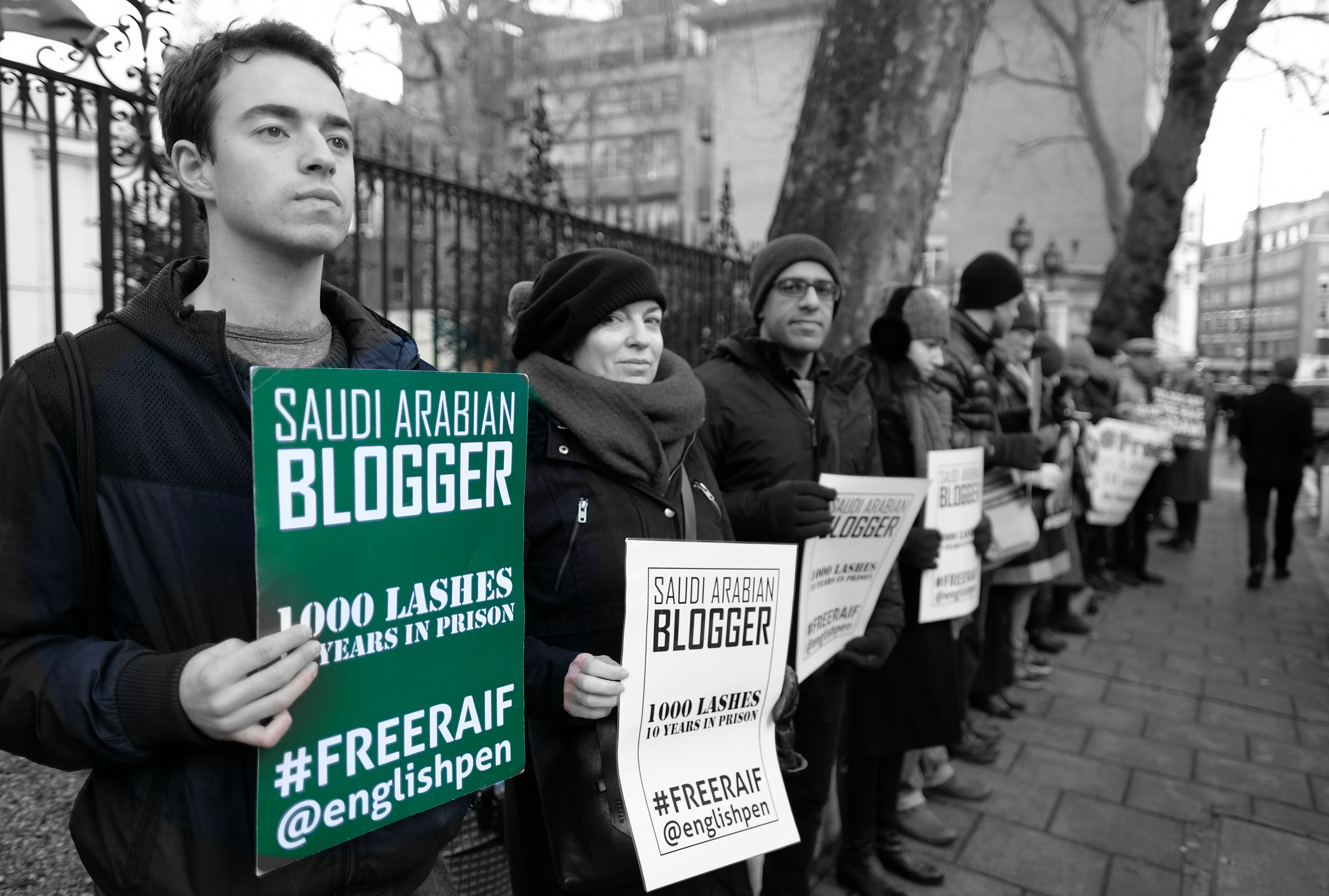
A protest outside the Saudi Arabian Embassy in London against the detention of Saudi blogger Raif Badawi, 2017

Amnesty International announced "a review of its overall approach to the use of the term 'Prisoner of Conscience'", following the controversy surrounding the use of the term to describe Alexei Navalny, stating, "[a]s an initial interim step, our approach has been refined to not exclude a person from designation as a Prisoner of Conscience solely based on their conduct in the past", and that Navalny has been "re-designate[d]" as a Prisoner of Conscience.

Under British law, Amnesty International was classed as a political organisation and therefore excluded from tax-free charity status. To work around this, the "Fund for the Persecuted" was established in 1962 to receive donations to support prisoners and their families. The name was later changed to the "Prisoners of Conscience Appeal Fund" and is now a separate and independent charity which provides relief and rehabilitation grants to prisoners of conscience in the UK and around the world.

Amnesty International has, since its founding, pressured governments to release those persons it considers to be prisoners of conscience. Governments, conversely, tend to deny that the specific prisoners identified by Amnesty International are, in fact, being held on the grounds Amnesty claims; they allege that these prisoners pose genuine threats to the security of their countries.

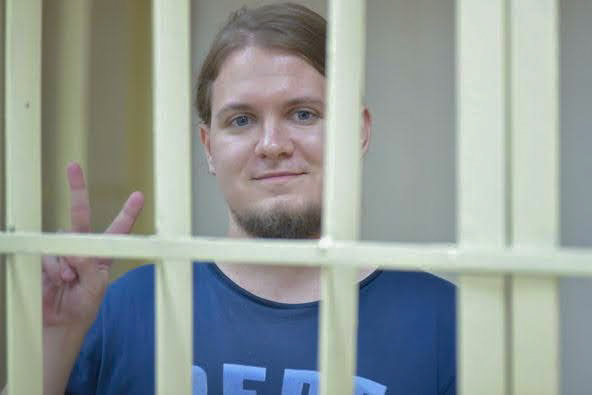
Dmitry Ivanov, a prisoner of conscience sentenced to eight and a half years in prison in March 2023 under Russia's war censorship laws for his anti-war posts.

The concept of "prisoners of conscience" became a controversy around Nelson Mandela's imprisonment in South Africa 1964. He had initially been adopted as a prisoner of conscience in 1962, when he was sentenced to five years in jail for inciting a strike of African workers. This was reversed after the Rivonia Trial showed that Mandela now had turned to violently opposing the South African regime. The reversal evolved in 1964 into a worldwide debate and a poll among the members of Amnesty International. The overwhelming majority decided to maintain the basic rule, that prisoners of conscience are those who have not used or advocated violence.

The phrase is now widely used in political discussions to describe a political prisoner, whether or not Amnesty International has specifically adopted the case, although the phrase has a different scope and definition than that of political prisoner.
