= Saint Petersburg State University of Aerospace Instrumentation =

Saint Petersburg State University of Aerospace Instrumentation (SUAI)
- Санкт-Петербургский государственный автономный университет аэрокосмического приборостроения (ГУАП)
- Type: Public
- Established: 1941
- Rector: Yulia Antokhina
- Location: SUAI, 67, Bolshaya Morskaia, 190000, Saint-Petersburg, RUSSIA, Saint Petersburg & Ivangorod, Russia; 59°55′46″N 30°17′46″E
- Campus: urban
- Website: guap.ru (in Russian) suai.ru (in English) guap.info/en/ (in English)

University rankings

Regional – Overall
- QS Emerging Europe and Central Asia: 301-350 (2022)

The Saint Petersburg State University of Aerospace Instrumentation (Russian: Санкт-Петербургский государственный университет аэрокосмического приборостроения) is a university with 13 faculties in Saint Petersburg, Russia. Faculties are devoted to innovation management, aerospace engineering, electronic engineering, energy development, computer science, telecommunication, humanities, military science, economics, jurisprudence and special faculties for distance education and recently acquired colleges.

The University has several buildings and campuses, two of them located near Chesme Church. Main building is located on the bank of the Moyka River, on the opposite bank of the river stands the building of Moika Palace. One campus of SUAI is situated in Ivangorod, near the border with Estonia.

== Faculties ==
Name	Established	Quantity of departments
Institute of innovation and basic training of master's	2008	5
Institute of aerospace equipment and systems	1941	4
Institute of radio engineering, electronics and telecommunication	1945	4
Institute of innovative technologies in electromechanics and energy development	1962	2
Institute of computer systems and computer programming	1962	4
Institute of information systems and information security	2005	4
Faculty of humanities	1991	4
Institute of military education	2001	2
Institute of business technologies	1986	5
Faculty of jurisprudence	1994	6
Institute for open and distance learning	1951	2
Faculty of additional professional education	1969	2
Faculty of vocational education (two united colleges)	1930/2009	5
Campus in Ivangorod	2000	6

== History ==
In 1941 the institute was founded as the "Leningrad Institute of Aviation" (Russian: Ленинградский авиационный институт). In 1945 the institute was reorganized as the "Leningrad Institute of Aviation Instrumentation" (Russian: Ленинградский институт авиационного приборостроения (ЛИАП)). In 1992 the Leningrad Institute of Aerospace Instrumentation passed the state accreditation and has received a new status – Saint-Petersburg State Academy of Aerospace Instrumentation (Russian: Санкт-Петербургская государственная академия аэрокосмического приборостроения (ГААП)).

In 1998 the Saint-Petersburg State Academy of Aerospace Instrumentation passed the state accreditation and has received a new status – Saint-Petersburg State University of Aerospace Instrumentation (abbreviation SUAI) (Russian: Санкт-Петербургский государственный университет аэрокосмического приборостроения (ГУАП)).

== Plagiarism cases in University academical staff ==
Russian civic activity site dissernet.org has published an investigation which demonstrates a significant amount of plagiarism in the Doktor Nauk degree thesis of the current head of SUAI Prof. Antokhina.

== Notable students and alumni ==
- Anatoly Glushenkov – first democratically elected Governor of Smolensk Oblast (1993–1998)
- Konstantin Khabensky – actor
- Viktor Khryapa – bronze medalist of Summer Olympic Games 2012
- Oleg Kuvaev – artist, designer and animator
- Andrey Moguchy – artistic director of Tovstonogov Bolshoi Drama Theater
- Georgy Poltavchenko – Governor of Saint Petersburg
- Viktor Rashchupkin – Olympic Champion of Summer Olympic Games 1980
- Anatoly Roshchin – Olympic Champion of Summer Olympic Games 1972
- Maria Semyonova – writer
- Andrey Turchak – Governor of Pskov Oblast
- Alexander Vasilyev – musician (not ended)
- Natalia Vorobieva – Olympic Champion of Summer Olympic Games 2012

== Famous faculty ==
- Yuri Vasilyevich Gulyayev – full Member of the USSR Academy of Sciences (1984–1991), the Russian Academy of Sciences (since 1991)
- Nikolay Nikolayevich Krasil'nikov – professor, winner of the Russian Federation Government Prize in Education (2009)
