= Igor Baryshnikov =

Russian engineer and social activist

Igor Lazarevich Baryshnikov (Russian: Игорь Лазаревич Барышников; born January 20, 1959) is a Russian engineer, a social activist from the Kaliningrad Oblast, who in 2023 was sentenced to 7.5 years in prison under "dissemination of knowingly false information about the actions of the Armed Forces of the Russian Federation", despite a serious illness.

June 22, 2023 Judge Olga Balandina handed down the verdict.

On August 7, 2023, Igor Baryshnikov's mother, Yevgenia Veniaminovna (1926 — 2023), died in Sovetsk, whose condition worsened sharply after her son was arrested. She was a victim of the Holocaust, as a child she was able to escape from the Nazis in Polotsk, and all her relatives were killed. Igor was not allowed to attend the funeral.

Memorial recognized Igor Baryshnikov as a political prisoner.

== See also ==
- Protests against the Russian invasion of Ukraine
- Russian 2022 war censorship laws
