= Lida Moniava =

Russian charity executive and palliative care advocate

- Лида Мониава
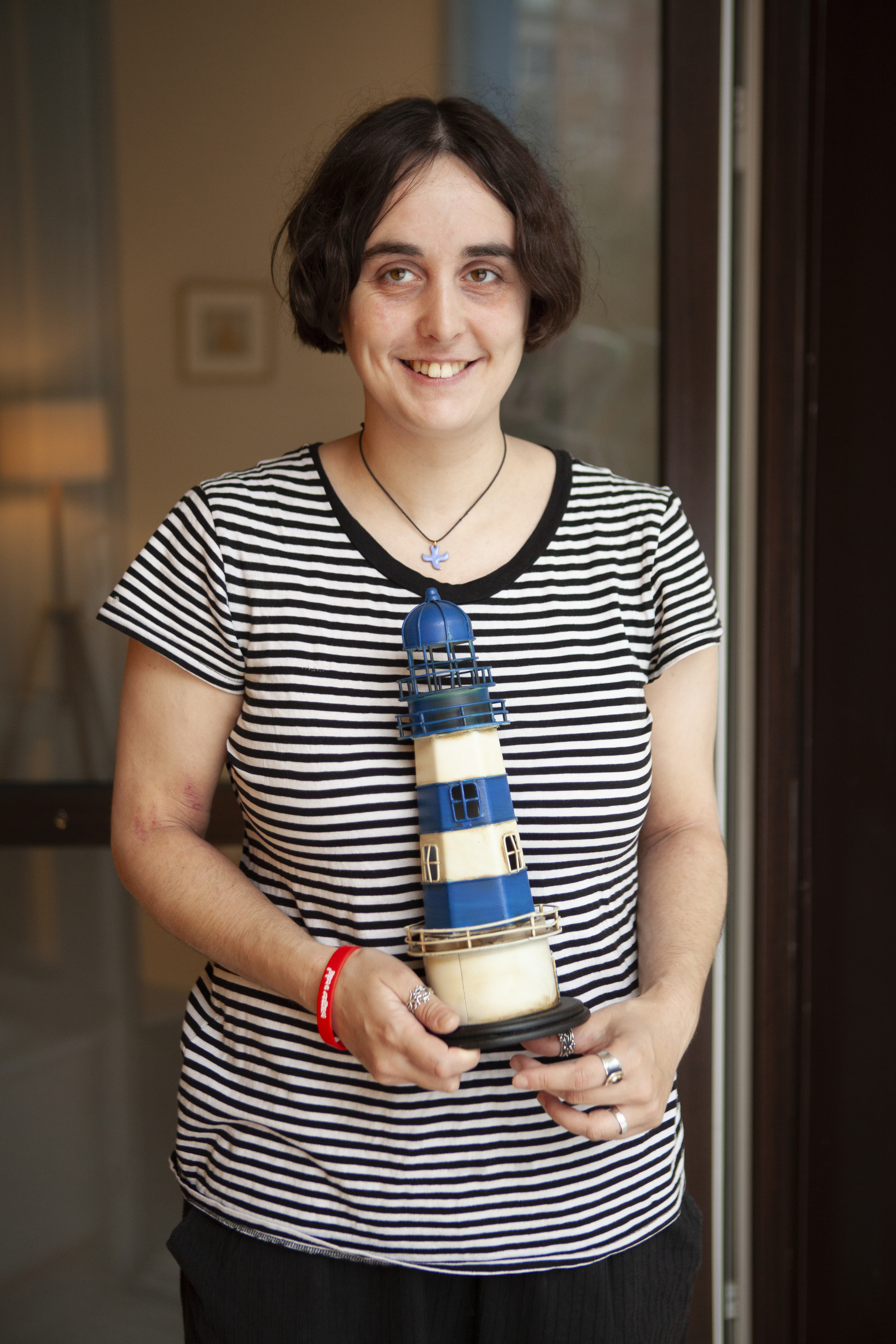
- Born: 29 November 1987 (age 38); Moscow, Russian SFSR, Soviet Union
- Education: Moscow State University
- Occupation: Charity executive
- Known for: Pediatric palliative care; House with a Lighthouse

Lidiya Igorevna Moniava (Russian: Ли́дия И́горевна Мониа́ва; born 29 November 1987), commonly known as Lida Moniava, is a Russian charity executive and pediatric palliative care advocate. She is a co-founder and director of the Lighthouse Charity Foundation, which supports children's hospice and palliative care programs in Moscow and the Moscow Region. Her work has focused on home-based care for seriously ill children, pain management and access to medicines, family support, and efforts to enable children and young adults with severe disabilities to participate in education and community life.

In 2020, Moniava became the guardian of a boy known publicly as Kolya, who had previously lived in a residential institution; the case became the focus of public debate about disability inclusion and alternatives to institutional care. After the Russian invasion of Ukraine in 2022, she also helped organize a separate charitable initiative assisting people displaced by the war. Her charitable work has received several awards, including an RBC Prize and a Forbes Woman Mercury Award.

Moniava has publicly opposed the Russian invasion of Ukraine. In February 2026, a Moscow court fined her 45,000 rubles under an administrative provision prohibiting the "discrediting" of the Russian Armed Forces. On 2 September 2026, investigators searched her home, charged her under Article 207.3 of the Russian Criminal Code with disseminating information about the Russian military that they alleged she knew to be false, and detained her. Moniava denied the charge. On 3 September, the Simonovsky District Court of Moscow imposed a pre-trial measure known as a "ban on certain actions" until 30 October, including a nighttime curfew, a ban on internet use, and restrictions on communication with witnesses. On 6 October, it was reported that the criminal case had been closed on the grounds that her actions did not constitute a criminal offense.

== Early life and charity work ==
Moniava was born in Moscow. While still at school, she began volunteering in the oncohematology department of the Russian Children's Clinical Hospital, spending time with children undergoing lengthy treatment. She studied journalism at Moscow State University and later contributed to the newspaper Vechernyaya Moskva.

Moniava later joined the charity Podari Zhizn, where she worked as a personal assistant to its director, Galina Chalikova. In 2011, she moved to the Vera Hospice Charity Fund and coordinated its children's program, increasingly focusing on palliative care for seriously ill children.

== Pediatric palliative care and House with a Lighthouse ==
=== Home-based care and organizational development ===
A separate medical organization, the Children's Hospice, was registered in Moscow in 2013. Its early work focused primarily on home-based palliative care. Moniava became deputy director of the children's hospice in 2014.

In 2018, Moniava and Nyuta Federmesser co-founded the Lighthouse Charity Foundation, a separate charitable foundation supporting hospice programs in Moscow and the Moscow Region. Moniava became its director. The foundation and the medical organization that operates the children's hospice both use the House with a Lighthouse name but are organizationally distinct.

The hospice's model centered on enabling seriously ill children to live at home with their families rather than remain in the hospital solely because of their care needs. Profiles and interviews described multidisciplinary home visits, the provision of medical equipment and supplies, training for parents, pain management, psychological and social support, and respite care for family caregivers. The organization also developed educational, recreational, and social programs intended to reduce the isolation of patients and their families and allow children to participate in ordinary daily activities.

Moniava described home and family life as central to her understanding of pediatric palliative care. She argued that palliative care should address not only end-of-life needs but also pain management, mobility, communication, education, and family life throughout a child's care. Independent profiles likewise described the later inpatient facility as supplementing, rather than replacing, the broader home-based service.

=== Inpatient hospice ===
The House with a Lighthouse inpatient facility on Dolgorukovskaya Street in Moscow opened in October 2019. A Tatler profile published the following year reported that the facility was then operating as a day center providing social and psychological services while awaiting the medical license required for full inpatient operation. The planned inpatient service included short stays to adjust treatment, train relatives in providing care, and provide respite for family caregivers, while home-based care remained the main framework of the hospice's work.

== Access to medicines and palliative care advocacy ==
Access to pain relief and other medicines became a recurring part of Moniava's public advocacy. Accounts of the early development of the children's hospice described families whose seriously ill children could leave the hospital but faced difficulty obtaining adequate pain relief, medical equipment for home use, and professional palliative care.

In 2019, Moniava and House with a Lighthouse became publicly involved in a dispute over access to anticonvulsant medicines prescribed to seriously ill children but not registered for use in Russia. In July and August, mothers of children who needed the anticonvulsant clobazam, sold under the brand name Frizium, were detained or investigated after obtaining the medicine from abroad. The hospice publicized the cases, and Moniava spoke about the difficulty families faced in obtaining such medicines through legal channels in Russia.

The hospice collected information about children who needed medicines that were not registered for use in Russia. In September 2019, the Russian government allocated federal funds for centralized purchases and imports of several unregistered psychotropic and anticonvulsant medicines for children. The hospice later raised concerns about the lack of clear instructions for families seeking access to the medicines. The Health Ministry published guidance on the procedure in October.

In December 2020, the Lighthouse Charity Foundation faced administrative proceedings over its record-keeping for controlled medicines. On 10 December, Moscow's Zyuzinsky District Court fined the foundation 200,000 rubles for record-keeping errors involving controlled medicines. On 14 December, the Moscow City Court overturned the fine and terminated the administrative proceedings. The proceedings were brought against the Lighthouse Charity Foundation, not Moniava personally.

== Disability inclusion and deinstitutionalization ==
During the first wave of the COVID-19 pandemic in 2020, staff of House with a Lighthouse arranged for six children receiving palliative care to move from Moscow residential institutions into private homes, partly because of the risks posed by COVID-19 in institutional settings. Moniava took a 12-year-old boy known publicly as Kolya into her home; he had spent his childhood in a residential institution. She initially cared for him under a temporary arrangement and later obtained legal guardianship.

The guardianship became the subject of public debate over disability inclusion and acceptable risk. Moniava sought to have Kolya attend school and took him on outings and trips, while drawing attention to barriers faced by wheelchair users on public transport and in the built environment. She argued that disability should not in itself prevent a person from attending school, traveling, or participating in ordinary social life.

Her approach also drew criticism. Lawyer Stalina Gurevich complained to guardianship authorities and argued that some activities Moniava arranged for Kolya exposed him to unnecessary risks. In a January 2021 commentary in Novaya Gazeta, journalist Elena Kostyuchenko challenged that view and framed the controversy as a broader question of whether people with profound disabilities should have equal access to education and public life. A January 2021 guardianship inspection found no violations in Kolya's care, and Moscow's social-protection department said that he was receiving the care and support he required.

Kolya died in January 2022. Subsequent reporting revisited criticism of Moniava in the broader context of pediatric palliative care and disability inclusion.

Beyond the guardianship case, disability inclusion remained part of Moniava's work. Forbes Woman reported in 2024 that House with a Lighthouse was working to improve school access and accessibility for seriously ill children and had launched a supported living program for young adults moving out of residential institutions.

== Humanitarian and civic activities ==
=== Earlier civic activity ===
In March 2012, while working on the children's program of the Vera Hospice Charity Fund, Moniava initiated an open letter to Patriarch Kirill asking him to intercede for the release from pre-trial detention of members of the feminist punk group Pussy Riot. She told Radio Free Europe/Radio Liberty that she believed the church should respond to the group's protest with mercy rather than by supporting the women's imprisonment.

=== Refugee aid ===
After the beginning of the Russian invasion of Ukraine in February 2022, Moniava helped organize volunteer assistance in Moscow for people displaced by the war who had arrived in Russia. The Goethe-Institut reported that volunteers initially came together informally and that the initiative was formalized as a separate charity later in 2022. Kommersant reported that the volunteer group began operating in March 2022; the charitable foundation for refugee assistance was registered that autumn and began full operations in November.

The organization provided food and clothing, helped people obtain medicines, arranged medical consultations, and assisted families with other practical needs while they settled in Moscow and the surrounding region. It was a separate organization from both the children's hospice and the Lighthouse Charity Foundation. In a 2024 interview with the Moskauer Deutsche Zeitung, Moniava said that the refugee foundation had its own budget, staff, and donor base and that money donated to the hospice was not used for refugee assistance. The refugee aid foundation suspended its work in September 2025.

== Opposition to the invasion of Ukraine ==
Following Russia's full-scale invasion of Ukraine in February 2022, Moniava publicly opposed the war. Reuters described her as an outspoken critic of the invasion and reported that she had called the war a crime that should end. In August 2024, speaking at the Meeting for Friendship Among Peoples in Rimini, Italy, she apologized to Ukrainians for the actions of her country and described war as incompatible with the values of hospice care.

=== Administrative prosecution ===
In January 2026, administrative proceedings were initiated against Moniava under Part 1 of Article 20.3.3 of the Russian Code of Administrative Offenses, which penalizes what Russian law terms the "discrediting" of the Russian Armed Forces. On 27 February, Moscow's Izmaylovsky District Court found her liable under the provision and fined her 45,000 rubles. Amnesty International reported that the case concerned three posts on her Telegram channel, including posts about the war and reports of strikes on Kryvyi Rih and Sumy.

After the fine, Moniava said that she did not plan to leave Russia because of her work with children requiring palliative care, but that she could not remain silent as if there were no war.

=== Criminal prosecution ===
On 2 September 2026, investigators searched Moniava's home in Moscow and took her to the Investigative Committee of Russia for questioning. Later that day, she was charged and detained.

She was charged under paragraph (d) of Part 2 of Article 207.3 of the Russian Criminal Code with publicly disseminating information about the Russian Armed Forces that investigators alleged she knew to be false. The Investigative Committee also alleged that the publication was motivated by political hatred. Moniava denied the charge. She faced a maximum sentence of ten years' imprisonment.

According to Moniava's lawyer, Mikhail Biryukov, the case concerned a Telegram post that she published on 24 February 2023, the first anniversary of the full-scale invasion of Ukraine. The Investigative Committee alleged that the post contained knowingly false statements about Russian military actions against Ukrainian civilians.

Following the charge, Moniava was held in a temporary detention facility pending a hearing on the investigators' request to place her in pre-trial detention. On 3 September, the Simonovsky District Court of Moscow imposed a pre-trial measure known as a "ban on certain actions" until 30 October rather than ordering pre-trial detention. The order barred her from leaving home between 8 p.m. and 8 a.m., using the internet, and communicating with witnesses in the case. She was released from custody after the hearing.

The Lighthouse Charity Foundation said that no investigative actions had been taken against the organization itself and that its work would continue while the case against Moniava proceeded. Amnesty International described Moniava's detention and prosecution as an attack on freedom of expression. It called on the Russian authorities to end the criminal proceedings against her for peacefully expressing opposition to the war and to repeal Russian wartime censorship laws.

On 6 October 2026, Moniava's support group reported that the criminal case had been closed on the grounds that her actions did not constitute a criminal offense. The group cited Biryukov, who had been informed of the decision by an Investigative Committee investigator.

== Recognition ==
In 2014, Moniava received the RBC Prize in the Благотворитель года ("Philanthropist of the Year") category. Other nominees included Elizaveta Glinka and Konstantin Khabensky.

In 2019, she received an RBC Prize in the Менеджер в социальной сфере ("Manager in the Social Sector") category.

The Vladimir Vysotsky Charitable Foundation lists Moniava among the laureates of its Своя колея (Svoya koleya) award for the 2020–2021 cycle.

In 2024, Moniava won in the Лучший благотворительный проект ("Best Charitable Project") category of the Forbes Woman Mercury Awards for House with a Lighthouse.
