= Nikolay Krasilnikov =

Russian scientist and educator (1927–2020)

Nikolay Nikolayevich Krasilnikov
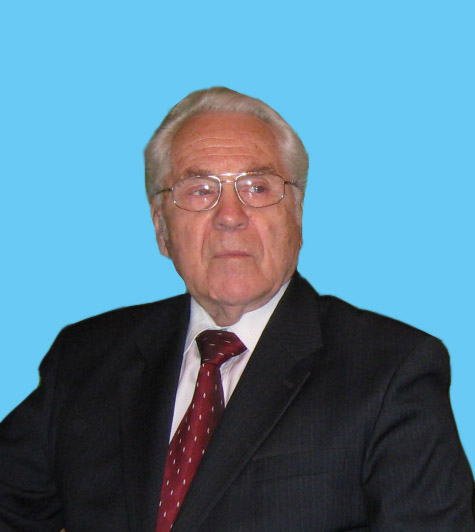
- Portrait of Nikolay Nikolayevich Krasilnikov
- Born: 22 January 1927; Irkutsk, USSR
- Died: 6 February 2020 (aged 93)
- Citizenship: Russian
- Education: Leningrad Polytechnic Institute
- Scientific career
- Fields: Human visual system Digital television Image compression Image processing
- Workplaces: Saint Petersburg State University of Aerospace Instrumentation

Nikolay Nikolayevich Krasilnikov (Russian: Красильников, Николай Николаевич, 22 January 1927 – 6 February 2020) was a Soviet and Russian scientist and educator in the fields of image transmission, image compression and human visual system.

== Education ==
Krasilnikov graduated from the Leningrad Polytechnic Institute in 1950. He earned his Candidate of Sciences (equal to PhD) degree in 1952 and Doctor of Sciences degree in 1963.

== Career ==
Krasilnikov has worked in Leningrad Institute of Aviation Instrumentation (now Saint Petersburg State University of Aerospace Instrumentation) since 1954. He was head of the Department of Radio transmitting and Television systems in 1957-1994. Under his leadership, department cooperated with leading institutions in USSR in the field of image processing and digital television. One of the first digital television systems in Europe was developed in cooperation with All-union Television Research Institute (Russian: Всесоюзный научно-исследовательский институт телевидения) in the beginning of the 1970s. As a scientist he developed functional model of human visual system, based on the conception of matched filtering and statistical theory of image transmission.

== Death ==
Nikolay Krasilnikov died on 6 February 2020, at the age of 93.

== Awards and recognition ==
- The Russian Federation Government Prize in education (2009)
