= Sergey Kuvaev =

Russian actor & model (born 1984)

- Сергей Куваев
- Born: July 19, 1984 (age 41); Zhukovsky, Moscow Oblast, Russian SFSR, Soviet Union
- Occupations: Actor, model, videoblogger
- Height: 1.90 m (6 ft 3 in)

Sergey Andreevich Kuvaev (Russian: Сергей Андреевич Куваев; Japanese: セルゲイ・アンドレーエヴィチ・クワエフ born July 19, 1984) is a Russian actor, model and videoblogger in Japan.

== Biography ==
Sergey Kuvaev was born in Zhukovsky, Moscow Oblast, Russia. He developed a great interest for Japanese culture while studying at college, and begun learning Japanese at the age of 25. He then moved to Japan and worked as a journalist, but also got success in acting and modeling. Because of his passion in acting and close to native Japanese language ability, he played many roles which required him to speak not just English or Russian, but also Japanese lines.

== Filmography ==
=== Films ===
Film
Year	Title	Role	Notes
2013	The Mole Song: Undercover Agent Reiji	Russian Mafia Member	
2014	In the Hero	Bodyguard	
2014	Judge!	Party Guest	uncredited
2014	The Next Generation -Patlabor-	Russian Gang Member	
2014	Mozu	Chelkov	TV miniseries
2014	Tōi Yakusoku – Hoshi ni Natta Kodomotachi	Soviet Soldier	
2014	Tokyo ni Olympics o Yonda Otoko	American Swimmer	
2015	Senryokugai Sōsakan	Lancelot	
2015	Dr. Rintarō	Boss Assistant	Episode #1.1
2015	Tōkyō Mukokuseki Shōjo	Soldier	
2015	Ouroboros	Yakuza Lawyer	post-production
2015	Red Cross: Onna Tachi no Akagami	Soviet Interpreter	Episode #1.2; (completed)
2015	Risk no Kamisama	Bar Brawler	Episode #1.5; post-production
2015	Everest: The Summit of the Gods	Andrew Irvine	post-production
2016	~Last Attack~ Hikisakareta Shima no Kioku	Andrew	post-production
2016	Solid Time		Short film

=== Miscellaneous crew ===
Film
Year	Title	Role	Notes
2015	Equals	Stand-in	

== YouTube ==
Sergey is also a video blogger. He makes videos in Russian about the life in Japan. He has a YouTube channel and more than 1,000,000 subscribers.
