= Arrest and imprisonment of Dmitry Ivanov =

Russian programmer and civil activist

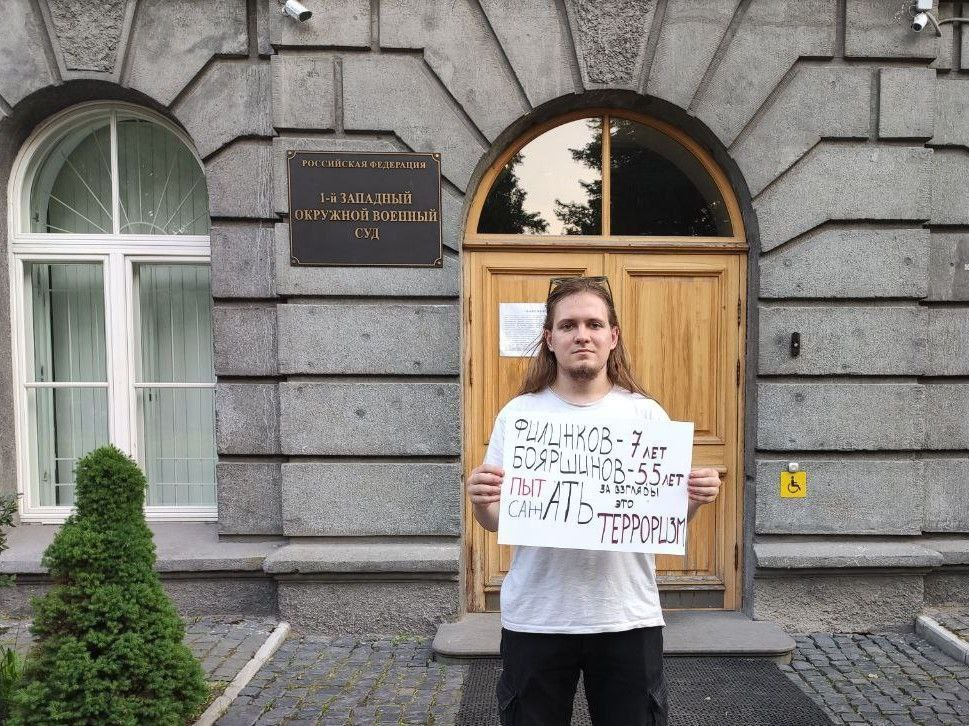

Dmitry Alexandrovich Ivanov (Russian: Дмитрий Александрович Иванов; born August 5, 1999, in Moscow) is a Russian programmer, civil activist, creator of the Telegram channel "Protest MSU”, and correspondent for For the human rights. On March 7, 2023, the Timiryazevsky Court in Moscow found Ivanov guilty under the fake news law and sentenced him to 8.5 years of imprisonment in a correctional facility.

As of 2023, Amnesty International has recognized Ivanov as a "prisoner of conscience”, and the Memorial Society has listed him among political prisoners in Russia.

== Early life and education ==
Dmitry Ivanov was born on August 5, 1999, in Moscow. In 2017, he enrolled at Lomonosov Moscow State University at the Faculty of Computational Mathematics and Cybernetics. His activities in politics led him in 2020 to take academic leave in his third year of study. On April 28, 2022, before graduation, he was arrested. During his trial, he sought leave to attend his exams which was refused and on July 1, 2022, he was expelled from Lomonosov Moscow State University as he had not successfully passed the state final certification.

== Political activity ==
Since 2017, Ivanov has taken part in participated in anti-government demonstrations and public campaigns, including for student Azat Miftakhov, programmer Konstantin Kotov, and those implicated in the New Greatness Case and the Network Case. He offered support to those detained at rallies and facilitated communication between detainees and their families by visiting police departments.

In 2018, Ivanov began an anonymous Telegram channel called "Protest MSU" to advocate student grievances. On December 16, 2018, Ivanov was detained by Alexei Okopny from the Centre for Combating Extremism, for taking photographs. Refusing to provide his phone password, the phone was destroyed and access to the Telegram channel was lost On December 17, 2018, he re-launched the Telegram channel under its original name, posting was about the torture he was subjected to, as well as information about himself, which lead to a surge in popularity. As a result, Ivanov faced frequent detentions at rallies, demonstrations, and upon leaving his house.

Following 2021 and the return and immediate arrest of Alexei Navalny to Russia, Ivanov was detained during a protest on February 2, 2021. On February 3, the Meshchansky Court sentenced him to 30 days of arrest. Ivanov was transferred to serve his detention at the Sakharovo Detention Center, in which he faced additional charges for shouting political slogans while detainees were walking. Prior to facing criminal prosecution, Ivanov spent 101 days under administrative arrest between 2020 and 2022.

In 2021, after his release from detention, Ivanov participated in the election campaign of Mikhail Lobanov, who was nominated by the Communist Party of the Russian Federation for a seat in the State Duma.

Following the Russian invasion of Ukraine, Ivanov participated in anti-war rallies.

== Criminal persecution ==
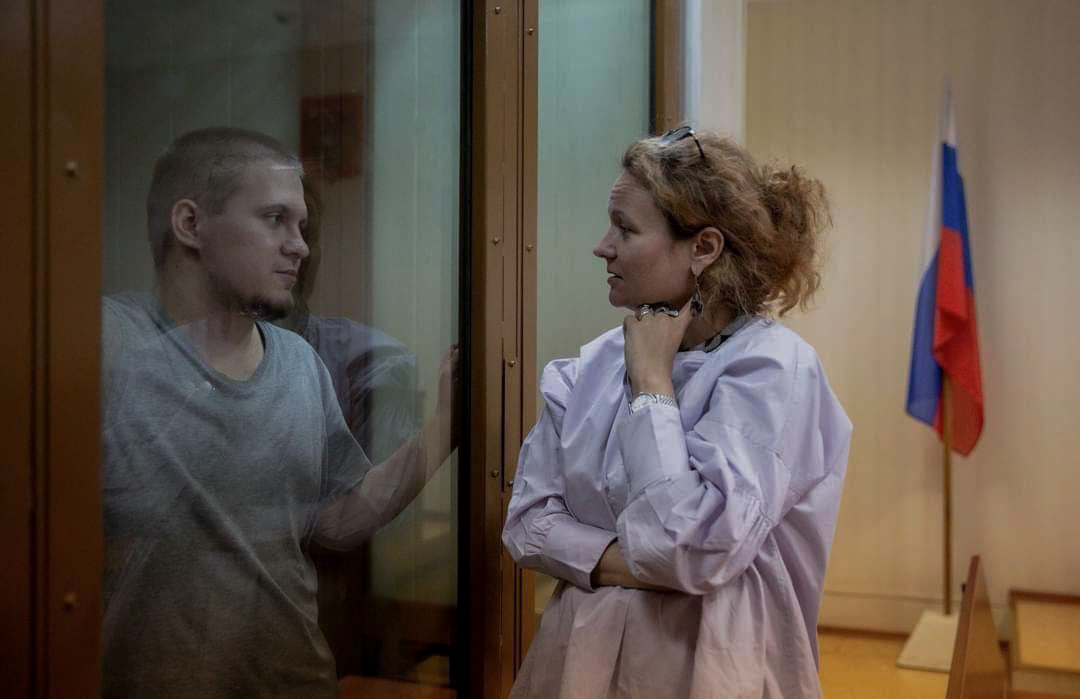
Ivanov in 2022

On April 28, 2022, he was arrested, and charged using evidence from one of his posts on the "Protest MSU" channel that implied his alleged involvement in organizing a protest. He was sent to serve his administrative arrest in the Sakharovo Center but after serving his 10-day sentence, was immediately re-arrested, and sentenced to an additional 25 days of detention for reposting content from the Telegram channel "Navalny"; he served this at the Special Reception Center No. 2 in the Khoroshyovo-Mnyovniki District.

On the evening of June 2, 2022, as Ivanov was scheduled to be released he was informed of further charges and the opening of a criminal case against him. His friends and his mother's apartments were searched and brought in for questioning, and detailed examinations of all "Protest MSU" posts undertaken. His pre-trail detention was extended to August 2, 2022. The court rejected Ivanov's appeals and his case was reclassified as an act committed without the involvement of other individuals, and his detention was extended to September 2, 2022, and again to February 3, 2023. On January 19, 2023, after a hearing, Ivanov was assaulted by an escort within the courthouse. The convoy threatened Ivanov with sexual violence. On March 7, 2023, the Timiryazevsky Court convicted Dmitry Ivanov of disseminating "false information about the Russian armed forces" and sentenced him to 8 1/2 years in a penal colony.

During 2022–2023, several public figures came forward to support Ivanov. Among them were Novaya Gazeta editor-in-chief and Nobel laureate Dmitry Muratov, journalist and reporter Andrei Loshak, journalist and film critic Anton Dolin, journalist and public figure Nikolai Svanidze, journalist Anton Orekh, politician Marina Litvinovich, former head of the Presidential Council for Civil Society and Human Rights Mikhail Fedotov, dissident and politician Valery Borshchyov, co-founder of the Yabloko party Vladimir Lukin, writer and journalist Leonid Nikitinsky, human rights activist and coordinator of the Russia Behind Bars Foundation Alla Frolova, actress Mariya Shalayeva, professor and academician Arutyun Avetisyan, former vice president and executive director of Transparency International Elena Panfilova, politician Konstantin Yankauskas, sociologist Grigory Yudin, film director Boris Khlebnikov, editor-in-chief of TV Rain channel Tikhon Dzyadko.

On July 15, 2022, the human rights organization "Memorial" recognized Dmitri Ivanov as a political prisoner. On March 7, 2023, Amnesty International also acknowledged him as a "prisoner of conscience".

As of July 2024, he was transferred to Corrective Colony No. 3 in Tambov Oblast.
