= Darya Kozyreva =

Russian anti-war activist

- Дарья Козырева
- Born: October 7, 2005 (age 20)

Darya Alexandrovna Kozyreva (Russian: Дарья Александровна Козырева; 7 October 2005) is a Russian anti-war activist. In April 2025, she was sentenced to two years and eight months in prison for "discrediting" the Russian Army.

== Activism ==
Kozyreva opposed the Russian invasion of Ukraine from its beginning in February 2022, and criticized the war on her social media. In March 2022, Kozyreva posted on VK against the Russian invasion of Ukraine and Russian censorship laws. She was in 10th grade at the time. In August 2022, she and her boyfriend were detained after tearing pro-war symbols off of military vehicles in Kronstadt; due to her status as a minor, she was not taken to court. In September 2022, she wrote against President Vladimir Putin's announcement of mobilization online, saying "Is it possible that this vile panopticon, the creatures sitting in the State Duma, the creatures that make up the government, the bastard president, have all lost the last remnants of their minds talking about mobilisation? Have they ever had a conscience or known fear?"

Early on the morning of 18 December 2022, Kozyreva spray painted a metal sculpture in St. Petersburg’s Palace Square commemorating the relationship between St. Petersburg and the Ukrainian city of Mariupol, writing "Murderers, you bombed it. Judas." She was arrested for the act on 19 December and "given a misdemeanor charge for 'discrediting' the army and a felony charge for intentionally damaging property". An investigation was opened against her for vandalism, but charges were not followed up on.

In December 2023, Kozyreva was charged with "discrediting the Armed Forces of the Russian Federation" for her March 2022 VK post. She pled not guilty to the charges, but said she stood by her post and would not delete it. In January 2024, she was expelled from Saint Petersburg State University, where she was studying medicine, due to her recent conviction.

=== 2024 arrest and detention ===
In February 2024, Kozyreva was arrested again after taping excerpts of Ukrainian poet Taras Shevchenko's writing to his statue. The excerpts, from Shevchenko's poem "My Testament", read "Oh bury me, then rise ye up / And break your heavy chains / And water with the tyrants’ blood /The freedom you have gained.". Her court hearing was not open to the public, but the court press reported that Kozyreva "maintains stable ties with opposition movements, including representatives outside the Russian Federation, acting in the interests of foreign states". Following the hearing she was sent to pretrial detention.

Kozyreva was kept in pretrial detention for nearly a year. While in detention, Kozyreva wrote a letter urging other Russians to speak out, noting that "When everyone overcomes their fear and speaks out, it will be time for Putin’s gang to be afraid. No evil lives forever, every dictatorship is bound to come to an end. It may collapse under its own weight, as the USSR did, or it may collapse because the people are finally rising up against it".

In August 2024, additional charges were brought against Kozyreva regarding an interview with Radio Free Europe in which she called Russia's invasion of Ukraine "monstrous" and "criminal".

Her trial began in October 2024 and continued into December. In February 2025, Kozyreva was released from pretrial detention into house arrest. In April 2025, she was sentenced to two years and eight months in prison, a shorter sentence than prosecutors had sought. She was released in March 2026 due count of pre-trial detention as 1.5 days per actual day served.
