= Masyanya =

Russian adult animated web series

Left to right: Masyanya, Lokhmaty and Hryundel from the episode "Russian Punk Rock" (2002).

Masyanya (Russian: Масяня) is a Russian adult animated web series created by Oleg Kuvaev with Macromedia Flash in 2001. The series features 9 seasons and 181 episodes as of now.

== Characters ==
=== Main cast ===
- Masyanya (Масяня Masânâ; real name Maria) - The title character and the eponymous heroine in her 20s who lives in an apartment in St. Petersburg. Masyanya has an oval-shaped head and always wears a miniskirt and a shirt with a bare midriff.
- Khryundel (Хрюндель Ǩrûndelʼ, Pigface; real name Alexander) - Masyanya's rather dense, good-natured, overall-clad boyfriend.
- Lokhmaty (Лохматый Lokhmatıĭ, Russian for "Shaggy"; real name Anton Lokhmatenko) - their friend, a pudgy and care-free drummer. Lokhmaty is later revealed to be of Ukrainian descent, his last name being Lokhmatenko.

=== Side cast ===
- Fyodorovna (Фёдоровна Fëdorovna) - Masyanya's mother. Given name and occupation are unknown. She is divorced.
- Lyaska (Ляська Lâs'ka; real name Olga) - a girl from Moscow and Masyanya's friend.
- Sanyok (Санёк Sanëk, a derivative of the full name Alexander) - homeless in a green sweater, who lives in the basement of Masyanya's apartment building.
- Dyadya Badya (Дядя Бадя Dâdâ Badâ) - son of Masyanya and Hryundel.
- Chuchunya (Чучуня Čučunâ) - daughter of Masyanya and Hryundel.
- Grisha Chaynikov (Гриша Чайников Griša Čaĭnikov) - music producer.
- Kolobukhin (Колобухин Kolobukhin) - bass guitar player.
- Putin (Путин Putin) - the president of Russia, often referred to as the czar.

== Episodes ==
A typical Masyanya episode is only a few minutes long. Each .swf episode was typically 170-400KB in size (though sometimes up to 3MB), and consisted mainly of sarcastic (and frequently absurd) commentary on contemporary Russian life. Some of the most popular episodes include one in which Masyanya and Hryundel' snicker and later hysterically laugh while Hryundel' is recording a jingle on the radio; another involves a sexual encounter made impossible by the lack of "shtuchki" (thingies), while yet another involves the two main characters exchanging a series of increasingly awful gifts, including a horse-shaped piñata and a bag of green cats.

The episodes are generally loosely connected and the characters initially did not age. For most of the episodes, no particular sequence or storyline could be established until recently as Masyanya and Hryundel now have two kids Uncle Badya and Chuchun. They can be watched in any order, but some episodes lose a great deal of their charm if one isn't familiar with at least some of the series' history.

== Soundtrack ==
Russian pop songs are often used in the soundtracks of episodes. Several episodes are, in essence, music videos set to a particular song.

== Reception ==
Masyanya's popularity is rapidly growing on both sides of the Atlantic. In Russia, Masyanya made the move from the Internet to television and can now be seen on several cartoons and talk shows, although its popularity is mainly supported by the Internet. In Germany, translations are being made of some of the more popular episodes. In the United States, Masyanya has become an integral feature of the Middlebury College Summer Russian Language Program in Vermont.

=== Censorship in Russia ===
At the height of the 2022 Russian invasion of Ukraine, the series broadcast episode 160 titled Vakidzasi (Вакидзаси; Wakizashi) on March 22, which was strongly critical of the war in Ukraine; the episode had featured graphic images taken from the conflict while also comparing president Vladimir Putin and his actions to that of Adolf Hitler's and stating that the only right decision Putin could make in his life would be to commit suicide. The episode ends on a happy note after Putin follows said advice in-universe. The show stayed the course with the next two episodes, 161 Kak ob'yasnit detyam (Как объяснить детям; How to explain [everything] to children) from May 13 in which Masyanya and Hryundel explain the circumstances leading to the war to their children Badya and Chuchunya, and 162 "Saint Mariuburg" (Санкт-Мариубург; Sankt-Mariuburg) from July 11 in which China invades Russia in the same manner as Russia did Ukraine in real life, and Saint Petersburg, where the episode takes place, is destroyed in the same manner as Mariupol.

In response, Russian media regulation agency Roskomnadzor, after having demanded the creators of Masyanya to pull the episode, banned the series after accusing the creators of circulating false information about the conflict. Kuvayev, who currently lives in Israel, had circumvented the take-down of the original webpage by creating a mirror site, but as of 2 April the authorities continue to threaten Kuvayev that all of his internet resources will be blocked unless he pulls the episode.
