= Oleg Kuvaev =

Russian artist, designer and animator (born 1967)

- Олег Куваев
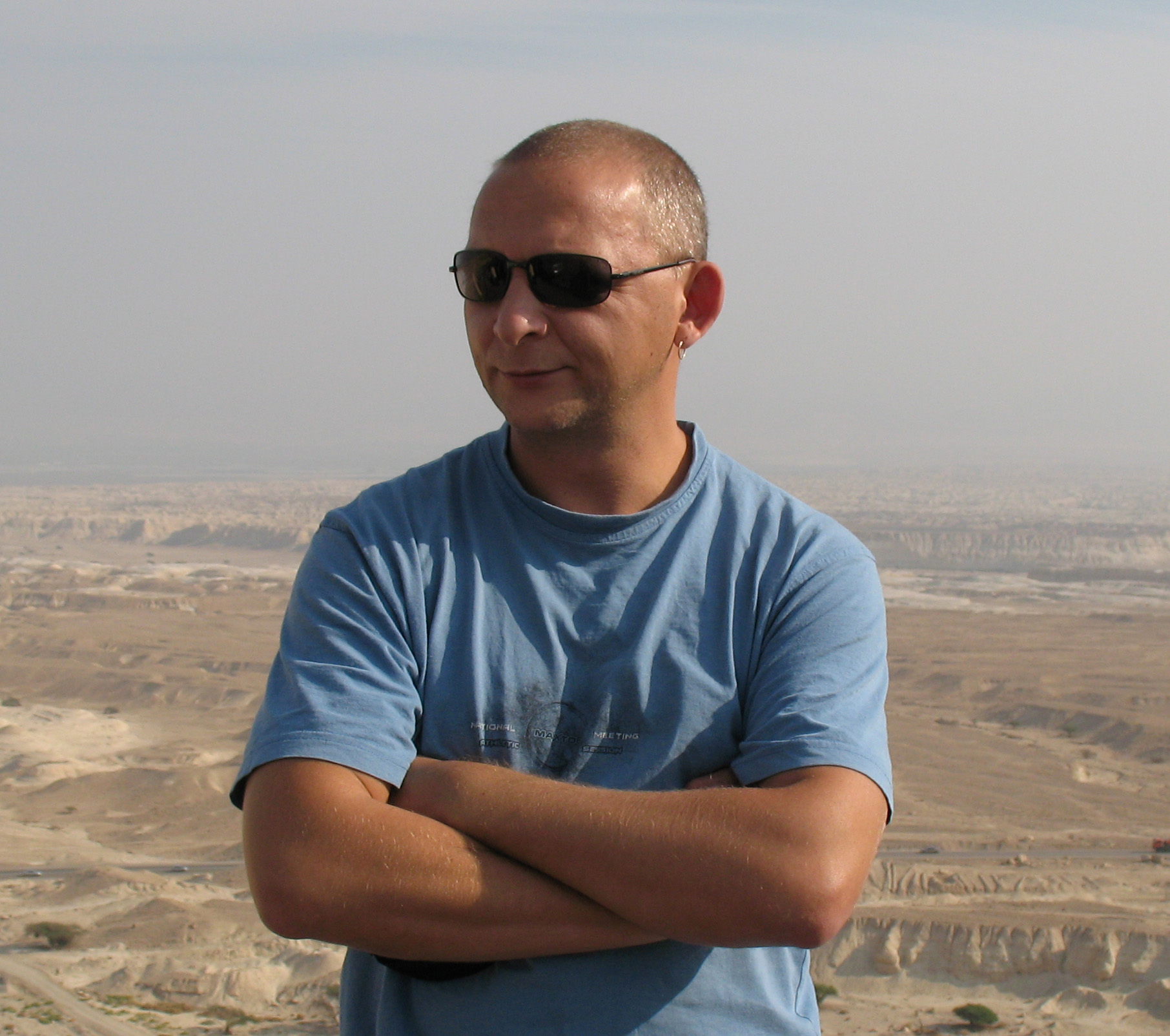
- Kuvaev in 2008
- Born: February 6, 1967 (age 59); Leningrad, USSR
- Citizenship: Russia; Israel
- Education: Leningrad Institute of Aviation Instrumentation
- Occupations: artist, designer, animator
- Notable work: Masyanya
- Website: multru.com

Oleg Igorevich Kuvaev (Russian: Олег Игоревич Куваев; born 6 February 1967) is a Russian-Israeli artist, designer and animator, known for his Masyanya flash-animated series. Since first appearing in the Russian Internet on October 22, 2001, "Masyanya" has become nearly a cult figure.

Kuvaev created the series by himself - he made up the characters and the stories, drew the flash-animated cartoons, recorded the sound, and uploaded the series (each of them about 3–4 minutes long) to the Internet.

== Biography ==
Oleg Igorevich Kuvaev was born on 6 February 1967 in Saint Petersburg (Leningrad). He studied first at a school specializing in the English language, then at school majoring in physics and mathematics. Afterwards, he studied at a number of higher learning institutions (including the Leningrad Institute of Aviation Instrumentation, Academy of Arts) and served in the Soviet Army. Later, he would work in a variety of professions and places, including as a painter and sculptor for more than 10 years, until the time of the "Big Worldwide Web" come.

From 1987 he was mainly into painting and sculpture, turning to computer graphics in 1997. Kuvaev worked as a designer in several studios, in the "computer gaming" industry as a 3D animator and modeler, web-designer, and java-programmer. In his free time he experimented with various computer technologies including freshly appearing vector animation (macromedia flash).

In 2001 he founded “Mult.ru” studio to create his flash-animated series Masyanya. Initially, the project started with ten short rough-made cartoons about a hooligan girl from Saint Petersburg, which would eventually become quite popular among the Russian-speaking community. This resulted in an epidemic of "masyanization" of the whole country, and the series' popularity is perhaps Kuvaev's greatest achievement. Full of fresh, indigenous humor (sometimes caustic and absurd but still kind at its core) the series about Masyanya appealed to the young generation whose life, interests, and problems they focused on, while simultaneously embodying an alternative to commercial mass-culture.

The popularity of Masyanya made Oleg Kuvaev expend much effort fighting for the copyright to his own creation between 2003–2005. Kuvaev was forced to fight in the forefront of struggling for copyright laws in Russia which was the stronghold of piracy at this time. Many Russian companies have illegally profited from Masyanya and, worse, have at times distorted the essence of the character. For example, Oleg Kuvaev had to apply to court to compel the closing of the shoddy commercial talk show At Masyanya’s broadcast at the Russian pop-music TV channel Muz-TV that was using this character illegally, without his permission. Oleg and his team have won three such trials on copyright proving that the "times are changing".

Until quite recently, Oleg Kuvaev worked as the art-director and owner of “Mult.ru” studio. Besides Masyanya, the studio has released three more animated cartoon series: Eji and Petrutchoe, Six and a Half and Magazinchik Boe. Just like Masyanya, they could be downloaded from the Internet free of charge and were translated in different TV-channels across Russia. Additionally, numerous advertising cartoons, illustrations, and even radio-shows were produced.

Masyanya brought the studio most of its income in the form of merchandise and mobile services. The studio received copyright charges from companies that used the brand. Ice cream, cookies, DVDs, T-shirts and much more merchandise with Masyanya’s brand were now produced legally. Mobile operators were selling pictures, videos and ring-tones from Masyanya, which brought in additional income. Despite this, suddenly, in the middle of 2006 Oleg Kuvaev closed all projects he was working on and left the studio and the country, with almost no response whatsoever to the other workers of Mult.ru.

In 2022, together with Russian rock band Nogu Svelo!, Kuvaev created the Anthem of the Doomed, an anti-war animated video dedicated to Russians who support the Russian invasion of Ukraine.

Now he lives in Ramat Gan, Israel, with his wife, Polina, and his son and daughter. All studio projects are closed except his first and favorite - Masyanya. As of 2008, there are more than 150 episodes of the cartoon in release. New episodes are still appearing made by Oleg Kuvaev himself. All of them are available on his website and YouTube channel.
