= List of trade unions in Russia =

This a list of trade unions in Russia.

== Active trade unions ==
- Alliance of Doctors
- Artists Trade Union of Russia
- Kontinental Hockey League Players' Trade Union

== Defunct trade unions ==
- All-Russian Teachers' Union, 1890s - 1918
- All-Russian Metalworkers Union
- Russian Theatrical Society
- Vikzhel

== Trade union groupings ==
- Confederation of Labour of Russia, formed in 1995, affiliated with the ITUC.
- Federation of Independent Trade Unions of Russia, formed in 1990, successor to the Soviet era trade unions system, affiliated with the ITUC until 2022 and the General Confederation of Trade Unions.
- Sotsprof, formed in 1989
- Union of Trade Unions of Russia, formed in 2010, affiliated with the World Federation of Trade Unions (WFTU)

=== Defunct trade unions groupings ===
- All-Russian Confederation of Labour, formed in 1995, affiliated with the International Trade Union Confederation (ITUC) and the General Confederation of Trade Unions. Ceased to exist after unification with the Confederation of Labor of Russia in 2010.
- National Union of Russian Trade Unions, the center of nationalist trade unions, which operated in the 1990s.
- Russian Confederation of Free Trade Unions
- Navalny's Trade Union — an association of trade unions affiliated with Alexey Navalny's Anti-Corruption Foundation. It was established in January 2019, and effectively ceased to exist in 2021.

== See also ==
- Trade unions in Belarus
- Trade unions in the Soviet Union
