= Nasiliu.net =

Russian nonprofit organization

- Насилию.нет
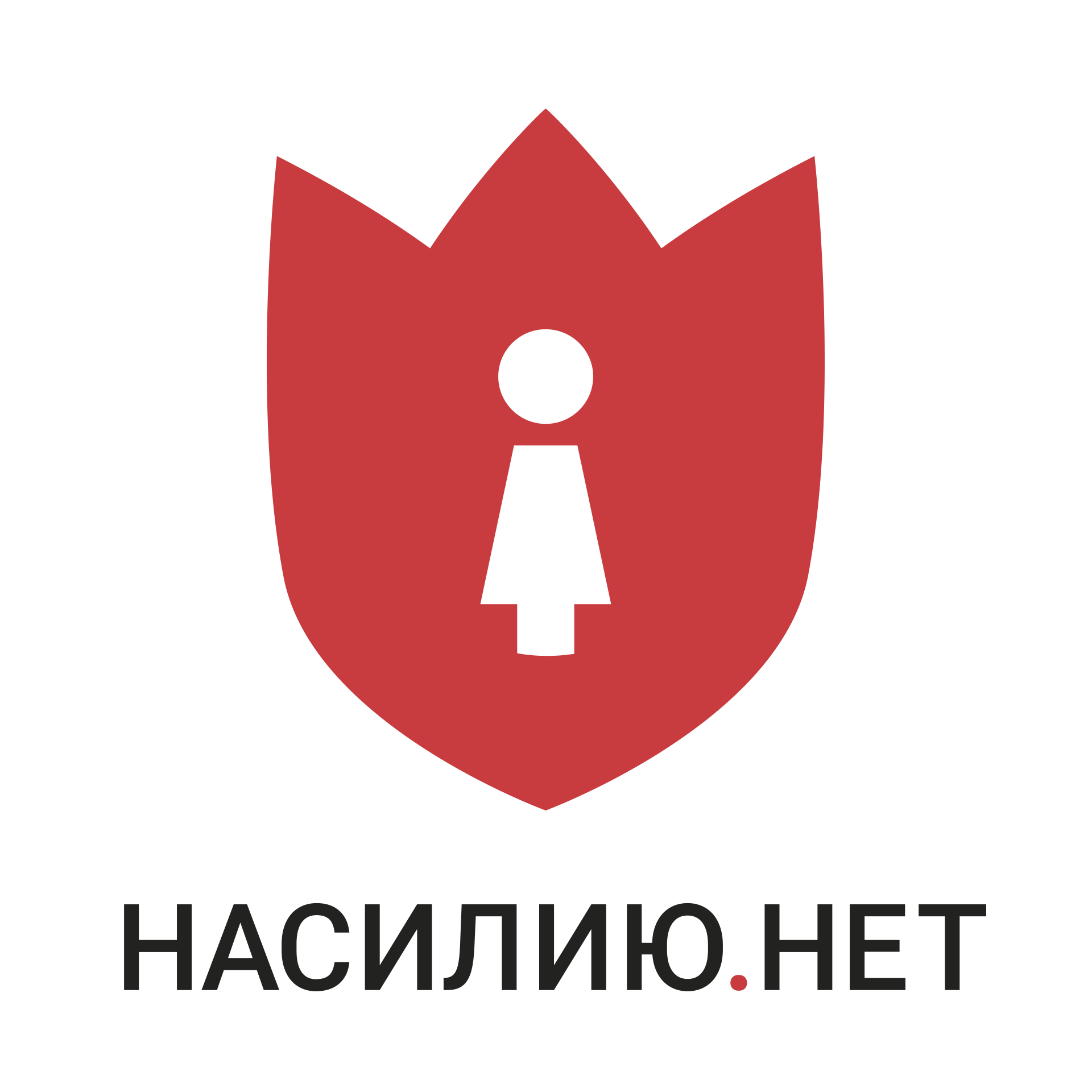
- Formation: 2015
- Location: Moscow, Russia
- Director: Anna Rivina
- Website: https://nasiliu.net

Nasiliu.net (Russian for “No To Violence”; full title: Center for Working with the Problem of Violence Nasiliu.net) is a Russian nonprofit organization founded in 2015. Nasiliu.net is one of the leading Russian organizations dealing with the problem of domestic violence. The goals of the center are to make the problem visible and provide free help for domestic violence survivors. The founder and director is the Russian human rights defender, PhD in Law Anna Rivina.

== History and activity ==
Nasiliu.net appeared as a media project in 2015: Anna Rivina started it as a volunteer initiative focusing on raising awareness on domestic violence.

In 2016 Nasiliu.net launched its website, which became Russia's first information portal on the domestic violence problem.

In the same year there appeared the N.N. mobile application with an SOS button — it was the first application for domestic violence survivors in Russia. N.N. enables users to urgently send a message with their geolocation to five email addresses and phone numbers, as well as provides relevant guidelines and a map of all the helping organizations in Russia. The Center regularly revises the map to make sure it contains up-to-date information. Since 2020 the application has also started operating on smart watches.

On April 18, 2018, the Russian Ministry of Justice registered the center as a nonprofit organization with the official name Center for Work with the Problem of Violence Nasiliu.net. Since 2018 the center has been providing targeted assistance to those who faced domestic violence.

In September 2019 the first office of Nasiliu.net was opened in Moscow. Since then the number of requests has been rapidly growing, so has the team.

In May 2020 Anna Rivina was included in the Forbes rating of the most successful young people "30 under 30" in the “social practices” category.

In December 2020 the Center started to face counteraction from the Russian state. The Russian Ministry of Justice declared Nasiliu.net to be a ”foreign agent”. what has created financial and media obstacles as well as bureaucratic hurdles. In February 2021 the Ministry of Justice threatened to dissolve the group entirely, alleging charter violations. That month Nasiliu.net received an unsigned demand, allegedly from the Federal Agency for State Property Management, to "urgently vacate the premises voluntarily". Their landlord subsequently showed up and told them to leave. In March 2021 the center's appeal to lift foreign agent status was denied by the Moscow Zamoskvoretsky District Court. In April 2021 Russian court fined the organization for infringing the foreign agent legislation. The situation repeated in May 2023.

Before that the center was cooperating with the Department of Labor and Social Protection and the Department of Media and Advertising to make a big campaign which was supported with a mayor's grant. It was called Moscow Against Domestic Violence. In the summer 2020 thousands of leaflets and posters appeared in all the social centers of Moscow. In September the Center organized panel discussions for lawyers, psychologists and employees of government and non-profit organizations. From October 2020 to January 2021 Nasiliu.net billboards were hung around Moscow. This cooperation ended abruptly after the center was added to the list of “foreign agents” on December 29, 2020.

However, Nasiliu.net continued working and expanding. In August 2021 the center launched a program to provide emergency accommodation for domestic violence survivors in Moscow.

In November 2021 Nasiliu.net launched a special program to help older people who were exposed to domestic violence.

In the following year the Center opened a coworking space for those who felt lonely and insecure during the COVID-19 pandemic.

On 1 December 2022 the new restrictions on “foreign agents” came into force in Russia. Among other things, the new version of the law banned “foreign agents” from holding any public events. The office had to move again, this time due to funding issues.

In January 2023 the center launched PRO Nasilie — the most comprehensive source of information on the problem of domestic violence in the Russian language.

On 10 February 2023 the Russian Ministry of Justice declared the founder and director of Nasiliu.net Anna Rivina to be a “foreign agent,” claiming that she distributed “false information about the activities of the Russian authorities and negative information about the Russian Ministry of Defense”.

On 1 June 2023 the Center started operating not only in-person in Moscow, as it was before, but also online across Russia.

In August 2023 the Center started working on a 24/7 basis to be available for domestic violence survivors from all the time-zones.

Now the Center gives free psychological, legal and HR-consultations, as well as organizes various support groups and art therapy classes. The psychologists of the center also work with aggressors who aim to renounce violence and change their way of coping with emotions. The center operates throughout Russia, but its SOS accommodation program is available in Moscow only.

Thousands of people have reached out for help throughout the years of activity of Nasiliu.net. These people are not only domestic violence survivors, but also witnesses and aggressors. The statistics can be found in the yearly reports on the center's website. For instance, since September 2022 to August 2023 the specialists of the Center helped 7816 times: this number includes individual consultations, groups of psychological support, SOS accommodation program, calls and communication through different channels.

From April 18, 2024, the center began helping Russian-speaking people around the world.

== Media ==
To raise awareness on domestic violence, the center and its founder Anna Rivina have had a large media presence. Nasiliu.net has done multiple projects and social advertising campaigns and has been actively working with public figures to speak out against domestic violence.

In 2017 the center launched the Men Against Violence campaign, in which Anton Dolin, Vasya Oblomov, Mikhail Labkovsky, Nikolai Svanidze, Fyodor Pavlov-Andreevich and other famous men took part.

In 2018 Nasiliu.net made a series of video instructions for domestic violence survivors with the participation of employees of specialized NGOs, lawyers, attorneys, psychologists and law enforcement officers.

In 2019 there were two media projects of Nasiliu.net: the social experiment Are Muscovites Ready to Help Domestic Violence Survivors Outside and the social video First Date.

In the same year Anna Rivina became an ambassador for the Levi's I shape my world campaign. There were posters with information on domestic violence and a QR code leading to the center's website in 80 Levi's stores across Russia. The initiative was also supported by bars, restaurants, urban spaces and educational institutions in Moscow and other Russian cities.

In 2020 Anna Rivina took part in the film What Did I Do To Help, which was produced by the TV anchor Regina Todorenko. After the film was released the center received a record number of requests for help and volunteering.

In summer 2020 Nasiliu.net launched a campaign in support of the Khachaturian sisters: video messages were made and posted by Irina Shikhman, Alexei Navalny, Nadezhda Tolokonnikova, Irina Prokhorova, Varvara Shmykova and other famous people who found it necessary to stand up for the girls who were tried for killing their father who had exposed them to violence for years.

Soon another media project was released with the support of UN Women — it was the social video Girls Are Such Girls. Among the participants of this project there was the theater director Zhenya Berkovich, the journalist Lena Kostyuchenko and the ex-State Duma deputy Oksana Pushkina.

In 2021 Anna Rivina became the first Russian woman whose photo was placed on the cover of the Time magazine. Before that, there had appeared a photo of Raisa Gorbacheva, but it was in the times of the Soviet Union, and a picture of the Pussy Riot group, which was an illustration — not a photo.
