= Faena =

Faena may refer to

- A term in Spanish-style bullfighting
- Faena Arts Center, in Buenos Aires, Argentina
  - Faena Hotel Buenos Aires
- Alan Faena (born 1963), Argentine hotelier and real estate developer
- Sebastian Faena (born 1990), Argentine filmmaker and fashion photographer
