= KTR =

KTR may refer to:

- Confederation of Labour of Russia
- Cretaceous Terrestrial Revolution
- Keerbergs Transport Racing, a Belgian auto racing team
- Keio Corporation or Keio Teito Electric Railway, Tokyo, Japan
- Kendallville Terminal Railway (reporting code), Indiana, U.S.
- Kesteren railway station (station code), in Neder-Betuwe, Netherlands
- Kingstree (Amtrak station) (station code), South Carolina, US
- Kitakinki Tango Railway, Japan
- Korea Testing & Research Institute
- K. T. Rama Rao (born 1976), Indian politician
- RAAF Base Tindal (IATA code), Katherine, Northern Territory, Australia
- Klon KTR overdrive pedal, redesign of the Klon Centaur
