= VKT =

VKT may refer to:

- VKT-line, a Finnish defence line during World War II
- All-Russian Confederation of Labour (Всероссийская конфедерация труда), a Russian trade union federation 1995–2010
- Valtion Kivääritehdas, a Finnish state-owned firearms manufacturer 1926–1946
- Vestfold Kollektivtrafikk, the public transport authority for Vestfold, Norway
- Vorkuta Airport (IATA code), Komi Republic, Russia
