= Fyodor Pavlov-Andreevich =

Russo-Brazilian artist and theater director (born 1976)

- Born: April 14, 1976 (age 50); Moscow, Russia
- Occupations: Artist, curator, theatre director
- Known for: Performance art, site-specific art, interactive art, endurance art, sculpture, video art, photography, installation art
- Website: http://fyodorpavlovandreevich.com/

Fyodor Pavlov-Andreevich (Russian: Фёдор Па́влов-Андрее́вич, April 14, 1976, Moscow, Russia) is a Russian-Brazilian artist, curator, and theater director.

== Early life and education ==
Pavlov-Andreevich was born in Moscow to film historian Boris Pavlov and writer Lyudmila Petrushevskaya. He is the great-grandson of the linguist Nikolay Yakovlev, and the great-great-grandson of the Ukrainian Jewish revolutionary Ilya Weger.

He graduated with MA in European literature from Moscow State University's department of journalism in 1999.

Pavlov-Andreevich first made a name for himself in the 1990s as a young journalist and presenter for Russian print and television outlets. At the end of the 1990s, he began producing projects in the contemporary culture sector.

From the 2000s onward, he has worked as a theater director, performance artist, and curator. He lives between São Paulo and London.

== Career ==
=== Theatre ===
In 2002, Pavlov-Andreevich made his theatrical debut with "BiFem", based on the play by Lyudmila Petrushevskaya. In 2003, the play received the New Word ("Novoe slovo") award at the New Drama ("Novaya drama") Festival. In 2004, it made its international debut at the ICA London in 2004.

Among his other theatrical works are 'Old Women' ('Staroukhy'), a thirty-minute experimental opera based on the Daniil Kharms story that was nominated for two Golden Mask awards in 2010; and 'Andante', a 'dramatic dance' production based on another play by Petrushevskaya, first performed at the Meyerhold Centre in 2016.

=== Contemporary art ===
Since the end of the 2000s, Pavlov-Andreevich has worked in the field of contemporary art. He has collaborated with Marina Abramović, Serpentine Gallery director Hans-Ulrich Obrist, and Neue Nationalgalerie director Klaus Biesenbach, and Performa founder and director RoseLee Goldberg. Marina Abramović once said on Pavlov-Andreevich’s practice: "His art is capable of surprising us with ever new ways of seeing the world we live in." Pavlov-Andreevich's solo presentations have been shown at the Garage Museum of Contemporary Art (Moscow), the Künstlerhaus (Vienna), Faena Arts Center (Buenos Aires), the CCBB Cultural Center (Brasilia), Deitch Projects (New York City), ICA (Institute of Contemporary Arts, London), MAC USP Museum and SESC Cultural Center (both São Paulo), among the others.

==== Performance ====
Emerging in the live art scene during the 2000s as a pioneering advocate of a new guerrilla aesthetic, Fyodor Pavlov-Andreevich employs performance, sculpture, film, installation, and writing to explore transformations of the intimate realms into impersonal and public domains. His work investigates the ways in which ritualised play of the material body—the physical substance of our being—transforms into immaterial resonance through the dynamics of relational experiences.

Pavlov-Andreevich earned international recognition thanks to one of his guerrilla performances, 'The Foundling', in which a nude Pavlov-Andreevich, encased in a glass box, was literally thrown into a series of society events without their organizers' permission. Among them were the gala opening of the new building of the Garage Museum of Contemporary Art in Moscow, a dinner by French patron François Pinault at the Venice Biennale, and the Met Gala in New York. During the performance at the Met Gala on May 2, 2017, he was arrested by New York City police for trespassing on private property and public nudity, then sent to Central Booking prison, where he spent 24 hours.

His series of performances, Temporary Monuments (2014–2017), along with solo shows by the same name at Moscow's Pechersky Gallery (2016) and the Museum of Contemporary Art at the University of São Paulo (2017), was dedicated to the problem of contemporary slavery in Brazil and Russia. In each of the seven performances in the series, the artist immersed himself in the conditions which slaves were (or are) forced to endure. In one of them (Pau de Arara), he submits himself to a type of medieval torture still used by the Brazilian police's special forces; in another (O Tigre), he performs a Brazilian slave ritualistic punishment, in which a person must cross Rio de Janeiro while carrying a basket of sewage on their head.

Pavlov-Andreevich's artistic practice focuses on three subjects: the distance between the spectator and the work of art in performance, the temporality and vulnerability of the human body, and the connection between the sacred and the obscene.

British art historian Adrian Heathfield described Pavlov-Andreevich's practice as follows: ‘Fyodor is making powerful work in a performance art lineage that deals with power, bodies and participation. He’s also something of brilliant interventionist – his Foundling performances have caused quite a stir.’

==== Curatorial practice ====
Beginning the 2000s, Pavlov-Andreevich served as director of the Solyanka State Gallery in Moscow, the country's first gallery dedicated to live art.

== Political protests and activism ==
Fyodor Pavlov-Andreevich’s body of work speaks to his vocal opposition to authoritarian states, repressive policies, and systemic injustices across Eastern Europe, and South America. His work contributes to cross-cultural conversations on the intersectionality of LGBTQI+ identities, post-colonialism, anti-war activism, and human rights across diverse creative media. Themes of social justice and political activism are central to his practice.

He resigned from Solyanka following the forced cancellation of a solo exhibition by artist/activist Katrin Nenasheva (2018) which was banned from opening by the state authorities.

Temporary Monument № 0 (2018): This live performance was created in response to the oppressive actions of Chechen authorities targeting the LGBTQI+ community. The artist's body was wrapped in a rug, evocative of Chechen funeral ceremonies, and suspended from the exterior wall of a building in London’s Mayfair district for a duration of five hours.

The Sharp Rocks (2021): a three-hour performance by Fyodor Pavlov-Andreevich at the corner of Rua Oscar Freire and Rua Augusta in São Paulo. Seated nude and motionless on rocks used by the city to deter the homeless, the artist staged a silent protest highlighting the role of contemporary art in addressing social exclusion and vulnerable communities.

In April 2021, prominent Russian YouTuber and journalist Yuri Dud conducted an interview with Fyodor Pavlov-Andreevich, which has since garnered over 4 million views. Dud, who is included in Russia’s official registry of "foreign agents" for his journalistic work, was subsequently fined 120,000 rubles by a Moscow court in July 2022 under the administrative charge of "gay propaganda".

Since the onset of the Russian invasion of Ukraine, Pavlov-Andreevich has been a vocal critic of Putin's political aggression, dedicating his work to support Ukraine and its defenders.

My Flag Is Red (2022) is a live performance by Fyodor Pavlov-Andreevich in support of the Ukrainian people and their pursuit of freedom. The long red flag, adorned with large handwritten letters reading “Blue Yellow”, is emblematic of the ongoing conflict. It takes on a new significance in the context of the war, symbolising resistance and the unwavering spirit of those who stand against oppression.

The Tall Fence (2024) is a live performance by Fyodor Pavlov-Andreevich for the Rio Carnival, dedicated to artists and 1,011 political prisoners who’ve been placed behind bars in Russia under Vladimir Putin’s regime for their opposition to the government and the war in Ukraine. The Tall Fence embodies solidarity with those who have been silenced for expressing dissent.

== Works in collections ==
- Museu de Arte do Rio, Rio de Janeiro, Brazil
- Moscow Museum of Modern Art, Moscow, Russia
- Blavatnik Family Foundation, New York, USA
- Instituto Inclusartiz, Rio de Janeiro, Brazil
- Design Museum, London, UK

== Selected solo shows and performances ==
=== 2024 ===
- Antimobília, solo show, SESC São Paulo

=== 2023 ===
- Antifurniture, solo show, London Design Museum

=== 2021 ===
- Humble Works, three-artists show (with Marina Abramović and Nico Vascellari). Colnaghi, London
- The 44 Cards, performance, as part of ‘Adventures Of The Body’ solo show. Ground Solyanka Gallery, Moscow
- The Sharp Rocks, performance. São Paulo

=== 2019 ===
- Decorative Sacredness, solo show. Gazelli Art House. London

=== 2018 ===
- The 42 Cards, performance, 32º Festival de Arte de Porto Alegre. Porto Alegre
- O Batatodromo, performance, as a part of group show Do Disturb. Palais de Tokyo, Paris
- Temporary Monument №0, performance, as a part of group show. Gazelli Art House, London

=== 2017 ===
- Fyodor's Performance Carousel-3, site specific installation in collaboration with 7 performance artists. Sesc Consolação, São Paulo
- Adventures of the Body, solo show. Baró Galeria, São Paulo
- Temporary Monuments, solo show. MAC-USP, São Paulo

=== 2016 ===
- Temporary Monuments, solo show. Pechersky Gallery, Moscow
- Foundling-4, guerrilla intervention. Bienal de São Paulo, São Paulo
- Fyodor's Performance Carousel-2, site specific installation in collaboration with 8 performance artists, curated by Felicitas Thun-Hohenstein. Künstlerhaus, Vienna
- A Portrait with the Artist and Void, a long durational performance. Museu de arte moderna (MAM-SP), São Paulo

=== 2015 ===
- Pyotr & Fyodor, 24-hour performance conversation with artist Pyotr Bystrov, curated by Daria Demekhina and Anna Shpilko. Solyanka State Gallery, Moscow
- O Batatodromo, solo show, curated by Marcello Dantas. Centro Cultural Banco do Brasil, Brasilia
- Foundling-3, guerrilla intervention. Christie's Vanity Fair Party, London
- Os Caquis (The Persimmons), performance, curated by Bernardo Mosqueira. EAV Parque Lage, Rio de Janeiro
- Foundling-2, guerrilla intervention. Garage Museum of Contemporary Art opening, Moscow
- Foundling-1, guerrilla intervention. Venice Biennale gala dinner, Fondation Pinault, Palazzo Cini, Venice

=== 2014 ===
- Fyodor's Performance Carousel-1, site specific installation in collaboration with 8 performance artists. Faena Arts Center, Buenos Aires

=== 2013 ===
- Laughterlife, site specific installations, sculptures, performance, curated by Marcio Harum, commissioned by Centro Cultural São Paulo. Casa Modernista, São Paulo
- Walk Away Until I Stay, performance, part of The Two Rings series. MKAD, Moscow
- Empty Bus, performance, part of The Two Rings series. Garden Ring, Moscow

=== 2012 ===
- Walk on My Shame, installation and performance, curated by Kathy Grayson, in collaboration with Matthew Stone, as part of New-Revisions, Frieze Week. NEO Bankside, London

=== 2011 ===
- Photobody, solo show, as part of Non-Stage, Istanbul Biennale. Commissioned by Galerie Non, Istanbul

=== 2010 ===
- The Great Vodka River, mixed-media installation and performance, curated by Katya Krylova. Presented by Luciana Brito Galeria as part of Art Public, curated by Patrick Charpenel at Art Basel Miami Beach, Miami

=== 2010 ===
- My Water Is Your Water, mixed-media installation and performance, curated by Maria Montero. Luciana Brito Galeria (under the framework of Bienal de São Paulo), São Paulo
- Egobox, performance, co-curated by Klaus Biesenbach and Roselee Goldberg. Garage Center for Contemporary Culture, Moscow
- Flick Me on My Memory, performance. Galerie Volker Diehl, Berlin
- Whose Smell Is This?, site specific installation and performance. The Armory Show, Volta art fairs, New York City

=== 2009 ===
- A Portrait with the Artist and Child, performance. Galerie Stanislas Bourgain, Paris
- Hygiene, performance. Deitch Projects, New York City
- I Eat Me, solo show. Paradise Row Gallery, London

=== 2008 ===
- Hunger Meditation, mixed media installation, 3-channel video and performance. Galerie Stanislas Bourgain, Paris

== Selected group shows ==
=== 2017 ===
- Pieter Bruegel. A Topsy-Turvy World, curated by Antonio Geuza. Artplay Design Center, Moscow

=== 2015 ===
- Trajetórias em Processo, curated by Guilherme Bueno. Galeria Anita Schwartz, Rio de Janeiro

=== 2013 ===
- Artists' Zoo. Solyanka State Gallery, Moscow
- Our Darkness, curated by Viktor Neumann. Laznia Centre for Contemporary Art, Gdansk, Poland

=== 2011 ===
- 9 Days, curated by Olga Topunova. Solyanka State Gallery, Moscow

=== 2009 ===
- Play: A Festival of Fun, curated by Lauren Prakke and Nick Hackworth. Paradise Row Gallery, London
- Marina Abramović Presents, curated by Hans Ulrich Obrist and Maria Balshaw. Manchester International Festival, Whitworth Gallery, Manchester

=== 2008 ===
- At Play 1. South Hill Park, London
- Laughterlife. Paradise Row Gallery, London
- Spazi Aperti. Romanian Academy, Rome

== Selected theatre projects ==
=== 2019 ===
- (July and November) – Jélena. Praktika Theatre, Moscow

=== 2017 ===
- Jélena. Praktika Theatre, Moscow

=== 2016 ===
- Andante. Meyerhold Centre, Moscow

=== 2015 ===
- Three Tricks of Silence. Meyerhold Centre, Moscow

=== 2013–2014 ===
- Tango-Quadrat. Meyerhold Centre, Moscow

=== 2012 ===
- Bakari. A.R.T.O. Theatre, Moscow
- The Rescue. The Lyric Theatre, London

=== 2010 ===
- Staroukhy. Barents Spektakel Festival, Kirkenes, Norway; also performed at Baibakov Art Projects, Moscow

=== 2008 ===
- Elizaveta Bam. Theatro Technis, London

=== 2004 ===
- BiFem. Institute of Contemporary Arts, London

== Literature ==
- Rolls-Bentley, Gemma (2024). Queer Art. The Quarto Group. ISBN 9780711282674.
