= Alexander Kabanov =

Alexander Kabanov may refer to:

- Aleksandr Kabanov (1948–2020), Soviet and Russian water polo player and head coach of the Russian water polo team
- Alexander Kabanov (chemist) (born 1962), Russian and American chemist
