= Navalny's Trade Union =

Navalny's Trade Union is a Russian association of trade unions, the creation of which was announced on January 24, 2019 by politician Alexei Navalny to "fight for fair wages." It includes an "Alliance of Doctors", an "Alliance of Teachers", and a trade union by the name of "People of Culture".

In September 2021, the chairman of the Alliance of Doctors, Anastasia Vasilyeva, announced that the union was no longer associated with Anti-Corruption Foundation and Navalny's projects.
