= Evgeniy Ponasenkov =

Russian historian and media personality

- Евгений Понасенков
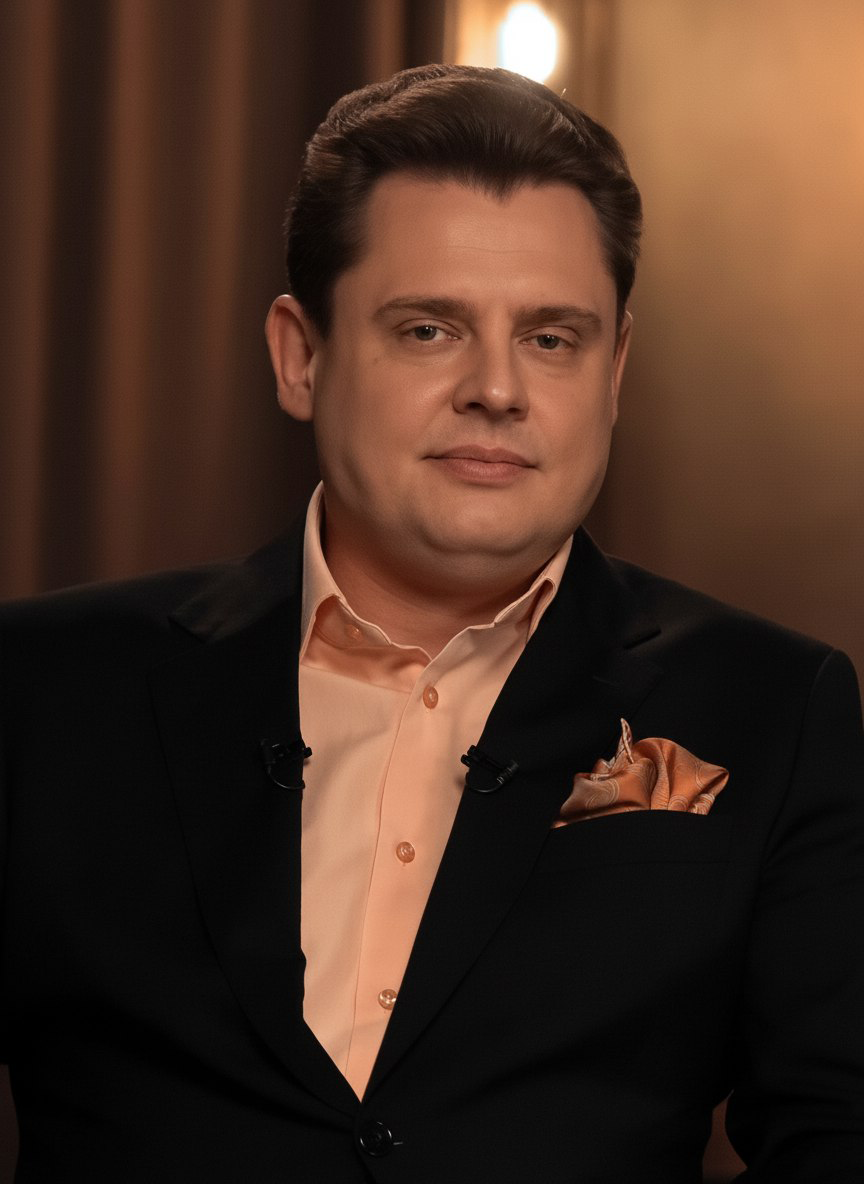
- Ponasenkov in 2022
- Born: Evgeniy Nikolayevich Ponasenkov; 13 March 1982 (age 44); Moscow, Russian SFSR, USSR
- Education: MSU Faculty of History (Not finished)
- Known for: Author of two historical monographs about the Napoleonic era
- Scientific career
- Fields: History

Evgeniy (Note: Sometimes transcribed to English as Eugene or Yevgeny) Nikolayevich Ponasenkov (Russian: Евгений Николаевич Понасенков; born 13 March 1982) is a Russian publicist and media personality. He has written about the Napoleonic era in Russia and is the author of two historical monographs. His second monograph "The First Scientific History of the War of 1812" (Russian: «Первая научная история войны 1812 года») became a bestseller. Ponasenkov himself has no historical education, and his work is criticized by the absolute majority of Russian historians.

== Biography ==
=== Career ===
From 2003 to 2010, Ponasenkov was presenter of the author's columnist for Kommersant Vlast, Russia's most important political weekly.

Since 2004, he has regularly given concerts as a compère, vocalist, and reciter of poetry and prose.

In March 2006, the premiere of his play, The German Saga (Russian: Немецкая Сага), took place at the Meyerhold Theater and Cultural Center, Moscow.

In 2008, Ponasenkov directed the classical music programme of the House of Olympic Friends (Russian: Дом друзей Олимпиады), the cultural centre of the Russian delegation at the Olympic Games in Beijing.

In 2009, opera singer Elena Obraztsova invited him to direct the celebration of her jubilee with theatrical performances in the Bolshoi Theatre and the Column Hall of the House of Unions.

In June 2010, Ponasenkov performed the main male role in a theatrical production based on his own play The Last Tango of Lili Marleen (Russian: Последнее танго Лили Марлен) in the Moscow International House of Music.

In 2012, the premiere of his feature documentary, The Mystery of the Bay of Naples (Italy, 105 min, 2012; Russian: Мистерии Неаполитанского залива, Italian: Misteri del golfo di Napoli), took place directed by Ponasenkov at the invitation of the Italian government.

Since January 2013, he has been the presenter of the author's programme about world cinema on Moscow. Trust (Russian: Москва. Доверие).

Since June 2013, he has been the author and co-host of the series "The Dramaturgy of History" (Russian: Драматургия истории) on the Saint Petersburg TV channel "Your Public Television!" (Russian: Ваше общественное телевидение!).

On 1 April 2022, the Russian Ministry of Justice added Ponasenkov to the register of media outlets designated as foreign agents.

On 18 and 23 January 2025, Ponasenkov's YouTube channels were blocked due to numerous copyright infringement complaints. The channels were restored later that month.

== Bibliography ==
- Ponasenkov, Evgeniy (2004). The Truth About the War of 1812. Moscow: Reĭttar. ISBN 5-8067-0019-4. OCLC 59760972.
- Ponasenkov, Evgeniy (2020). First Scientific History of the War of 1812 (3-e izdanie, ispravlennoe i dopolnennoe ed.). Moscow. ISBN 978-5-17-120818-9. OCLC 1145194458.
