= Ximena Caminos =

Cultural entrepreneur, and environmental activist

- Born: 20th century Buenos Aires, Argentina
- Occupations: Curator, Cultural Entrepreneur, Environmental Activist
- Known for: Founding REEFLINE, Leadership in Faena Art, Urban Placemaking
- Website: honeylab.art/Ximena

Ximena Caminos is an Argentine art curator, visual artist cultural entrepreneur, and environmental activist recognised for integrating public art with marine conservation and sustainable urban development. Founder of the ocean-centric nonprofit BlueLab Preservation Society, and founder of The ReefLine a 7-mile underwater sculpture park and marine sanctuary in Miami Beach, and played pivotal roles in establishing cultural districts in Buenos Aires and Miami through Faena Art and The Underline. She is a regular collaborator of the Cultural Affairs Management of the City of Miami, for whom she has curated several exhibitions and art installations.

== Early career and education ==
Caminos was born in Buenos Aires and studied art, philosophy, and stage design under prominent Latin American artists, including Luis Felipe Noé and Eduardo Stupía. Her early career included curatorial work at the Museo de Arte Latinoamericano de Buenos Aires (MALBA) and the Centro Cultural Recoleta, where she developed her philosophy of "cultural acupuncture" to revitalise urban spaces.

== Career ==
=== Faena Art and cultural placemaking ===
In 2004, Caminos co-founded Faena Art, a nonprofit platform for interdisciplinary art, with developer Alan Faena. She spearheaded the Faena Prize for the Arts, one of Latin America's largest art awards, and transformed Buenos Aires' Puerto Madero district into a cultural hub. She later expanded Faena Art to Miami Beach, curating large-scale installations by artists such as Leandro Erlich and Refik Anadol.

Ximena Caminos is a public speaker who has presented on art and social impact at events including Aspen Climate Ideas, Harvard University, Northeastern University, Fortune 500 CEOs, and other cultural forums worldwide.

=== The REEFLINE Project ===
In 2019, Caminos launched The Reefline, a $5 million citizen-approved artificial reef system off Miami Beach designed to combat coastal erosion and promote marine biodiversity through submerged sculptures. The project, developed with scientists from Coral Morphologic, includes works by Erlich and OMA.

=== Other key projects ===
- The Underline: As artistic visionary planner, Caminos integrated public art into a 16-km linear park beneath Miami's Metrorail, addressing urban "scars" through community-focused design.
- HoneyLab Creative: Founded in 2018, this agency merges art, sustainability, and urban planning, collaborating with institutions like Claridge's and Faena Hotels.

== Awards and recognition ==
- Knight Foundation Arts Champion Award (2024) for community impact through art.
- Founding member of the Solomon R. Guggenheim Museum’s Latin American Circle and advisor to Art Basel Cities.
- Juror for cultural projects in Saudi Arabia, including Uptown Jeddah and the Riyadh Hub masterplan.
- 2026 Exemplary Woman Award - Miami Beach Commission for Women

== Personal life ==
Caminos lives in Miami. She was married and has three children.
