= Anastasia Vasilyeva =

Russian ophthalmologist (born 1984)

- Анастасия Васильева
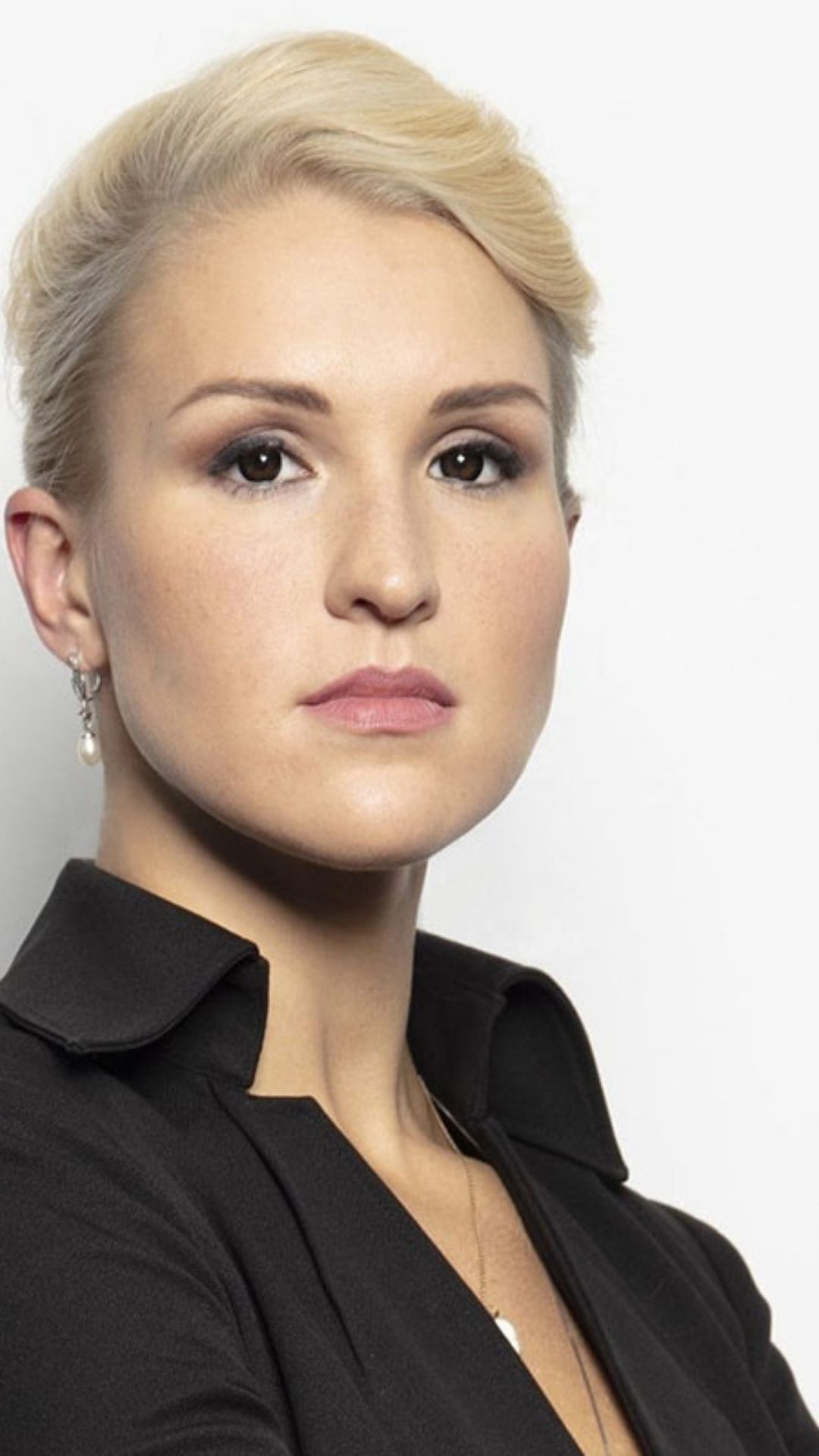
- Vasilyeva in 2021
- Born: 12 March 1984 (age 42); Moscow, Russian SFSR, Soviet Union
- Education: First Moscow State Medical University
- Known for: personal doctor to Alexei Navalny
- Scientific career
- Fields: ophthalmology
- Workplaces: Research Institute of Eye Diseases; First Moscow State Medical University

Anastasia Yevgenyevna Vasilyeva (Russian: Анастасия Евгеньевна Васильева; born 12 March 1984) is a Russian ophthalmologist and human rights activist who was the personal doctor to opposition politician Alexei Navalny. Vasilyeva founded the Alliance of Doctors, an independent medical trade union that was originally aligned to Navalny's Anti-Corruption Foundation, before she publicly distanced herself from Navalny and the ACF in 2021. In addition to her political activism, Vasilyeva gained prominence during the COVID-19 pandemic in Russia due to her public criticisms of Vladimir Putin's response.

== Early life and education ==
Vasilyeva was born in Moscow to an ophthalmologist mother. She studied medicine at the First Moscow State Medical University, graduating in 2006, and completed graduate studies in ophthalmology in 2013. She worked at the Research Institute of Eye Diseases as well as teaching at her alma mater before entering private practice in 2018. Vasilyeva has a son and a daughter and lives in Moscow.

== Activism ==
=== Support of Alexei Navalny ===
Vasilyeva first treated Alexei Navalny in 2017 after green dye was thrown into one of his eyes in 2017 by pro-Russian government supporters. She subsequently reached out to Navalny for support after her mother, alongside other senior ophthalmologists, were fired from the First Moscow State Medical University in 2018. Navalny's Anti-Corruption Foundation provided the doctors with free legal aid, and they were subsequently offered their jobs back. On 20 August 2020, after Navalny was poisoned, Vasilyeva accompanied his wife, Yulia Navalnaya, to the hospital in Omsk where he was being held, though they were originally barred from seeing him. Vasilyeva later appeared on RTVI and publicly stated her belief that Navalny was experiencing organophosphate poisoning, and that doctors in Omsk had prevented her from seeing him for two days to stop her finding evidence of this.

Vasilyeva subsequently founded the Alliance of Doctors (Russian: Альянса врачей, romanized: Alyansa vrachey), an independent medical trade union, which became allied with Navalny's Trade Union and the ACF. She later went on to ally the Alliance of Doctors with other opposition political parties, including the Communist Party of the Russian Federation and Yabloko. The Alliance of Doctors was founded to fight for fair wages and conditions for medical staff.

In January 2021, during a crackdown on supporters of Navalny following his arrest after returning to Russia from Germany, a video clip of Vasilyeva playing "Für Elise" on her piano while her flat was raided by police went viral on social media. Vasilyeva went on to take part in a public protest calling on Navalny's release, and was subsequently placed under house arrest for breaching COVID-19 restrictions, though her arrest was subsequently reversed.

On 18 February 2021, alongside several other doctors, Vasilyeva protested outside the corrective colony where Navalny was being held in Pokrov, requesting to treat Navalny in response to reports that he was suffering from back problems and numbness. The group were not permitted access to the prison. Vasilyeva arranged a mass rally outside the colony on 6 April 2021, during which she was detained. On 14 October, she was issued a one-year restriction from travelling outside Moscow, leaving her home at night, and attending mass gatherings, in response to her pro-Navalny protests.

On 3 March 2021, the Doctors Alliance was declared a "foreign agent" by the Russian government.

In September 2021, Vasilyeva publicly broke ties with Navalny and the ACL, accusing Leonid Volkov, Ivan Zhdanov, and Maria Pevchikh of having abandoned her and the Doctors Association in Russia after all three fled the country. Vasilyeva's comments were controversial, with some claiming she was put under pressure by United Russia to criticise Navalny ahead of legislative elections, comparing her to Belarusian activist Roman Protasevich, who spoke out in favour of the Belarusian government after being detained by security forces.

=== COVID-19 pandemic ===
Vasilyeva gained prominence as a vocal critic of the Russian government's response to the COVID-19 pandemic. Vasilyeva accused the government of understating the severity of the pandemic, and of failing to implement the appropriate infrastructure to the Russian healthcare system to enable it to successfully manage the disease. Vasilyeva was sceptical of publicly published figures showing relatively low numbers of positive cases in the country, stating that such figures did not take into account delays at processing COVID-19 tests at the country's one testing facility in Siberia.

Vasilyeva fundraised for personal protective equipment for medical staff across Russia, and co-ordinated the delivery of PPE to regional hospitals. She criticised the Russian government for sending PPE supplies to countries such as the United States despite high demand in Russian medical facilities.

On 31 March 2020, the Investigative Committee of Russia questioned Vasilyeva on charges of spreading fake news about coronavirus. On 2 April, she was detained at the border with Novgorod Oblast while attempting to deliver PPE. She was charged with breaking quarantine restrictions in Moscow, and the following day received additional charges for refusing to leave her car while it was being towed, and for refusing arrest on that charge. Vasilyeva was made to pay fines for all three offences.
