= Mikhail Labkovsky =

Russian psychologist

- Born: 1961 (age 64–65); Moscow

Mikhail Labkovsky (Russian: Михаи́л Алекса́ндрович Лабко́вский) is a Russian psychologist, writer, TV and Radio host.

Michael is a grandson of Albert Manfred.

Labkovsky was diagnosed with ADHD at 50 years of age. He managed to graduate from the university only after the third attempt at 28, then moved to Israel and worked as a psychologist with troubled teenagers. Upon return to Russia, he opened private practice and started as an invited expert on radio and TV, later he launched his own shows.

In 2020 Russian Forbes named Labkovsky the most successful Russian psychologist with an income of more than 130 mln roubles per year. By 2021, his book 'I want and I will' was sold in more than 1 mln copies.

== Literature ==
- Matza, Tomas (2018). Shock Therapy: Psychology, Precarity, and Well-Being in Postsocialist Russia. Duke University Press. ISBN 9780822371953.
