= Korea Testing & Research Institute =

Testing and certification institute in South Korea

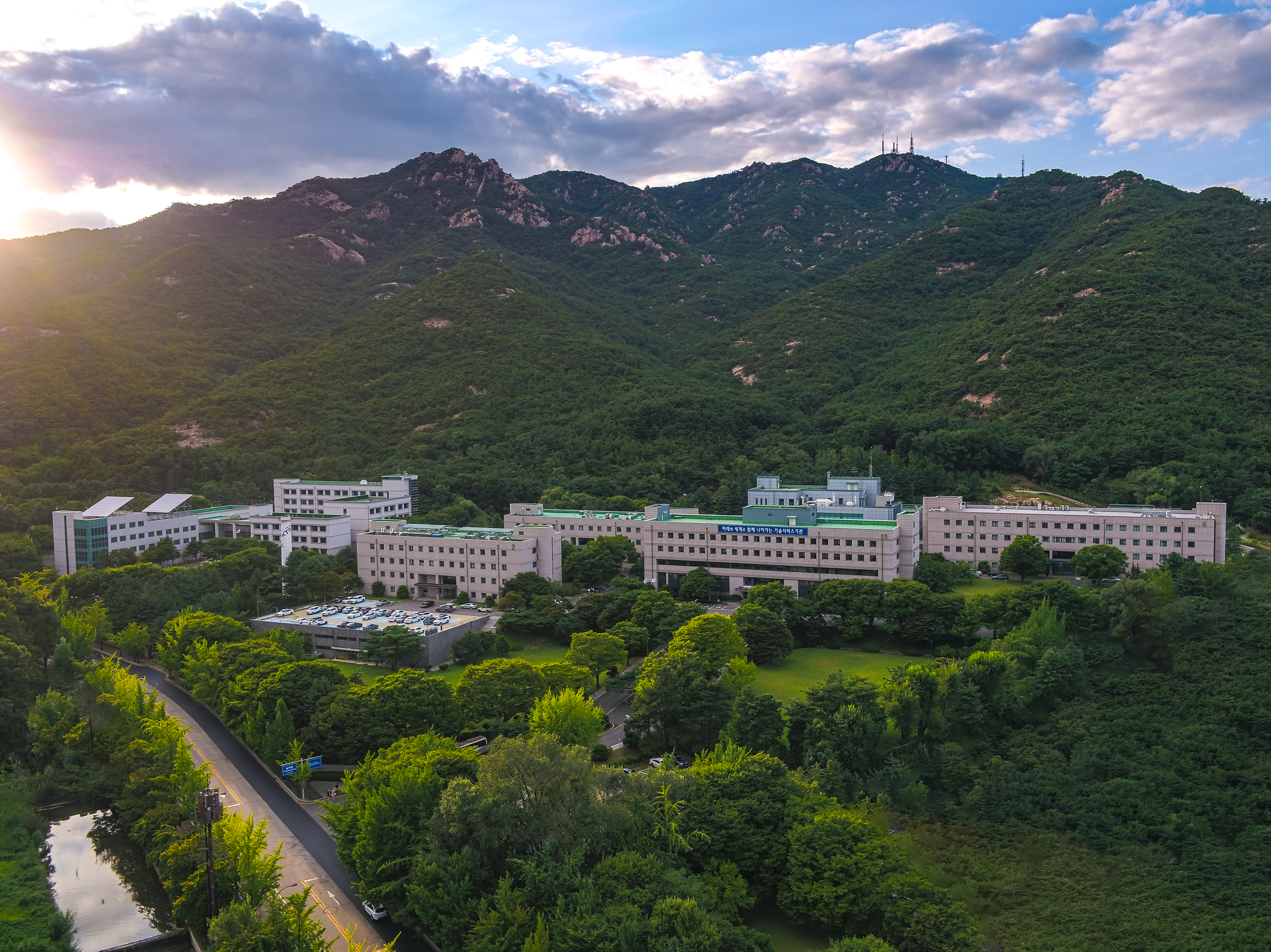
KTR Gwacheon HQ

The Korea Testing & Research Institute (Korean: 한국화학융합시험연구원), abbreviated as KTR, is a testing and certification institute in South Korea which performs integrate testing, certification, and technical consulting for all fields of the industry.

The Institute is known as an international recognized testing body (ISO/IEC 17025), a national recognized inspection institute for certifying ISO/IEC 17020, an international product recognition body (ISO/IEC Guide 65), and a national certification body (NCB) by International Commission on the Rules for the Approval of Electrical Equipment (IECEE).

In addition, KTR performs not only national certifications such as KC and KS, but also the international certification works such as CE, GOST-R, EAC, JIS, IECEE-CB, FCC, NSF, PSE, and Energy Star which are issued by the abroad main exporting countries, for example Europe, Russia, Japan, and the USA, through construction of business partnership with 40 foreign countries and 180 foreign institutes. Based on this, KTR performs Registration, Evaluation and Authorization of Chemicals (REACH) of Europe, China, Japan, etc. Moreover, KTR does supportive business for enterprises such as KOLAS/KAS officially recognized training, enterprise product development, failure cause analysis, associate business of industry, academy, and research, etc.

As Korea's largest testing & certification complex established in Gwacheon, KTR implements differentiated testing & certification procedures for the various industrial sectors with its specialized know-how. The seven industrial research institutions of KTR also provide comprehensive and systematic testing & certification services.

== Purpose of Foundation ==
KTR is established to effectively perform testing, research, and certification as well as technical development for the chemical & environment, bio & nanotechnology, component & material, information & communications, and high-technology convergence. To provide good quality of testing and certification service to companies through the conformity assessment such as testing analysis, inspection, certification, assessment, evaluation, type examination, and calibration, the technology & research development, standardization business, actions to technical barriers, diagnosis & inspection & assessment for factor of technology & administration, assessment works, conformity assessment support for green products and green technology, support for technical innovation of national industry, provide of technical information, supportive business for educational training and advertisement, international cooperation program including MOU, and to enhance Korean testing and certification bodies' international competitiveness, KTR (In Korean, 한국화학시험연구원) is combined with EMC Research Institute (ERI) (In Korean, 한국전자파연구원) on July, 2010, and then enlarged KTR (In Korean, 한국화학융합시험연구원) is launched. (National Standard Regulation Article 30, Clause 2)

1. National Standard Regulation Article of Korea

== Location and branch ==
KTR comprises offices in 26 Korean major cities as geographical areas and abroad branches:

=== Headquarters ===
- Gwacheon

=== Laboratories ===
- Yongin Laboratories (Electrical & Electronic, Electrical Energy, Lighting, Batteries)
- Incheon Laboratories (Materials, Components, Construction)
- Ulsan (I· II) Laboratories (Shipbuilding & Offshore Plants, Steel, Nuclear power Generation)
- Hwasun Laboratories (Bio/Medical Devices, Healthcare, Animal Testing, Clinical Skin)
- Gwangyang Laboratories (Functional materials R&D Support)
- Suncheon Laboratories (Support for the commercialization of advanced rubber materials)

=== Foreign branches ===
- China (Shanghai, Qingdao, Shenzhen)
- Germany (Frankfurt)
- Vietnam (Hanoi)
- Mexico (Mexico City)

== Organization ==
KTR is mainly organized into 8 divisions, 7 institutes, 84 teams and 6 foreign offices:

- Personnel Management Division
- Audit Division
- Research Committee Division
- Management Planning Division
- Business Support Division
- Global Business Division
- Certification Division
- Materials & Components Research Institute
- Chemicals&Environment Research Institute
- Construction Safety Research Institute
- Electric & Energy Research Institute
- Medical Device-Bio Research Institute
- Healthcare Advanced Chemical Research Institute
- Key Industry Research Institute
- Export Certification Division
