= All-Russian Confederation of Labour =

VKT
- All-Russian Confederation of Labour
- Всероссийская конфедерация труда
- Merged into: Confederation of Labour of Russia
- Founded: August 12, 1995
- Dissolved: April 23, 2010
- Headquarters: Moscow, Russia
- Location: Russia
- Members: 1.27 million
- Affiliations: ITUC, GCTU
- Website: www.vkt.org.ru

The All-Russian Confederation of Labour (Russian: Всероссийская конфедерация труда) (VKT) was a national trade union center in Russia. It was formed August 17, 1995, and had a membership of 1.27 million.

The VKT, along with the Confederation of Labour of Russia, publishes the Ob’edinennaya profsoyuznaya gazeta.

The VKT is affiliated with the International Trade Union Confederation, and the General Confederation of Trade Unions.

In April 2010, the VKT and the Confederation of Labour of Russia (KTR) merged. The President of the VKT, Boris Kravchenko, was appointed to the post of General Secretary of the KTR. Then, on May 15 of the same year, the seventh extraordinary congress of the VKT was held, at which it was decided to terminate the activities of the trade union association and join the Confederation of Labour of Russia.
