= Alexander Kabanov (chemist) =

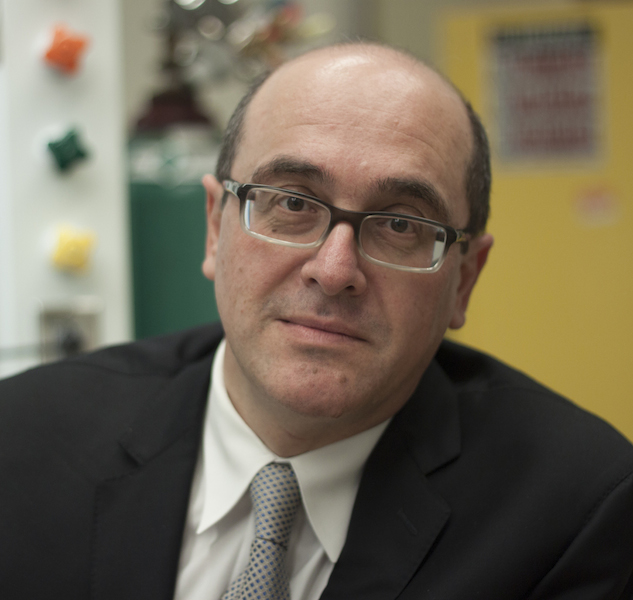
- Born: 27 March 1962 (age 64); Moscow, USSR
- Education: Moscow State University
- Known for: Drug delivery, Nanomedicine
- Awards: Lenin Komsomol Prize; NSF Career award RASA George Gamow award Controlled Release Society Founders award
- Scientific career
- Fields: Chemical, Biomedical
- Workplaces: UNC Eshelman School of Pharmacy
- Doctoral advisor: Karel Martinek; Andrey Levashov

Alexander Viktorovich Kabanov (Russian: Александр Викторович Кабанов; born 27 March 1962 in Moscow, Soviet Union (now Russia)), is a Russian and American chemist, an educator, an entrepreneur, and a researcher in the fields of drug delivery and nanomedicine.

== Biography and career ==
Kabanov was born in Moscow, USSR on 27 March 1962, in the family of Soviet chemist Viktor A. Kabanov. He graduated from the Faculty of Chemistry of the Moscow State University in 1984, where he also received PhD – Candidate of Chemical Sciences in 1987 and D.Sc. – Doctor of Chemical Sciences in 1990. In 1994 he reallocated to United States to the University of Nebraska Medical Center where he served on a faculty for nearly 18 years before moving to University of North Carolina at Chapel Hill in 2012. He is currently Mescal Swaim Ferguson Distinguished Professor at the UNC Eshelman School of Pharmacy, director of the Center for Nanotechnology in Drug Delivery and the Carolina Institute for Nanomedicine at the University of North Carolina at Chapel Hill.

Kabanov is a highly cited researcher and as of January 2023 has over 47,000 citations with an h-index of 110. He published over 350 scientific papers and holds at least 36 US patents. He co-founded several pharmaceutical companies including Supratek Pharma Inc., SoftKemo, Bendarex and DelAQUA Pharmaceuticals. He trained over 70 graduate students and postdocs, half of whom are women and underrepresented minorities and 16 became faculty.

Kabanov was a founding director of the NIH Center of Biomedical Research Excellence (CoBRE) "Nebraska Center for Nanomedicine" and is the director of the NIH T32 Carolina Cancer Nanotechnology Training Program. He founded the Nanomedicine and Drug Delivery symposium series that has been held annually since 2003. He is the editor-in-chief of the scientific journals Reviews and Advances in Chemistry (ReACh) and Doklady Chemistry. He served a director-at-large of the Controlled Release Society (2019–2022), and is the past President (2018–2020) and the chief executive officer of the Russian American Science Association (RASA).

== Contributions to science ==
Kabanov made broad impact to pharmaceutical sciences and advanced polymer and colloidal sciences by developing novel methods using nanotechnology for the therapeutic delivery of small drugs, nucleic acids, and proteins. His early work was in the field of enzyme catalysis in surfactant aggregates in organic media, where he developed methods using reverse micelles as nanoscale reactors for modification of proteins, controllable assembly of oligomeric enzymes and tailoring protein-polymer conjugates for bioengineering applications. He developed fatty acylated proteins and hydrophobically modified oligonucleotides to impart them ability to interact with lipid membranes and improve transport into a cell and across the blood brain barrier. He and K. Kataoka independently discovered electrostatic driven self-assembly of complexes of polyelectrolyte block copolymers with oppositely charged polyelectrolytes and surfactants ("block ionomer complexes"), and studied basic patterns of nanoparticle formation, morphology, stability, polyelectrolyte interchange and environmental responses in such systems.

He was among the first to use nanosized complexes of polycations and later, cationic block copolymers for the delivery of nucleic acids into a cell (known today as "polyplexes") and developed core-shell polyelectrolyte complexes for the therapeutic drug delivery of polypeptides such as antioxidant enzymes and scavengers of organophosphate poisons.

In late the late 1980s Kabanov published seminal work on the use of polymeric micelles as a nanoparticle delivery platform for small drug molecules. His work led to the first polymeric micelle drug to enter clinical trials and was instrumental in establishment of polymeric micelles as a clinically approved drug delivery platform.

Kabanov laboratory published large body of work on pharmacological effects of poloxamer block copolymers, known by the trade name Pluronic. He discovered diverse phenomena induced by these polymers in biology such as inhibition of drug efflux transport systems, hypersensitization of multidrug resistant cancer cells, increased drug permeability across brain microvessel endothelial and intestinal epithelial barriers, foreign nucleic acid transfer from macrophages to muscle cells and gene expression in the muscle tissue.

His papers and inventions introduced nanogels, cross-linked polymeric micelles, and high-capacity poly(2-oxazoline) micelles for the delivery of diverse biological agents. Kabanov and co-workers also reported some of the early work on macrophages and macrophage-derived exosomes for the delivery of therapeutic polypeptides and nucleic acids to the sites of inflammation in the brain to treat neurological diseases.

== Awards and honors ==
His honors include the Lenin Komsomol Prize (1988), the NSF Career award (1995), the RASA George Gamow award (2017), and the Controlled Release Society Founders award (2022). He was elected a member of Academia Europaea (2013), American Academy of Sciences and Letters (2025), a corresponding member of the Russian Academy of Sciences (2019), and a fellow of the American Institute for Medical and Biological Engineering (2015), the National Academy of Inventors (2017), the Controlled Release Society (2018), and the American Association for the Advancement of Science (2021).

== Public position ==
Kabanov has taken public position against the use of chemical weapons and in 2021 co-authored a petition signed by nearly a thousand Russian-speaking scientists demanding Russian authorities to end political prosecution of Alexei Navalny and his supporters, investigate his poisoning and turn to international cooperation to confront global threats, On 24 February 2022, Kabanov signed an open letter of Russian scientists and journalists against the war in Ukraine, and then organized public statements from the Russian-speaking researchers living overseas condemning the Russian aggression in Ukraine and in support of the scholars affected by the war. In 2026, following the designation of RASA as "undesirable organization" Kabanov was designated "foreign agent", along with several other RASA members.
