= Alan Faena =

Argentine hotelier and real estate developer

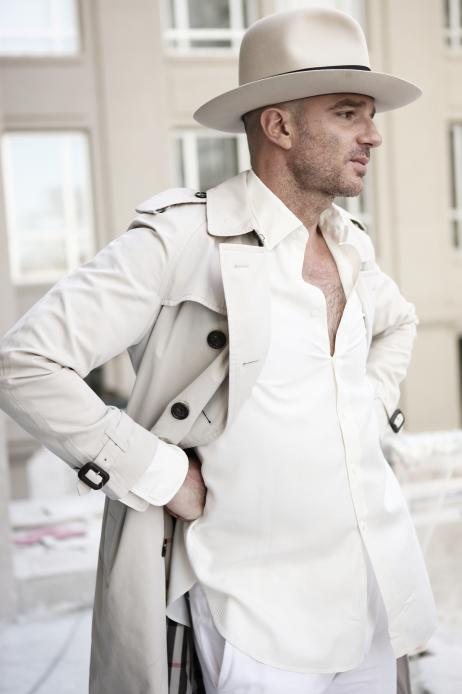
- Born: Alan Roger Faena; 28 November 1963 (age 62); Buenos Aires, Argentina
- Occupations: Real estate development, hotels, fine art
- Spouse: Grace Goldsmith (2023)
- Children: 1

Alan Roger Faena (born 28 November 1963, in Buenos Aires) is an Argentine hotelier and real estate developer who has developed properties in his native Buenos Aires, as well as Miami Beach, Florida.

Faena is the founder and President of Faena Group. He is a member of the Tate International Committee and the New Museum Leaders Council. He previously founded Via Vai in 1985, an Argentine fashion label, and worked as a fashion designer.

== Early life ==
Born in Buenos Aires, Argentina in 1963 to a Syrian immigrant family, his father was a textile manufacturer.

== Career ==
=== Early career ===
In 1985, Faena followed in his parents footsteps into the textile industry and founded the fashion label Via Vai at age 19. He launched the brand with 50 colored shirts he funded himself. The brand expanded to include ready-to-wear collections and a denim line. Faena sold the company in 1996.

=== Faena Buenos Aires ===
Faena was a fashion designer for over ten years before beginning a career in real estate development in 2000. He partnered with Len Blavatnik, Philippe Starck and Foster + Partners to redevelop abandoned docklands in the Puerto Madero neighborhood of Buenos Aires, Argentina. Foster + Partner's residential condominium in re-development was their first project in South America. The Faena Hotel designed by Starck opened in 2004.

The Faena District, which is estimated to be a $200 million development, is the most valuable real estate in Buenos Aires. The Faena Arts Center, a converted flour mill located in the center of the district, opened in September 2011 and displays the work of local and international artists.

In November 2011, German artist Franz Ackermann exhibited the results of his voyages around Buenos Aires with the largest mural of his career in the center. The Cuban duo Los Carpinteros debuted their first solo exhibition in Buenos Aires at the arts center in May 2012.

=== Faena Miami Beach ===
Faena expanded his brand to Miami Beach with a $1 billion project to develop a six block waterfront property. Construction on the Miami Beach Faena District began in 2013.

The project includes the restoration of the 1948 Saxony hotel, and an arts center, Faena Forum, by architect Rem Koolhaas and OMA and residences by Foster + Partners.

Baz Luhrmann and Catherine Martin are also involved in the project as designers for the interior of the Faena Hotel Miami Beach.

The district will be landscaped by Miami-based firm Raymond Jungles. The Faena House, an 18-story residential unit, is the project's first building scheduled for completion.

== Personal life ==
Faena was married to Ximena Caminos, the couple had a son together. They separated in 2017 and divorced two years later. Faena crashed Grace Goldsmith’s mother’s birthday party at Saxony Bar in May 2021, where he met Grace. They married on March 4, 2023.

== Paradise Papers ==
On 5 November 2017, the Paradise Papers, a set of confidential electronic documents relating to offshore investment, revealed that Faena was director and CEO of half a dozen offshore companies in Cayman Islands and British Virgin Islands. Faena also appears with bank accounts in Luxembourg and the Isle of Man, linked to different hotels and real estate projects in Puerto Madero.
