= Russian foreign agent law =

2012 Russian law

Foreign agent law
- Long title: On Amendments to Legislative Acts of the Russian Federation regarding the Regulation of the Activities of Non-profit Organizations Performing the Functions of a Foreign Agent
- Citation: Law 121-FZ of 20 July 2012
- Enacted: 20 July 2012
- Commenced: 21 November 2012

Legislative history
- Bill title: 102766-6

The Russian foreign agent law requires any person or organization receiving any form of support from outside Russia or deemed to be under foreign influence to register as a foreign agent (Russian: иностранный агент, romanized: inostrannyy agent). Unlike the United States Foreign Agents Registration Act (FARA) which targets those specifically acting on behalf of and under control of foreign principals, the Russian law presumes foreign control from any foreign support, however minimal. While FARA applies mainly to professional lobbyists and political consultants working for foreign governments, the Russian legislation affects a broad range of civil society actors including NGOs, media organizations, journalists, and private individuals.

First enacted in 2012 as a response to protests against Vladimir Putin's return to the presidency, the law has been progressively expanded through numerous amendments. The designation carries heavy administrative burdens including mandatory audits, detailed reporting requirements, and obligatory labeling of all publications with a disclaimer about foreign agent status. Organizations and individuals designated as foreign agents face significant restrictions on their activities and risk substantial fines or criminal prosecution for non-compliance.

The European Court of Human Rights has ruled that the law violates fundamental rights and bears "hallmarks of a totalitarian regime" by creating an environment of suspicion toward independent voices. The term foreign agent (Russian: иностранный агент, romanized: inostrannyy agent) itself carries strong negative connotations in Russian, associated with Cold War-era espionage, and has been criticized as a tool for stigmatizing and suppressing civil society and press freedom within Russia, particularly groups opposed to Vladimir Putin.

== History of legislation ==
=== Russian non-profit organizations ===
On 21 November 2012, the Federal Law of 20 July 2012 No. 121-FZ "On Amendments to Legislative Acts of the Russian Federation regarding the Regulation of the Activities of Non-profit Organizations Performing the Functions of a Foreign Agent", which amends Federal Law No. 82-FZ "On public associations" of 19 May 1995, Federal Law No. 7-FZ "On Non-profit Organizations" of 12 January 1996, Federal Law No. 115-FZ "On countering the legalization (laundering) of the proceeds of crime and the financing of terrorism" of 7 August 2001, the Criminal Code of Russia, and the Criminal Procedure Code of Russia, entered into force. In accordance to this law, any Russian non-profit organization, except for state and municipal companies, can be declared a foreign agent if it participates in political activity in Russia and receives funding from foreign sources. Political activity is defined as influencing public opinion and public policy, including sending requests and petitions.

=== Foreign-agent media organizations and individuals ===
==== Amendments to Mass Media Act (2017) ====
Federal Law No. 327-FZ, enacted on 25 November 2017, introduced the concept of a "foreign media organization performing the functions of a foreign agent" into the Mass Media Act (no. 2124–1, 27 December 1991). A foreign-agent media organization is defined as any foreign entity, incorporated or otherwise, that disseminates printed, audio, audiovisual, or other content intended for an unrestricted audience and receives funding or assets from foreign sources, directly or through Russian entities. These organizations are subject to the same obligations as foreign-agent non-governmental organizations (NGOs).

==== Expansion of the definition (2019) ====
Federal Law No. 426-FZ, passed on 2 December 2019, further expanded the scope of foreign-agent media organizations to include individuals. It also introduced a new ground for the designation, allowing individuals or Russian legal entities involved in the creation or dissemination of publications from foreign media organizations or Russian legal entities established by foreign-agent media organizations to be designated as foreign agents. Furthermore, it mandated that each designated foreign entity and individual must establish a Russian legal entity within one month of its designation, which will be registered as a foreign agent and must adhere to the same obligations as a foreign-agent NGO. All materials distributed by these entities must be clearly labelled as originating from a foreign agent, with distribution without the required labelling prohibited.

==== Labelling requirements (2020) ====
On 23 September 2020, Roskomnadzor, the Russian telecom and media regulator, issued Order No. 124, which outlines specific labelling requirements for materials produced or disseminated by foreign-agent media organizations. The order specifies that labelling has to include a notice indicating the content's foreign-agent status, with the text size being twice that of the main text for printed and online materials. For audiovisual content, the label has to cover at least 20% of the image and be prominently displayed at the start of the material, lasting for at least 15 seconds before any interruptions.

=== Foreign-agent unregistered associations and individuals ===
==== Extension to unregistered associations and individuals (2020) ====
Federal Law No. 481-FZ, enacted on 30 December 2020, expanded the foreign-agent designation to unregistered public associations involved in political activities and receiving funds from foreign sources. The law also applied to individuals, regardless of nationality, who engage in political activity or collect information about Russia's military capabilities and receive foreign funding. Designated individuals must submit reports on their activities and personal expenditures every six months and label all communications with a foreign agent notice.

==== Further restrictions on media (2020) ====
The law also amended the Mass Media Act, prohibiting media and internet publications from mentioning any foreign-agent entities or individuals or sharing their materials without including a notice of their foreign-agent status.

== Foreign Agents Act of 2022 ==
=== New foreign agent definition (2022) ===
Federal Law No. 255-FZ, passed on 14 July 2022, replaced all previous foreign agent legislation. The law defines a foreign agent as any Russian or foreign entity or individual who receives support or is under foreign influence, and who engages in political activities, gathers information on military capabilities, or creates and disseminates information intended for a broad audience. Political activities include public events, lobbying, conducting opinion polls, and expressing views on government policies.

=== Definitions of foreign influence and sources ===
Foreign influence is defined as receiving support, whether monetary, organizational, or advisory, from foreign sources, which include foreign states, organizations, nationals, and any individual or entity under foreign influence.

=== Public register and disclosure requirements ===
The Ministry of Justice maintains a public register of designated foreign agents, which includes personal details such as full names, pseudonyms, taxpayer identification numbers, and grounds for designation. Foreign agents must disclose their status in political activities and label all materials as originating from a foreign agent.

== Restrictions on foreign agents ==
=== Prohibitions on public roles ===
Designated foreign agents are prohibited from holding public office, participating in election commissions, serving on public advisory boards, and nominating candidates for prison monitoring boards. They are also barred from making political donations, organizing public events, and supporting election campaigns.

=== Restrictions in education and media ===
Designated individuals and entities are banned from engaging in any kind of educational activity, holding positions in state or municipal educational institutions, and producing content for minors. They are also ineligible for either state or municipal financial support, as well as arts grants. They are also prohibited from participating in public procurement.

=== Other restrictions ===
Foreign agents are barred from investing in or operating critical information infrastructure, providing environmental or anti-corruption expert opinions, and advertising in foreign-agent media organizations. Violations of these regulations can result in administrative or criminal liability, and repeated breaches may lead to the liquidation of the legal entity involved.

== Implications for NGOs ==
The foreign agent label increases registration barriers for an NGO in Russia. This includes restrictions on foreigners and stateless peoples from establishing or even participating in the organization. A NGO must then submit to extensive audits. Supervisory powers are allowed to intervene and interrupt the internal affairs of the NGO with suspensions for up to six months.

Once labeled as foreign agents, organizations are obliged to mark all their publications and to begin each oral statement with a disclosure that it is being given by a foreign agent. The label also limits the way a foreign organization can make tax-exempt donations to specific people or the NGO by requiring them to register and be placed on a very limited list of approved organizations.

Some NGOs report curtailed access to government officials and public institutions and continued harassment. NGO raids have been reported as being accompanied by television crews from NTV.

A Ministry of Justice report obtained by the Russian business daily Vedomosti in May 2016 said criticism of the foreign agent law qualifies as political activity under the foreign agent law.

== Enforcement ==
=== 2010s ===
On 4 June 2014, an amendment to the foreign agent law came into force, authorizing the Ministry of Justice to register independent groups as foreign agents without their consent, if the ministry regards the organizations as engaged in political activity and if the organization is receiving foreign funding.

By 29 June 2015, according to a report by the Council of Europe's Commissioner for Human Rights, the list of foreign agents included at least 70 NGOs. Of those, only five organizations voluntarily agreed to designate themselves as foreign agents. At least 20 NGOs have ceased their activity either in full or in part, including through self-liquidation. The majority of organizations were included in the first half of 2015. By 24 October 2016, according to a report by Human Rights Watch, the list of active foreign agents included 105 NGOs. Of those, four registered voluntarily and at least 58 were prosecuted for not doing so.

Law enforcement officers in Russia have raided the offices of several targeted organizations to seize documents and records related to their operation. Several prominent international organizations have been targeted, including Amnesty International, Human Rights Watch, and Transparency International. Overall, more than 55 organizations in 16 Russian regions have been audited. These raids are often joined by journalists from NTV, which has aired programs accusing human rights and opposition activists of pushing the interests of the US.

In June 2017, head of the human rights NGO Women of the Don Valentina Cherevatenko was formally charged with malicious evasion of legal requirements set out in the law, making it the first criminal proceedings initiated for non-compliance. She faced two years in prison. In late July 2017, the charges against Cherevatenko were dropped.

Usually the legal basis for foreign agent designation is not available. Petr Manyakhin, who was designated a foreign agent himself and countered this in court, received a legal justification from the Ministry of Justice who argued that Manyakhin received funding in foreign currencies based on three USD bank transfers, which were between his own accounts. Further reasons given were a single retweet in support of Meduza and Manyakhin's 2020 article about torture by the Novosibirsk police.

=== 2020s ===
In September 2021, the law was amended to include a 60-item list of topics, the discussion of which could result in the offender being added to the foreign agents register.

By December 2021, more than 100 Russian media outlets had been declared foreign agents, and many were forced to close.

No trial is required; a request from the Ministry of Justice is sufficient to declare a person or organization a foreign agent, and the Ministry does not need to explain its reasoning. There are many cases in which this contradicts common sense; for instance, the GOLOS Association was declared a foreign agent for receiving the Sakharov Prize.

The extended Foreign Agent Law allowed the authorities to shut down Russia's oldest human rights NGO, Memorial.

A 2021 report by OVD-Info details the existing legislation and its application. While the government claims that the designation does not prevent freedom of speech and merely ensures transparency about who is speaking, the report indicates that the regulation has had a strong chilling effect on the media, which avoid quoting designated organizations and individuals. The designees themselves withdraw from public debate as a result of high financial fines imposed by Roskomnadzor—for example, for failing to include a lengthy legal disclaimer even when sharing someone else's post on social media. Furthermore, entities designated as foreign agents are prohibited from acting as election observers, legislative experts, candidates for public supervisory commissions, and other public functions. At the same time, the criteria for designation are extremely broad and vague, ranging from actually receiving foreign grants to "participation in an international conference with accommodation at the expense of the organizer", "a gift from friends or relatives living abroad", or even the transfer of funds from one's own account in foreign currency.

By the spring of 2022, dozens more prominent Russian journalists, public activists, and scientists had been declared foreign agents. Notable individuals include politicians Leonid Volkov, Garry Kasparov, Mikhail Khodorkovsky, political scientist Ekaterina Schulmann, journalists Roman Dobrokhotov, Karen Shainyan, Yelizaveta Osetinskaya, Alexander Nevzorov, Alexei Venediktov, Vladimir Kara-Murza, historian Yevgeni Ponasenkov, satirist Viktor Shenderovich, and YouTuber Yury Dud.

The first recorded case of individuals being removed from the register occurred in April 2022, when the Ministry of Justice delisted election monitoring experts Arkady Lyubarev and Lyudmila Kuzmina.

In July 2022, Federal Law No. 255-FZ "On Control over Activities of Persons Under Foreign Influence" was adopted. Under the revised rules, authorities no longer need evidence of foreign funding to designate someone a foreign agent—a claim of foreign influence is now sufficient. The law defines such influence as support or pressure from a foreign source, including through coercion, persuasion, or other means. In addition to the register of foreign agents, a new register of "affiliated persons" was created. It includes founders, leaders, or employees of organizations designated as foreign agents, as well as individuals who received funding from, or were involved in the activities of, listed foreign agents.

Since 15 October 2025, criminal cases against "foreign agents" can be initiated after a single fine for violating the law.

On 1 January 2026, amendments to the Russian tax code came into effect. Among other things, they introduced a flat 30% income tax rate for all "foreign agents" (income tax brackets for other Russians range from 13% to 22%).

In 2021, the Russian government began designating many leading American universities as "undesirable organizations." In 2026, this trend accelerated, and now Bard College, Yale, Brigham Young University, George Washington University, UC Berkeley, Tufts, and Stanford are blacklisted, along with several European and American academic organizations (e.g., DAAD and RASA). Following designation of RASA, several of its members and officers were designated as "foreign agents." Currently, the list includes such prominent American scientists as Alexander Kabanov, Igor Efimov, and Sergei Erofeev.

== Notable cases ==
Notable organizations and individuals designated as foreign agents
Name	Case description	Status	Logo or image
Alliance of Doctors	Added in March 2021, the Moscow Alliance Of Doctors (Альянс врачей) is headed by ophthalmologist Anastasia Vasilyeva, who has treated opposition leader Alexei Navalny in the past. It was founded in 2018. It fights for fair wages and working conditions for medical professionals.	Open	
Anti-Corruption Foundation	On 9 October 2019, the Ministry of Justice designated the Anti-Corruption Foundation as a "foreign agent" due to payments coming from the US and Spain. One of these payments was US$50 given by Yuriy Maslikhov, a Russian citizen residing in the US. In an interview with journalists, Maslikhov stated that he had transferred the money from his PayPal account as an individual and he had carried out such donations earlier. Two other payments totalling ₽ 138,505 and 41 kop. (~$2,170) were carried out by Spanish citizen Roberto Fabio Monda Cardenas through CaixaBank on 6 and 17 September 2019. Answering a question of journalists how he, unable to speak Russian, found out the foundation's wire payment instructions after their removal from the organization's official website, Monda Cardenas did not say a word. These payments were carried out at a time when the foundation's bank account was frozen at the request of the Investigative Committee of Russia. Despite the fact that the foundation gave the money back, the Ministry of Justice refused to remove it from the registry of foreign agents.	Liquidated by the decision of 9 June 2021 of the Moscow City Court designating the foundation as an "extremist organization" (case No. 3а-1573/2021). Its successor, the Anti-Corruption Foundation Inc. (based in the US) was designated first as a "foreign agent", then as an "undesirable organization" and eventually as a "terrorist organization".	
Committee Against Torture	Russia's Committee Against Torture disputed their inclusion into the registry in court, but the appeal was rejected. Refusing to operate under the law's conditions, it announced its dissolution.	Closed	
TV Rain	Russian independent television channel TV Rain (Russian: Dozhd) was included in the list of foreign agents on 20 August 2021. As stated by a representative of the Ministry of Justice at a meeting with members of the Presidential Council for Civil Society and Human Rights, TV Rain was designated as a "foreign agent" by the request of Roskomnadzor due to distributing materials prepared by media and individuals which had previously been declared "foreign agents", such as Meduza, Current Time TV, Lev Ponomaryov, and Lyudmila Savitskaya.	On 3 March 2022, the channel was suspended indefinitely by its CEO Natalya Sindeyeva due to legislative changes which would make it impossible to objectively cover events during the Russian invasion of Ukraine. TV Rain later relaunched from studios in Riga, Latvia on 18 July 2022. Later, after the revocation of its Latvian broadcasting license, the studio relocated to Amsterdam, where a Dutch broadcasting license was obtained. In 2023, both the Latvian and the Dutch legal entities of TV Rain were designated as "undesirable organizations".	
Dynasty Foundation	Russia's only private funder of scientific research, shut down after being included in the registry.	Closed	
Glasnost Defense Foundation	After the Glasnost Defence Foundation was designated a "foreign agent", the Organization for Security and Co-operation in Europe and the Russian President's Human Rights Council criticized the decision.	Open	
GlobalGiving		Open	
GOLOS Association	Russia's only independent election monitoring organization, was instructed by the Ministry of Justice to declare themselves a "foreign agent" before accepting an award from the Norwegian Helsinki Committee. After GOLOS refused to register, stating that it had not accepted the prize money, it was fined and suspended for six months. Russian police subsequently raided the offices and the homes of employees and confiscated equipment.	Closed. The group dissolved shortly after its co-chair, Grigory Melkonyants, had been sentenced to 5 years in prison. The prosecution claimed that Golos was a part of ENEMO, an election monitoring NGO designated as an "undesirable organization" in Russia.	
Humanitarian Action	The Ministry of Justice added Humanitarian Action, a charity based in Saint Petersburg, to its list of "foreign agents" in late 2020. The organization works mainly with drug users and people living with HIV.	Open	
Levada Center	Russia's only independent polling agency, received between 1.5% and 3% of its total budget from abroad. It was issued a public warning that it would be eligible under the law. Levada said it suspended foreign funding in 2013. In 2016, the polling agency was named a foreign agent, barring it from work on the upcoming election. Levada's director stated that the designation may mean that Levada would be unable to continue its work as a pollster.	Open	
Lev Ponomaryov	The Russian human rights activist was labeled as a "person performing the functions of a media foreign agent" on 28 December 2020. On 19 March 2026 he was placed on Russian wanted list on suspicion of violating "foreign agent" legislation		
MacArthur Foundation	The American MacArthur Foundation, citing the "foreign agent" law along with its designation as an "undesirable organization", closed its Russian division, which had been operating since 1992.	Closed	
Meduza	Meduza is a Latvian media company which does not have branches or representative offices in Russia. Meduza publishes materials on its website in Russian and English. On April 23, 2021, the Ministry of Justice designated it as "foreign media performing the functions of a foreign agent". In response, the European Union rejected the decision, saying this restriction "goes against Russia's international obligations and human rights commitments". On 26 January 2023 the Russian Prosecutor-General Office designated Meduza an "undesirable organization".	Open	
Memorial International	One of Russia's oldest organizations dedicated to preventing a return to authoritarianism, also refused to register under the law. They were officially audited, and provided 8,776 pages of information documenting their activities. It was placed on the registry on 4 October 2016.	On 28 December 2021, the Supreme Court of Russia ordered the closure of Memorial. On 28 February 2022, the appellate court left the court decision without alteration. The society was removed from the Unified State Register of Legal Entities on 5 April 2022. In February 2026, the Russian authorities declared the German and Swiss legal entities of Memorial "undesirable organizations". On 9 April, the Supreme Court of Russia designated Memorial as an "extremist organization".	
Memorial Human Rights Centre	The Memorial Human Rights Center was officially placed on the government's register of "foreign agents" on 21 July 2014.	On 29 December 2021, the Moscow City Court ordered the liquidation of the Human Rights Centre. On 5 April 2022, the First Appellate Court left the court decision without alteration. The centre was removed from the Unified State Register of Legal Entities on 18 May 2022.	
Dmitry Muratov	On 1 September 2023, Nobel Prize-winning Russian journalist Dmitry Muratov was declared a "foreign agent" by Russian authorities for "creating and disseminating work produced by foreign agents" as well as "using foreign media to promote opinions that are aimed at forming a negative attitude towards Russia's interior and foreign policy".		
Mikhail Kasyanov	Former Russian Prime Minister, and one of the opposition leaders, Mikhail Kasyanov, was declared a "foreign agent" by Russian authorities on 24 November 2023. On 14 October 2025, he, alongside other members of the Anti-War Committee, was charged with two "terrorism" charges ("organizing a terrorist group" and "participating" in it), as well as "violent seizure of power or violent retention of power". He faces life imprisonment and has since been added to Russia's "terrorist and extremists" lists.		
Mikhail Khodorkovsky	The exiled Russian businessperson and politician was designated as a "foreign agent" on 20 May 2022 due to his support of Ukraine and Russian political emigrants during the Russian invasion of Ukraine. On 14 October 2025, he, alongside other members of the Anti-War Committee, was charged with two "terrorism" charges ("organizing a terrorist group" and "participating" in it), as well as "violent seizure of power or violent retention of power". (Mikhail Khodorkovsky specifically was also charged with "public calls to commit terrorist activities"). He faces life imprisonment and has since been added to Russia's "terrorist and extremists" lists.		
Nasiliu.net Center for Working with the Problem of Violence	Added to the "foreign agent" list in December 2020, Nasiliu.net is one of Russia's leading organizations addressing domestic violence. The Ministry of Justice is asking a court to fine Nasiliu.net from ₽300,000 to ₽500,000 ($4,000 to $6,800). The ministry is seeking a fine of up to ₽300,000 against the NGO's director, Anna Rivina. It was founded in 2015 and was registered as an NGO in 2018. It tried appealing the designation in court, but failed to get off the registry. The NGO announced its dissolvement in 2025 due to increasingly repressive nature of the foreign agents statute.	Closed	
Phoenix PLUS	Oryol Region in Russia.	Open	
Radio Free Europe/Radio Liberty	In 2017, the Russian government placed Radio Free Europe Russian Service, six other Radio Free Europe Russian-language news services, and Current Time TV on the list. The fines against Radio Free Europe amount to about ₽70 million ($950,000). In 2024 it was designated as an "undesirable organization".	Open	
Transparency International Russia (TI-R)	The Russian chapter of Transparency International was declared eligible for the label in 2013. The reason given was TI-R receiving money from foreign sources, and being a part of the Expert Commission for Open Governance in Russia, which deals with political activities. TI-R believes that its position on the commission should preclude them from being forced to register as a foreign agent, seeing as it is a status appointed by the Russian Government. It also claims that the phrase political activity is too broadly defined in the law, and that it needs to have a narrow, specific definition. Despite its objections, in April 2015, the Ministry of Justice placed TI-R on its list of "foreign agents".	Closed. On 16 March 2023, the council of TI-R decided to liquidate the legal entity after its designation as an "undesirable organization" by the Russian Prosecutor-General's Office on 6 March 2023.	
Russian-American Science Association (RASA)	In April 2026, RASA was designated as "undesirable organization". Since then several of its members and officers were labelled as foreign agents.	Open.	

== Reactions ==
=== Russia ===
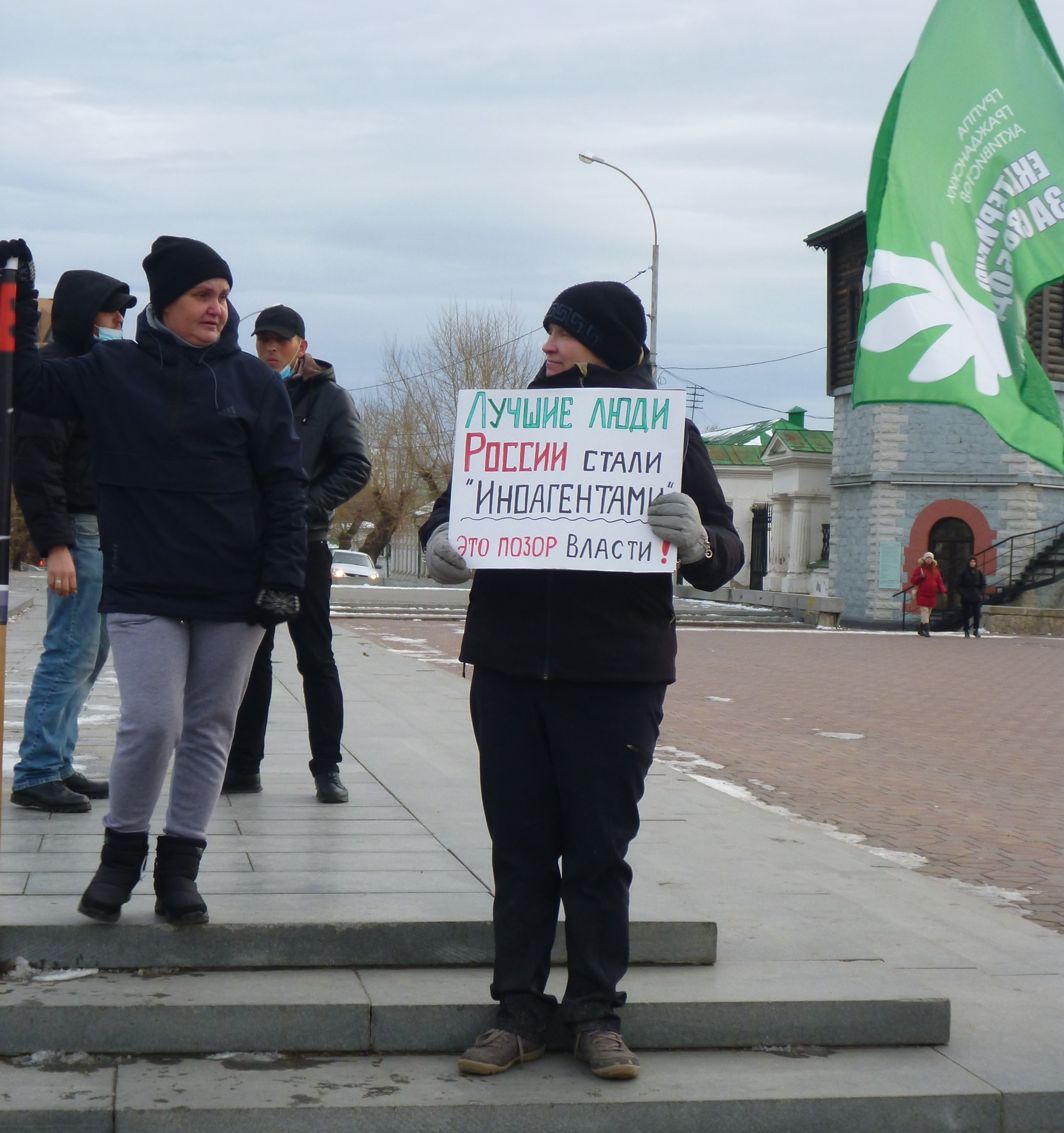
Picket against the foreign agent law in Yekaterinburg, 2021. The sign reads "Russia's finest people have become 'foreign agents'. It's a disgrace."

Russia's human rights commissioner, Vladimir Lukin, and several non-governmental groups filed an appeal with Russia's constitutional court, arguing that the law violated constitutional provisions on freedom of association (Article 30) and that the definitions of political activities and foreign agents in its text were too vague. On 8 April 2014, the court decided that the law did not infringe on the constitutional right to association, and that the foreign agent designation was in the public interest.

In February 2016, the Russian PEN Center issued an open letter protesting amendments to the law which defined political activity as activity aimed at influencing the government or public opinion.

In 2015, the science and education supporting fund Dynasty Foundation run by Dmitry Zimin, founder of Vympelcom, closed after being forced to label itself as a foreign agent. This decision of the Ministry of Justice has sparked a lot of criticism as Dynasty was not involved in politics and fully focused on national education in Russia. It also received no funds from foreign third parties, merely keeping part of their funds on foreign bank accounts. After mass protests of the academic community against this discrimination Zimin attempted appeals and when they remained unsuccessful, he decided to close the fund and left Russia.

The Committee Against Torture also declared the organization would be closed after it lost an appeal against the Ministry of Justice qualifying it as a foreign agent.

Russia's Presidential Council for Human Rights, citing the targeting of Dynasty Foundation and the Committee Against Torture, called upon the Plenum of the Supreme Court to examine the practice of the courts in the application of the law.

According to Human Rights Watch, by August 2016 at least 13 groups chose to shut down rather than wear the foreign agent label.

Since the law was passed in Russia, Transparency International Russia (TI-R) has fought it. In November 2012 the board of TI-R issued a statement declaring the law unconstitutional, claiming it impairs their rights to organize and participate in governance. TI-R claims that the foreign agent law enacted by the Russian government is unconstitutional according to the Russian constitution based on its articles concerning freedom of speech and the right to participate in governance. TI-R was itself placed on the list of foreign agents in 2015.

=== International ===
Secretary General of the Council of Europe Thorbjørn Jagland expressed concerns about the law during a joint news conference with Sergei Lavrov, the Russian foreign minister, stating that "[The law] can have a chilling effect on the NGO community, particularly if this law is not being put into practice in the right manner."

Catherine Ashton, the High Representative of the Union for Foreign Affairs and Security Policy at the European Union, expressed concern about the law and resulting raids, stating that "The inspections and searches launched against the Russian NGO community and conducted on vague legal grounds are worrisome since they seem to be aimed at further undermining civil society in the country."

German Chancellor Angela Merkel publicly rebuked President Putin while he visited Hanover, shortly after Russian officials searched and confiscated documents and equipment from two German NGOs operating in Russia. German Foreign Minister Guido Westerwelle declared the moves against the nonprofits unacceptable and warned through a spokesperson that they could "have a sustained effect on bilateral relations."

The OSCE Parliamentary Assembly in its "Helsinki Declaration" from July 2015 called upon Russia to "end its attempts to stigmatize and discredit civil society groups by labeling them foreign agents".

The Venice Commission of the Council of Europe issued an opinion raising "several serious issues" with the formulation and implementation of the law according to Council of Europe standards. It called upon Russia to reformulate the vague criteria of political activities, and to abandon the term foreign agent, stating that "by bringing back the rhetoric used during the communist period, this term stigmatizes the NCOs to which it is applied, tarnishing their reputation and seriously hampering their activities."

On 6 July 2021, the new opinion of the Venice Commission on Russia's foreign agent law was published. According to the commission's conclusion, the recent amendments to Russia's foreign agent legislation take a clear direction towards expanding the scope of entities and individuals that qualify as foreign agents, as well as expanding the obligations and restrictions on them. The recent amendments also significantly raise sanctions (administrative and criminal) for non-compliance with these regulations. At the same time, they tend to use vague and overly broad terminology and fail to have a reasonable relation to the aims allegedly pursued. As a result, they constitute serious violations of basic human rights, including the freedoms of association and expression, the right to privacy, the right to participate in public affairs, as well as the prohibition of discrimination. The Venice Commission is particularly concerned by the combined effect of the most recent amendments on entities, individuals, the media and civil society more broadly. The Venice Commission warns against the significant chilling effect that the recent reforms are likely to have on the free exercise of the civil and political rights which are vital for an effective democracy. The combined effect of the recent reforms enables authorities to exercise significant control over the activities and existence of associations as well as over the participation of individuals in civic life. The commission recommends that the Russian authorities abandon the special regime of registration, reporting, and public disclosure requirements for associations, media outlets and individuals receiving foreign support, including the related administrative and criminal sanctions. Alternatively, the commission calls on the Russian authorities to thoroughly revise not only the most recent amendments but the entire body of its foreign agent legislation by significantly narrowing the legal definition of a foreign agent in order to serve the stated aim of transparency. Specifically, the notions of "political activities" and "foreign support" should be abandoned in favour of indicators that would reliably track objectionable forms of foreign interference. At a minimum, the stigmatizing and misleading foreign agent label should be abandoned in favour of a more neutral and accurate designation. This new designation should not be used as a criterion for banning individuals from entering public service. Likewise, NCOs and media outlets so designated should not be prohibited from participating in campaign activities. Criminal sanctions, including especially compulsory labour and the deprivation of liberty, should not be applied to breaches of registration, reporting and public disclosure requirements for foreign agents, even under the narrow definition of that designation. Further, the penalty of liquidation of NCOs should be reserved for extreme cases of violations threatening democracy.

The United Nations special rapporteur on the situation of human rights in Russia Mariana Katzarova criticized the new law, which entered into force on 1 December 2022, in her report of 15 September 2023.

== Cases before the European Court of Human Rights ==
=== Ecodefence and Others v. Russia (2022) ===
In the case of Ecodefence and Others v. Russia, the European Court of Human Rights ruled against Russia's controversial "foreign agents" law, which had imposed severe restrictions on independent civil society groups since 2012.

The case involved 73 Russian organizations that were labelled as "foreign agents" by the authorities, including environmental groups, human rights defenders, research centres, and charitable foundations. The law required these organizations to register as "foreign agents" if they received any foreign funding and engaged in broadly defined political activity.

The Court found that the law had been used to target and stigmatize independent groups. Activities such as environmental protection, human rights work, and running HIV prevention programmes were classified as political. Organizations were forced to either reject all foreign funding or accept the foreign agent label, which came with excessive reporting requirements, frequent inspections, and heavy fines.

Many groups were unable to pay the fines or continue their work under the restrictive conditions and were consequently forced to shut down. The Court ruled that Russia had failed to justify the necessity of such measures and concluded that the law's true purpose appeared to be silencing independent civil society voices rather than increasing transparency, as claimed by the authorities.

=== Kobaliya and Others v. Russia (2024) ===
In the follow-up case of Kobaliya and Others v. Russia, the Court ruled against Russia's expanded "foreign agents" legislation, finding it in violation of fundamental rights protected by the European Convention on Human Rights. The case involved applications from over a hundred organizations and individuals designated as "foreign agents" under increasingly restrictive laws introduced between 2017 and 2022.

The Court found that Russia had significantly expanded its "foreign agents" framework beyond non-governmental organizations (NGOs) to include media organizations, journalists, bloggers, and individuals engaged in broadly defined "political activities". The stigmatizing effect of the "foreign agent" label intensified over time, with public opinion polls indicating that the designation was increasingly associated with "traitors" and "enemies of the people". The Court noted that the designation was misleading as it suggested foreign control without evidence, contrasting with similar laws in other countries that require proof of agency relationships.

The regime applied the law in disproportionately severe ways. Examples included designating individuals as "foreign agents" for receiving minimal sums from foreign nationals, such as €3 donations or airline mile exchanges. Organizations faced severe consequences, such as the forced dissolution of International Memorial and Memorial Human Rights Centre over minor labelling violations, and Radio Free Europe/Radio Liberty accumulated hundreds of millions of rubles in fines.

Individuals labelled as foreign agents were subjected to significant privacy intrusions, including the mandatory publication of personal data and detailed financial reporting requirements. They also faced professional restrictions, such as prohibitions on teaching, producing content for minors, and holding public office. The mandatory labelling requirements for all communications, including social media posts, severely restricted freedom of expression.

The Court concluded that Russia's foreign agents framework bore "hallmarks of a totalitarian regime" by fostering an atmosphere of suspicion toward independent voices and civil society. Rather than pursuing its stated aim of transparency, the legislation was found to undermine the foundations of democracy by stigmatizing and silencing independent voices in public debate.

== See also ==
- List of foreign agents in Russia
- 2023–2024 Georgian protests, which stemmed from a Georgian foreign agent law proposal
- List of websites blocked in Russia
