= Faena Arts Center =

Cultural center in Buenos Aires, Argentina

Faena Art Center
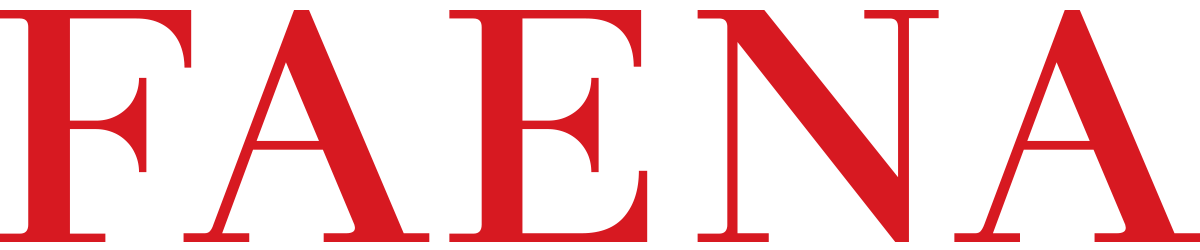

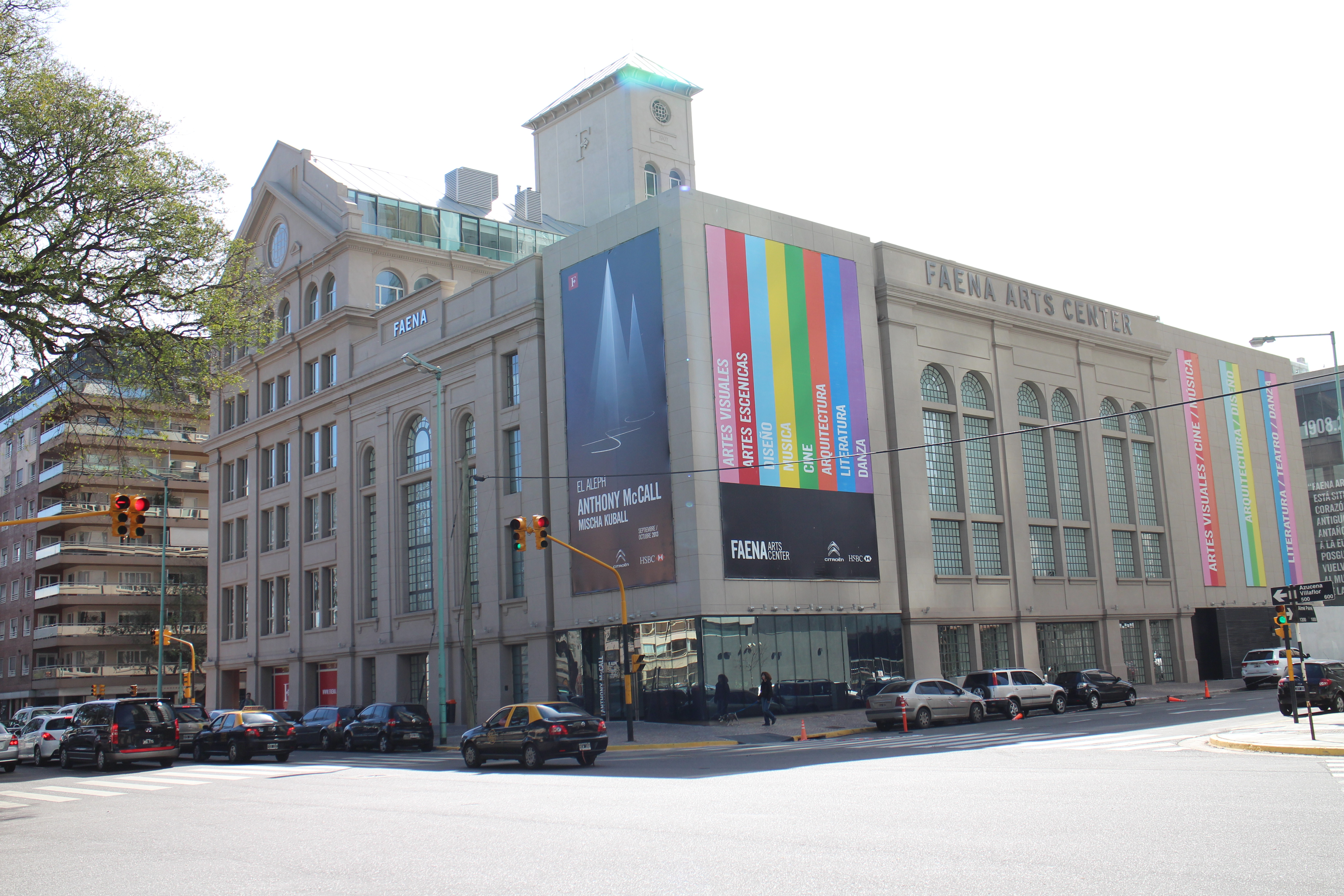
- Exterior view of the Faena Art Center building in Buenos Aires

- Location within Buenos Aires
- Location: Aimé Paine 1169, Puerto Madero, Buenos Aires
- Coordinates: 34.6137°S 58.3616°W
- Type: Arts centre
- Director: Ximena Caminos
- Owner: Faena Group
- Public transit access: Leandro N. Alem (Buenos Aires Metro), Line B (Buenos Aires Metro)
- Website: Faena Arts Center - Official Website

Faena Art Center is the cultural center of the Faena District Buenos Aires, a residential and cultural community in the Puerto Madero waterfront in Buenos Aires developed by the Faena Group and opened in September 2011. Alan Faena founded the center. Ximena Caminos is the Executive Director.

== History of the Building & Renovation ==
Faena Art Center was built out of one of Argentina’s first big flour mills. In what used to be the mill’s old machine room, the main exhibition space has been rebuilt to retain the original details from the 1900s. The spacious, light-filled center, which is over 4,000 m^{2}, is housed by soaring ceilings, semicircular arches, bay windows and other hallmarks of turn-of-the-century industrial architecture.

== Past exhibitions ==
Faena Art Center presents works by international artists in order to create a dialogue with the Argentinean scene, as well as offering local artists the chance to debut. The inaugural exhibition featured a monumental installation by Brazilian contemporary artist Ernesto Neto, curated by the Tate Modern’s Jessica Morgan. In May 2012, the Cuban duo Los Carpinteros debuted their first solo in Buenos Aires. In November 2012, German artist Franz Ackermann exhibited the results of his voyages around Buenos Aires with the largest mural of his career, also his first show in Buenos Aires.

In the year 2018 the Faena Art Center made only one exhibition, which was open to the public only four days and without previous announcements. Currently the Faena Art Center does not offer open public exhibitions.

== Faena Prize for the Arts ==
Faena Prize for the Arts is one of the largest art prizes in Latin America and is led by Ximena Caminos. It aims to foster artistic experimentation, encourage crossover between disciplines, and promote new explorations of the links between art, technology, and design. The competition is open to all artists all over the world, and it is also open to work in different media (installations, performances, paintings, sculptures, photographs, works that include design and architecture, film or video pieces, or combination of the aforementioned disciplines) to create a project that responds or occupies the center’s space in a significant way.

=== 2012 Edition ===
The 2012 Faena Prize for the Arts winner was awarded to Argentinean visual artist, Franco Dario Vico. The 2012 jury included US based Carlos Basualdo, curator of contemporary art at the Philadelphia Museum of Art, Paris-based Caroline Bourgeois, curator at the Artis/Francois Pinault Foundation, and Buenos Aires based curator Ines Katzenstein, director of the art department at the Torcuato Di Tella University, under the supervision of Ximena Caminos, Executive Director of the Faena Arts Center.

The artist received a grant of $25,000 as well as up to $50,000 to finance the production of a site-specific project exhibited at the Faena Arts Center in 2013.

=== 2015 Edition ===
The 2015 winner of the Prize is Los Angeles-based artist Cayetano Ferrer who was awarded $75,000 in total. $50,000 is for production of his proposed site-specific work for the Sala Molinos exhibition space in the Faena Art Center.
