= Alliance of Doctors =

Russian labor union of doctors and physicians

The Alliance of Doctors (Russian: Альянс врачей, romanized: Alyans vrachey) is a Russian labor union of doctors and physicians. It was founded in 2018. The alliance's stated goal is to protect the rights of medical workers across Russia. The alliance is headed by ophthalmologist Anastasia Vasilyeva, who had treated Russian opposition leader Alexei Navalny. It also fights for fair wages and working conditions for medical professionals.

Alliance of Doctors was added to the Russian foreign agent law list in March 2021.

== History ==
The alliance was established and registered in 2018. In May 2020 the alliance released an interactive map detailing the problems of hospitals in Russia during the COVID-19 pandemic.

On 3 March 2021 the Russian Ministry of Justice added the alliance to its list of foreign agents, alleging that the alliance received foreign funding and was engaged in political activity.

On 2 April 2021 the alliance's members announced that they would demonstrate outside Navalny's prison on 6 April unless he receives the doctor of his choice and the medicine he needs by 5 April.

On April 15, 2021, Anastasia Tarabrina, deputy chairman of Alliance of Doctors, resigned from it, justifying this by the excessive politicization of the trade union, and created a new trade union, Voice of Medicine, which is supposed to deal only with medical issues.

In September 2021, the chairman of Alliance of Doctors, Anastasia Vasilyeva, announced that the union was no longer associated with Anti-Corruption Foundation and Navalny's projects.
