= Confederation of Labour of Russia =

National trade union center in Russia

KTR
- Confederation of Labour of Russia
- Founded: 12 April 1995
- Headquarters: Moscow, Russia
- Location: Russia
- Members: 1.25 million
- Affiliations: ITUC
- Website: (www.ktr.su)

The Confederation of Labour of Russia (KTR) is a national trade union center in Russia. It was founded on 12 April 1995 and is affiliated with the International Trade Union Confederation.
