= List of foreign agents in Russia =

A "foreign agent" in Russia is a designation by the Russian government for persons or entities it deems have received funding from abroad while participating in political activities in Russia, disseminating information in mass media, or collecting military-technical information within the borders of the Russian Federation.

== Foreign agents in Russia ==
The state imposes a number of restrictions and requirements on the activities of foreign agents. As of March 2021, foreign agents in Russia are divided into three groups, which were defined by law in different years:

- Non-profit organizations-foreign agents - since 2012.
- Media-foreign agents - since 2017.
- Individuals-foreign agents from 2020. An individual - "foreign agent" may be additionally recognized by the media, which entails for him the obligation to register the corresponding legal entity.
- Unregistered public associations-foreign agents - from 2021.

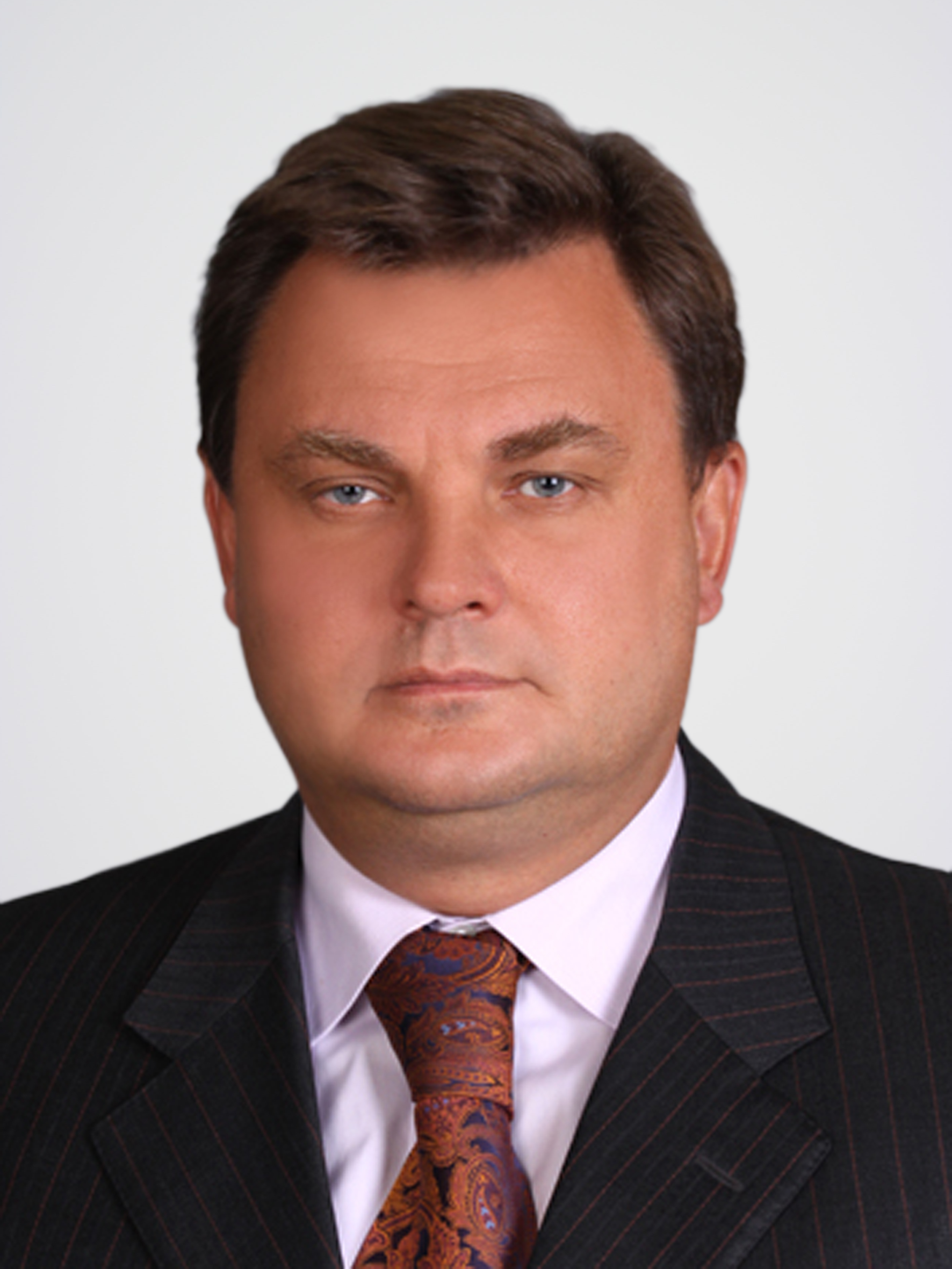
Konstantin Chuychenko, Russian Minister of Justice

Registers (lists) of foreign agents are maintained by the Ministry of Justice of the Russian Federation (Minister since 2020 - Konstantin Chuychenko), adding information to them or deleting organizations from there.

The law provides for the obligation of an organization performing the functions of a foreign agent to independently report this to the Ministry of Justice, initiating its inclusion in the register. However, the Ministry of Justice of the Russian Federation may establish the status of an NPO as a "foreign agent" on its own initiative and require the NPO to apply for inclusion in the register. If an NPO refuses to submit such an application, the Ministry of Justice has the right to fine the organization or suspend its work for up to six months. The decision of the Ministry of Justice can be challenged in court.

Starting from 1 December 2022, a unified register of foreign agents is maintained.

== History ==
Since the inclusion in the register was seen by many as placing a negative label on NGOs, which damaged their reputation and presented NGOs as a kind of hostile element (due to the interpretation of the phrase "foreign agent" as a synonym for the phrase "foreign spy"), after the adoption of the law, NGOs were not particularly active fulfilled his requirements. Thus, as of 1 August 2014, only 11 organizations were included in the register, despite the fact that officials, just four months after the adoption of the law, announced 654 organizations - potential candidates for being included in the list..At the same time, although a number of experts point out the need to account for "foreign agents" as lobbyists, it is believed that damage to reputation persists even after the organization is excluded from the register.

In the future, the number of NGOs in the register began to increase. So, as of March 2017, there were already 102 organizations in the register, while some of them managed to achieve a formal exclusion. However, the Ministry of Justice continued to list them on its website, indicating the date and reason for the termination of the status of "foreign agent". The maintenance of the register was regulated by a departmental order of the Ministry of Justice, which did not provide for the complete deletion of information, and, moreover, was applied inconsistently. So, in October 2015, information about organizations that were excluded from it briefly disappeared from the register, but then this information quickly returned to the register.As a result, in January 2016, the Kostroma Center for the Support of Public Initiatives appealed to the Supreme Court against the order of the Ministry of Justice on the procedure for maintaining the register of non-profit organizations performing the functions of a "foreign agent", stating that it contradicts the federal law on NGOs and that the continued presence in the published register of an organization that ceased to perform the functions of a "foreign agent", damages its business reputation. As a result of legal proceedings, despite the initial position of the Ministry of Justice on the compliance of this procedure for maintaining the register with the law, the order was corrected, and information about organizations that ceased to perform the functions of a "foreign agent" was completely excluded from the register in March 2017. The columns on the date and reason for the exclusion in the registry itself remained.

In 2023, the European Court of Human Rights ruled that the law violates fundamental rights and bears "hallmarks of a totalitarian regime" by creating an environment of suspicion toward independent voices.

== Statistics ==
According to Deutsche Welle, out of 200 NGOs recognized as "foreign agents" from 2013 to February 2021, 45 no longer perform the functions of a "foreign agent", 56 have voluntarily dissolved themselves, 16 have been liquidated by the court, 8 have been excluded from the Unified State Register of Legal Entities and 75 remain in the register. The following profiles are in the registry:

- 15 — human rights
- 14 — civic education,
- 8 — fight against HIV,
- 7 — media support,
- 7 — helping those in need,
- 23 — other.

Among them are 25 organizations from Moscow, 13 from St. Petersburg, 7 from Yekaterinburg and 30 from other regions of Russia.

== Lists of foreign agents ==
Foreign agents include:

=== Nonprofit organizations ===
The entry into the register occurred with reference to Article 32 of the Federal Law of 12 January 1996 No. 7-FZ "On Non-Commercial Organizations".

№	Name	Date of inclusion in the register	Date of inclusion in the register
79	Eurasian Antimonopoly Association	27 June 2013	
76	Interregional public organization Human Rights Center "Memorial"	21 July 2014	
	Kaliningrad regional public organization "Ecoprotection! - Women's Council"	21 July 2014	
	Foundation for Assistance to the Protection of Citizens' Rights and Freedoms "Public Verdict"	21 July 2014	
	Foundation "Institute for the Development of Freedom of Information"	28 August 2014	
	Private institution "Information Agency MEMO.RU"	20 November 2014	
	Non-profit partnership "Institute of Regional Press"	20 November 2014	25 March 2022
	Regional public organization "Public Commission for the Preservation of the Heritage of Academician Sakharov"	25 December 2014	
	Press Freedom Foundation	30 December 2014	
	St. Petersburg public human rights organization "Civil Control"	30 December 2014	
	Interregional public human rights organization "Man and the Law"	30 December 2014	
	Interregional public organization Information and Educational Center "Memorial"	16 January 2015	
	"Private institution in St. Petersburg for administrative support for the implementation of programs and projects of the Nordic Council of Ministers"	20 January 2015	6 December 2022
	Non-profit partnership "Press Development Institute - Siberia"	30 January 2015	
	Regional Foundation Center for the Protection of Media Rights		

=== Individuals listed as media foreign agents ===
The entry into the register occurred with reference to Article 6 of the Federal Law of 27 December 1991 № 2124-1 "About the media".

№	Name	Occupation	date of inclusion in the register	date of inclusion in the register
1	Lev Aleksandrovich Ponomaryov	Political and civil rights activist	28 December 2020	
2	Lyudmila Alekseevna Savitskaya	Journalist for Radio Svoboda and MBKh Media	28 December 2020	
3	Sergey Evgenevich Markelov	Journalist for 7x7	28 December 2020	
4	Denis Nikolaevich Kamalyagin	Journalist, editor-in-chief of The Pskov Governorate (or "Pskovskaya Guberniya")	28 December 2020	
5	Darya Aleksandrovna Apakhonchich	Artist, feminist activist	28 December 2020	
6	Roman Sergeevich Badanin	Founder, editor-in-chief of Proekt	15 July 2021	
7	Maksim Alexandrovich Glikin	Deputy chief editor of Open Media	15 July 2021	
8	Pyotr Borisovich Manyakhin	Journalist for Proekt		
9	Yulia Petrovna Yarosh	Former editor-in-chief of Open Media	15 July 2021	
10	Olga Vladimirovna Churakova	Journalist for Proekt	15 July 2021	
11	Mariia Mihaylovna Zheleznova	Journalist for Proekt	15 July 2021	
12	Yulia Sergeevna Lukyanova	Journalist for Proekt	15 July 2021	
13	Yelizaveta Vitalevna Mayetnaya	Editor and journalist for Radio Free Europe/Radio Liberty	15 July 2021	
14	Mikhail Arkadevich Rubin	Former deputy editor for Proekt	23 July 2021	
15	Sofia Romanovna Grojsman	Journalist for Proekt	23 July 2021	
16	Ilya Dmitrievich Rozhdestvensky	Journalist for Open Media	23 July 2021	
17	Yuliya Vladimirovna Apukhtina	Journalist for Proekt	23 July 2021	
18	Aleksei Evgenevich Posternak	Journalist for Radio Free Europe/Radio Liberty	23 July 2021	
19	Stepan Yurevich Petrov	Head of the human rights organization "Yakutia - Our Opinion"	20 August 2021	
20	Olesya Valentinovna Shmagun	Founder, former editor for IStories	20 August 2021	
21	Alesya Alekseevna Marohovskaya	Journalist, editor for IStories	20 August 2021	
22	Irina Nikolaevna Dolinina	Journalist for IStories	20 August 2021	
23	Roman Yurevich Shleynov	Journalist for iStories	20 August 2021	
24	Roman Aleksandrovich Anin	Editor-in-chief of iStories	20 August 2021	
25	Dmitriy Aleksandrovich Velikovskiy	Journalist for iStories	20 August 2021	
26	Veronika Vyacheslavovna Katkova	Coordinator for Golos, an election monitoring organization	29 September 2021	
27	Inna Pavlovna Karezina	Coordinator for Golos	29 September 2021	
28	Lyudmila Gavrilovna Kuzmina	Coordinator for Golos	29 September 2021	29 April 2022
29	Polina Vladimirovna Kostyleva	Coordinator for Golos	29 September 2021	23 August 2022
30	Aleksandr Ivanovich Lyutov	Coordinator for Golos	29 September 2021	6 May 2022
31	Vladimir Vladimirovich Zhilkin	Coordinator for Golos	29 September 2021	6 May 2022
32	Vladimir Aleksandrovich Zhilinsky	Coordinator for Golos	29 September 2021	
33	Mikhail Sergeevich Tikhonov	Coordinator for Golos	29 September 2021	
34	Sergey Evgenevich Piskunov	Coordinator for Golos	29 September 2021	
35	Vitaly Sergeevich Kovin	Coordinator for Golos	29 September 2021	5 October 2022
36	Ekaterina Viktorovna Kiltau	Coordinator for Golos	29 September 2021	
37	Arkady Efimovich Lyubarev	Golos council member	29 September 2021	29 April 2022
38	Yurij Albertovich Gurman	Golos council member	29 September 2021	
39	Aleksander Viktorovich Grezev	Coordinator for Golos	29 September 2021	6 May 2022
40	Artiom Valerevich Vazhenkov	Coordinator for Golos	29 September 2021	
41	Sofia Yurevna Ivanova	Coordinator for Golos	29 September 2021	
42	Ilya Valerevich Pigalkin	Coordinator for Golos	29 September 2021	6 May 2022
43	Alexei Viktorovich Petrov	Coordinator for Golos	29 September 2021	
44	Vladimir Vladimirovich Egorov	Coordinator for Golos	29 September 2021	
45	Andrei Yurevich Gusev	Coordinator for Golos	29 September 2021	
46	Sergey Smirnov	Editor-in-chief of Mediazona	29 September 2021	
47	Pyotr Yurievich Verzilov	publisher for Mediazona	29 September 2021	
48	Tatyana Anatolevna Voltskaya	Journalist for Radio Free Europe/Radio Liberty	8 October 2021	
49	Ekaterina Dmitrievna Klepikovskaya	Journalist for Radio Free Europe/Radio Liberty	8 October 2021	
50	Daniil Vladimirovich Sotnikov	Journalist for TV Rain	8 October 2021	
51	Andrey Vyacheslavovich Zakharov	Journalist for BBC News Russian	8 October 2021	
52	Yevgeny Alekseevich Simonov	Environmental activist, founder of Ukraine War Environmental Consequences	8 October 2021	
53	Elizaveta Dmitrievna Surnacheva	Journalist for Current Time TV	8 October 2021	
54	Elena Anatolevna Solovyova	Journalist for Novaya Gazeta	8 October 2021	
55	Galina Yurevna Arapova	Director of the Mass Media Defence Centre, lawyer, jurist	8 October 2021	
56	Roman Aleksandrovich Perl	Journalist for Current Time TV	8 October 2021	
57	Maksim Aleksandrovich Zagovora	Head of media department of Team 29, an association of lawyers and journalists	8 November 2021	
58	Valeriya Valerevna Vetoshkina	Lawyer at Team 29	8 November 2021	
59	Ivan Yuryevich Pavlov	Founder, head lawyer of Team 29	8 November 2021	
60	Elena Sergeevna Skvorcova	Social media marketing editor for Team 29	8 November 2021	
61	Maxim Vladimirovich Olenichev	Lawyer at Team 29	8 November 2021	
62	Igor Viktorovich Kochetkov	Co-founder of the Russian LGBT Network, gay rights activist	12 November 2021	
63	Oleg Aleksandrovich Yelanchik	Editor-in-chief of Sota.Vision	26 November 2021	
64	Alina Aleksandrovna Grigorieva	Journalist for Radio Free Europe/Radio Liberty and Idel.Realities		
65	Andrej Valerevich Grigoriev	Journalist for Radio Free Europe/Radio Liberty and Idel.Realities	3 December 2021	
66	Regina Emilevna Gimalova	Former journalist for Radio Free Europe/Radio Liberty and Idel.Realities	3 December 2021	
67	Regina Faritovna Khisamova	Journalist for Radio Free Europe/Radio Liberty and Idel.Realities	3 December 2021	
68	Marat Aleksandrovich Gelman	Publicist, gallerist	30 December 2021	
69	Viktor Anatolyevich Shenderovich	Publicist	30 December 2021	
70	Ivan Mihajlovich Belyaev	Journalist for "Radio Liberty"	30 December 2021	
71	Elena Sergeevna Vladykina	Journalist for "Radio Liberty"	30 December 2021	
72	Taisiya Lvovna Bekbulatova	Editor-in-chief for "Holod Media"	30 December 2021	
73	Nadezhda Andreyevna Tolokonnikova	Activist in "Pussy Riot"	30 December 2021	
74	Veronika Yurevna Nikulshina	Activist in "Pussy Riot"	30 December 2021	
75	Andrej Viktorovich Alekseev	Distributor	30 December 2021	
76	Aleksándra Aleksándrovna Agéeva	Founder of Sota.Vision	11 February 2022	
77	Anna Lvovna Golubeva	Head of the center "LGBTQIA Resource Moscow"	1 April 2022	
78	Alla Mihajlovna Konstantinova	Reporter for "Mediazona"	1 April 2022	
79	Maria Mikhailovna Borzunova	Journalist for "TV Rain"	1 April 2022	
80	Murad Abdulgalimovich Muradov	Journalist for weekly magazine "New Deal"	1 April 2022	
81	Irina Vladimirovna Malkova	Editor-in-chief in "The Bell"	1 April 2022	
82	Yelizaveta Nikolayevna Osetinskaya	Journalist, founder of "The Bell"	1 April 2022	
83	Yevgeni Nikolayevich Ponasenkov	Historian, Publicist, video blogger	1 April 2022	
84	Victor Victorovich Vorobyov	Opposition politician, deputy of the State Council of the Komi Republic of the VII convocation	1 April 2022	
85	Ivan Timofeyevich Dryomin	Rapper, singer	1 April 2022	
86	Irina Grigorevna Boruhovich (Tumakova)	Journalist for "Novaya Gazeta"	8 April 2022	
87	Mark Zakharovich Feygin	Politician, journalist	8 April 2022	
88	Ekaterina Alekseevna Mayakovskaya	Journalist, volunteer for Golos	8 April 2022	
89	Andrej Viktorovich Filimonov	Journalist for "Radio Liberty", "Siberia.Realities"	8 April 2022	
90	Dmitrij Viktorovich Dubrovskij	Civil activist, researcher, expert	8 April 2022	
91	Regina Nikolaevna Dzugkoeva	Leader of the movement "Lighthouse"	15 April 2022	
92	Karén Bagrátovich Shainyán	LGBT video blogger	15 April 2022	
93	Ekaterina Mikhailovna Schulmann	Political scientist, Publicist	15 April 2022	
94	Mariya Leonidovna Sabunaeva	LGBT psychologist, writer	15 April 2022	
95	Aleksej Vladimirovich Semyonov	Journalist, former columnist for "The Pskov Governorate"	15 April 2022	
96	Yury Aleksandrovich Dud	Video blogger, journalist	15 April 2022	
97	Kirill Igorevich Kruglikov	Journalist for "Takie dela"	15 April 2022	
98	Roman Aleksandrovich Dobrokhotov	Editor-in-chief of "The Insider"	15 April 2022	
99	Sergej Vladimirovich Yolkin	Artist, cartoonist	15 April 2022	
100	Viktor Semyonovich Vahshtajn	Sociologist, editor-in-chief in the magazine "Sociology of the Authority"	22 April 2022	
101	Yaroslav Nikolaevich Sirotkin	Civil and LGBT activist, member of the LGBT "Callisto" movement	22 April 2022	
102	Sergey Borisovich Parkhomenko	Journalist	22 April 2022	
103	Artur Valerevich Asafev	Journalist for "Radio Liberty"	22 April 2022	
104	Alexander Glebovich Nevzorov	Journalist	22 April 2022	
105	Ekaterina Evgenevna Lushnikova	Journalist for "Radio Liberty"	22 April 2022	
106	Alexei Alexeyevich Venediktov	Editor-in-chief in "Echo of Moscow"	22 April 2022	
107	Vladimir Vladimirovich Voronov	Journalist for "Radio Liberty"	22 April 2022	7 October 2022
108	Vladimir Stanislavovich Milov	Politician, economist	6 May 2022	
109	Boris Yulyevich Kagarlitsky	Sociologist, Publicist	6 May 2022	
110	Leonid Yakovlevich Gozman	Psychologist, activist	6 May 2022	
111	Lyubov Eduardovna Sobol	Politician	6 May 2022	
112	Mihail Valerevich Klimarev	IT-expert, activist	6 May 2022	
113	Natalya Vladimirovna Baranova	Content director for "Greenhouse of social technologies"	6 May 2022	
114	Denis Vladimirovich Konstantinov	Editor-in-chief for "Orlov's news"	6 May 2022	
115	Mihaíl Vladímirovich Sokolóv	Journalist for "Radio Liberty", historian, radio host, political commentator	3 June 2022	
116	Alexey Vladimirovich Pivovarov	Journalist, blogger	3 June 2022	
117	Yulia Vladimirovna Tsvetkova	Artist, activist	3 June 2022	
118	Oleg Vladimirovich Kashin	Political journalist, Publicist, columnist, writer	3 June 2022	
119	Nikolaj Vladimirovich Petrov	Political scientist, political geographist	3 June 2022	
120	Irina Bronislavovna Danilovich	Activitst	3 June 2022	
121	Dmitrij Petrovich Aleshkóvskij	Social activist, journalist	29 July 2022	
122	Dmitrij Lvovich Bykov	Writer, Publicist	29 July 2022	
123	Yevgenia Markovna Albats	Journalist	29 July 2022	
124	Kirill Vladimirovich Fedorov	Psychologist, human rights activist	2 September 2022	
125	Kirill Konstantinovich Martynov	Editor-in-chief for "Novaya Gazeta Europe", Publicist	2 September 2022	
126	Sergey Leonidovich Loiko	Journalist	2 September 2022	
127	Yulia Yevgenyevna Galyamina	Politician	2 September 2022	
128	Mikhail Grigoryevich Shats	Showman, TV presenter	2 September 2022	
129	Sergei Aleksandrovich Medvedev	Political scientist	2 September 2022	
130	Valery Dmitriyevich Solovei	Historian, political scientist	9 September 2022	
131	Elena Viktorovna Shukaeva	Journalist for "Radio Liberty"	9 September 2022	
132	Andrej Andreevich Afanasev	Journalist for "Radio Liberty" and "SOTA.Vision"	9 September 2022	
133	Iskender Gabdrahmanovich Yasaveev	Sociologist, columnist for Idel.Realities, activist	7 October 2022	
134	Evgeniya Semenovna Baltatarova	Journalist, social activist	7 October 2022	
135	Dmitry Alekseyevich Glukhovsky	Writer	7 October 2022	
136	Ivan Alekseevich Zhadaev	Journalist, former editor of the "MBX-Media"	14 October 2022	
137	Kirill Evgenevich Haratyan	Journalist, professor of the RANEPA	14 October 2022	
138	Vladimir Vladimirovich Ruvinskij	Journalist, former editor-in-chief of the website "Echo of Moscow"	14 October 2022	
139	Veronika Iosifovna Kucyllo	Journalist, former editor-in-chief of the "MBX-Media"	14 October 2022	
140	Anton Vladimirovich Dolin	Film critic	14 October 2022	
141	Nataliya Gennadevna Telegina	Journalist	14 October 2022	
142	Mikhail Viktorovich Zygar	Journalist, writer	21 October 2022	
143	Aleksej Alekseevich Dokuchaev	Founder of the publishing house "Individuum"	28 October 2022	
144	Andrej Sergeevich Baev	Director of the service "Bookmate"	28 October 2022	
145	Irek Damirovich Bikkinin	Journalist, social activist	18 November 2022	
146	Dmitry Evgenievich Kolezev	Journalist, editor-in-chief of "Republic"	18 November 2022	
147	Lyubov Grigorevna Barabashova	Journalist for "Radio Liberty", "Siberia.Realities"	25 November 2022	
148	Rovshan Enver ogly Askerov	Journalist	9 December 2022	
149	Ruben Grantovich Apresyan	Philosopher	9 December 2022	
150	Mikhail Vladimirovich Fishman	Journalist	9 December 2022	
151	Rostislav Rafkatovich Murzagulov	Political scientist, political strategist, journalist, writer	9 December 2022	
152	Yuliya Leonidovna Taratuta	Journalist, editor-in-chief of "Wonderzine"	16 December 2022	
153	Ivan Ivanovich Tyutrin	Journalist, oppositioner, social activist	16 December 2022	
154	Dmitrij Aleksandrovich Lyubimov	Journalist	16 December 2022	
155	Dmitrij Viktorovich Davydov	Businessman	16 December 2022	
156	Natalya Vladimirovna Gryaznevich	Deputy	16 December 2022	
157	Anastasiya Nikolaevna Zhvik	Journalist	16 December 2022	
158	Svetlana Alekseevna Gannushkina	Social activist	23 December 2022	
159	Gléb Valentínovich Pyanýh	Journalist, TV presenter, video blogger	23 December 2022	
160	Andrey Vladimirovich Kolesnikov	Journalist, political scientist	23 December 2022	
161	Artemy Kivovich Troitsky	Journalist	23 December 2022	
162	Artur Sergeyevich Smolyaninov	Actor	13 January 2023	
163	Sergej Vladimirovich Kirsanov		13 January 2023	
164	Anatolij Vladimirovich Fursov	Jurist	13 January 2023	
165	Sergej Anatolevich Uhov	Creator of the regional media "Perm 36.6", ex-coordinator of Navalny's headquarters in the Perm region	13 January 2023	
166	Aleksandr Shelest	Journalist	13 January 2023	
167	Elizaveta Andreevna Gyrdymova	Singer, musician, composer, songwriter	20 January 2023	
168	Vladimir Valeryevich Osechkin	Social activist, founder of the social project "Gulagu.net"	20 January 2023	
169	Anton Mihajlovich Pikuli (Ustimov)	Video blogger	20 January 2023	
170	Ibragim Hasanbievich Yaganov	Political and social activist	20 January 2023	
171	Vadim Mihajlovich Harchenko	Blogger	20 January 2023	
172	Dárya Stanislávovna Besédina	Urbanist, deputy of the Moscow City Duma of the 7th convocation	20 January 2023	
173	Ilya Vladimirovich Prusikin	Musician, singer, music producer, video blogger, director and leader of the band Little Big	20 January 2023	
174	Fidel Eduardovich Agumava	Journalist	27 January 2023	
175	Erdne-Basan Ombadykow	President of the Association of Buddhists of Kalmykia	27 January 2023	
176	Rafis Rafailovich Kashapov	Social activist	27 January 2023	
177	Daria Andreyevna Serenko	Social activist, curator, poet, actor	27 January 2023	
178	Pavel Vladimirovich Mezerin	Political scientist, analytic, journalist, coordinator of the movement "Free Ingria"	3 February 2023	
179	Nikolaj Yurevich Sobolev	Video blogger, writer, businessman, singer	3 February 2023	
180	Aleksandr Yurevich Makashenec	Journalist	3 February 2023	
181	Ekaterina Arturovna Dudko	Writer	3 February 2023	
182	Elena Vladimirovna Prokasheva	Writer	3 February 2023	
183	Zemfira Talgatovna Ramazanova	Musician	3 February 2023	
184	Dmitry Gennadyevich Gudkov	Politician	10 February 2023	
185	Tatyana Valerevna Namazbaeva	Activist	10 February 2023	
186	Sergei Stepanovich Aslanyan	Journalist	10 February 2023	
187	Sergej Aleksandrovich Shpilkin	Physicist	10 February 2023	
188	Anna Valerevna Rivina	Social activist	10 February 2023	
189	Aleksandra Nikolaevna Kazanceva	Social activist	10 February 2023	
190	Andrey Borisovich Zubov	Scientist	17 February 2023	
191	Andrei Borisovich Loshak	Journalist	17 February 2023	
192	Danil Evgenevich Gubarev	Journalist	10 March 2023	
193	Sergey Maratovich Guriyev	Economist	10 March 2023	
194	Lev Mihajlovich Gershenzon	Media-manager	10 March 2023	
195	Gennady Vladimirovich Gudkov	Video blogger, journalist, social activist	10 March 2023	
196	Nika Wodwood	Feminist blogger	10 March 2023	
197	Ilya Aleksandrovich Varlamov	Video blogger, journalist, social activist	23 March 2023	
198	Pavel Vladimirovich Chikov	Jurist, social activist	23 March 2023	
199	Ruslan Valerevich Ajsin	Political scientist, social activist	23 March 2023	
200	Svetlana Mihajlovna Lada-Rus	Social activist	23 March 2023	
201	Bogdan Vladimirovich Bakalejko	Journalist	23 March 2023	
202	Maksim Sergeyevich Pokrovsky	Singer, composer, songwriter, cinema & theatre actor	31 March 2023	
203	Sergej Andreevich Bojko	Journalist	31 March 2023	
204	Georgij Rostislavovich Chentemirov	Journalist	31 March 2023	
205	Arkady Arkadyevich Babchenko	Journalist	7 April 2023	
206	Semyon Sergeyevich Slepakov	Comedian, scriptwriter, producer, poet, musician, songwriter	14 April 2023	
207	Igor Aleksandrovich Yakovenko	Journalist, sociologist	14 April 2023	
208	Pavel Andreevich Muntyan	Cartoonist, producer, scriptwriter	14 April 2023	
209	Kanygin Pavel Yurevich	Journalist, investigative reporter	14 April 2023	
210	Christo Grozev	Bulgarian investigative reporter, media expert, media investor	21 April 2023	
211	Natalya Fedorovna Sevec-Ermolina	Journalist, blogger	21 April 2023	
212	Elvira Vladimirovna Vihareva	Journalist, blogger	21 April 2023	
213	Yan Andreevich Matveev	Political scientist	5 May 2023	
214	Aleksandr Avraamovich Osovcov	Political activist	5 May 2023	
215	Ivan Sergeevich Preobrazhenskij	Political scientist	5 May 2023	
216	Georgy Valentinovich Alburov	Political and social activist, blogger	5 May 2023	
217	Maria Petrovna Maksakova Jr.	Opera singer	5 May 2023	
218	Maria Konstantinovna Pevchikh	Investigative reporter	5 May 2023	
219	Vladimir Borisovitch Pastukhov	Political scientist, Publicist, jurist	5 May 2023	
220	Elena Vladimirovna Agafonova	Social activist	5 May 2023	
221	Egor Mihajlovich Bortnik	Musician, poet, vocalist, guitarist	26 May 2023	
222	Irina Vladimirovna Alleman	Blogger	26 May 2023	
223	Vladislav Leonidovich Inozemtsev	Economist, sociologist, political activist	26 May 2023	
224	Sergej Andreevich Chernyshov	Director of Novokolledzh LLC, founder of ANO PO Novokolledzh	26 May 2023	
225	Aleksandra Sergeevna Arkhipova	Anthropologist	26 May 2023	
226	Aleksandr Tamerlanovich Gabuev	Orientalist	26 May 2023	
227	Anna Eduardovna Pshenichnaya	Journalist	26 May 2023	
228	Olga Viktorovna Cukanova	Leader of the movement "Council of Mothers and Wives"	26 May 2023	
229	Magomed Tazhudinovich Gadzhiyev	Political and public figure. State Deputy Dumas of the Federal Assembly of the Russian Federation of the IV, V, VI and VII convocations	26 May 2023	
230	Dmitry Borisovich Oreshkin	Political scientist	2 June 2023	
231	Roman Vladimirovich Super	Journalist	2 June 2023	
232	Maksim Rafikovich Kuzahmetov	Historian	2 June 2023	
233	Lev Markovich Shlosberg	Social & political activist	16 June 2023	
234	Sergey Vladimirovich Aleksashenko	Economist	16 June 2023	
235	Vitaly Vsevolodovich Mansky	Documentary filmmaker	16 June 2023	
236	Svetlana Prokopyeva	Journalist	16 June 2023	
237	Yuliya Borisovna Paramonova	Journalist for "North.Realities"	16 June 2023	
238	Leonid Borisovich Nevzlin	Entrepreneur, social activist	23 June 2023	
239	Ilya Aleksandrovich Kolmanovskij	Scientific journalist, science popularisator	23 June 2023	
240	Mikhail Sergeyevich Lobanov	Mathematician, social activist	23 June 2023	
241	Vitalij Viktorovich Bovar	Opposition politician, ex-deputy head of the Vladimir District (St. Petersburg)	23 June 2023	
242	Robert Ramilevich Latypov	Social activist, chairman of the Perm branch of the International society "Memorial"	23 June 2023	
243	Aleksandr Elenovich Belik	Lawyer, human rights activist, coordinator of the Conscientious Objector Movement	23 June 2023	
244	Yevgeny Viktorovich Stupin	Opposition politician, deputy of the Moscow City Duma of the 7th convocation	23 June 2023	
245	Boris Borisovich Grebenshchikov	Poet, musician, composer, singer	30 June 2023	
246	Mikhail Leonidovich Timonov	Opposition politician, deputy of the Moscow City Duma of the 7th convocation	30 June 2023	
247	Andrej Zinovevich Morev	Opposition politician, ex-head of the Yakimanka municipal district (Moscow)	30 June 2023	
248	Goldshmidt Filipp (Pinhas)	Former chief rabbi of Moscow	30 June 2023	
249	Aleksej Vyacheslavovich Gorpinchenko	Journalist	30 June 2023	
250	Andrej Viktorovich Karaulov	Journalist, TV presenter	30 June 2023	
251	Konstantin Natanovich Borovoi	Politician, entrepreneur	21 July 2023	
252	Mihail Natanovich Kozyrev	Journalist, music crtitc, producer	21 July 2023	
253	Pavel Vasilievich Sulyandziga	Social activist	21 July 2023	
254	Aleksandr Sergeevich Litvinov	Journalist	21 July 2023	
255	Andrey Andreyevich Piontkovsky	Mathematician, political scientist, Publicist	18 August 2023	
256	Tatyana Aleksandrovna Sotnikova	Writer	18 August 2023	
257	Linor Goralik	Writer, poet, translator, author of comic strips	18 August 2023	
258	Sergej Vladimirovich Krivenko	Member of the Board of the International Society "Memorial", director of the Human Rights Group "Citizen. Army. Right".	18 August 2023	
259	Andrey Nikolayevich Illarionov	Economist and politician, public figure, founder and president of the Russian non-profit organization Institute of Economic Analysis.	18 August 2023	
260	Sargylana Konstantinovna Kondakova	Teacher, founder of the Free Yakutia Foundation	18 August 2023	
261	Vladimir Anatolevich Dovdanov	Assistant to the State Duma deputy	18 August 2023	
262	Alexander Andreevich Shtefanov	Historian, video blogger	25 August 2023	
263	Yekaterina Duntsova	Independent candidate against Vladimir Putin in the 2024 election	31 May 2024	
264	Farida Kurbangaleeva	Russian journalist and former television anchor	11 February 2025	
265	Elizaveta Borisovna Alexandrova-Zorina	Russian journalist and writer	21 February 2025	
266	Peter Ruzavin	Russian journalist and Soldier in Armed Forces of Ukraine	19 June 2026	
