= Sergei Saveliev =

Russian programmer and whistleblower (born 1989)

Sergei Saveliev (also Sergey Savelyev, Sergei Savelyev, Sergueï Saveliev, Belarusian: Сяргей Уладзіміравіч Савельеў, born 1989) is a former Russian prison inmate who leaked videos of torture in Russian prisons. The Belarusian spent a total of eight years in prison in Russia and secretly collected more than 1,000 videos of torture and mistreatment of inmates. He shared these videos with the Russian human rights group Gulagu.net.

Gulagu.net stated that the videos not only documented mistreatment, rape, and humiliation of inmates but also demonstrated the systemic nature of abuse within the prison system.

Saveliev applied for asylum in France in 2021, fearing for his safety. Before fleeing Russia, he was stopped at St. Petersburg Airport and questioned by men in civilian clothes who threatened to arrest him for treason and leave him to die in prison if he did not cooperate. Savelyev claims he signed some papers certifying his cooperation with the authorities and was then released. However, he chose to escape and contacted the police after arriving in Paris.
