= Pavel Filatyev =

Russian soldier and author (born 1988)

Pavel Olegovich Filatyev (Note: On rare occasions, his last name Филатьев is transliterated as Filatiev.) (Russian: Павел Олегович Филатьев; born 9 August 1988) is a former soldier (senior sergeant) of the Russian Army's paratroopers during the 2022 Russian invasion of Ukraine.

In August 2022 he published a detailed 141-page memoir on the Russian social media website Vkontakte, which caused a major stir on Russian internet. Filatyev was part of the initial ground invasion in the first two months of the war. He was injured and sent back to Russia for recuperation, during which time (45 days) he wrote his memoir, called "ZOV 56" after the tactical symbol displayed on Russian vehicles during the invasion. The book is available under a copyleft license from several websites.

Having faced prosecution in Russia, he fled the country, passing through several destinations. He was arrested in Tunisia, where the authorities thought he was a spy. After Tunisia, he decided to go to France where he asked for political asylum. On August 30, 2022 Filatyev was granted a right of asylum in France.

== Biography ==
=== Youth and career ===
Pavel Filatyev was born on August 2nd, 1988 in Volgograd Oblast into a military family. He served in the Russian Army in Chechnya in the late 2000s. He then worked as a horse trainer for the meat-producing company Miratorg for almost ten years. In 2021 he reenlisted in the army for financial reasons. According to Andrew Roth, the first journalist to speak to Filatyev, he had been quite loyal to the government and the army, finding it important to carry out commander's orders, but that changed by the confusion and poor conditions in the run-up to the invasion, and deteriorating food and health circumstances and army discipline as the war progressed.

=== Account of the 2022 Russian invasion of Ukraine ===
==== Run-up to invasion and first days ====
Filatyev served as a paratrooper in the 56th Guards Air Assault Regiment, which before the February 2022 invasion was based in Crimea, the Ukrainian peninsula that was unilaterally annexed by the Russian Federation in 2014. In late February 2022, his unit was tasked to storm into mainland Ukraine, under conditions which Filatyev described as being 'exhausted and poorly equipped', and 'with little in terms of concrete logistics or objectives, and no idea why the war was taking place at all.' He stated: 'It took me weeks to understand there was no war on Russian territory at all, and that we had just attacked Ukraine.' A few days earlier, a regiment commander told them to "stop spreading gossip" and that they "would be on their way home in a few days once the exercises end." He said that although rumours began to spread that the soldiers could "storm" Kherson, he initially dismissed such talk as nonsense. Without clear information as to what was going on, Filatyev hypothesised that his unit was either being sent to reinforce Russian-occupied territory in Donbas, or to defend against a Ukrainian or NATO attack on Crimea; he claims it wasn't until his group was tasked to destroy a bridge across the river Dnieper, that he realised Russia was the aggressor.

==== Occupation of Kherson ====
According to Filatyev, the extreme conditions the military command had put the soldiers in his regiment in, including sleep deprivation, malnutrition and poor sanitation, led them to seize food and valuables from Ukrainian civilians as soon as the Russian army occupied the city of Kherson. About their entry into the city on 1 March 2022, Filatyev wrote:

'Like savages, we ate everything there: oats, porridge, jam, honey, coffee. We didn't give a damn about anything, we'd already been pushed to the limit. Most had spent a month in the fields with no hint of comfort, a shower or normal food. What a wild state you can drive people to by not giving any thought to the fact that they need to sleep, eat and wash. Everything around gave us a vile feeling; like wretches we were just trying to survive.'

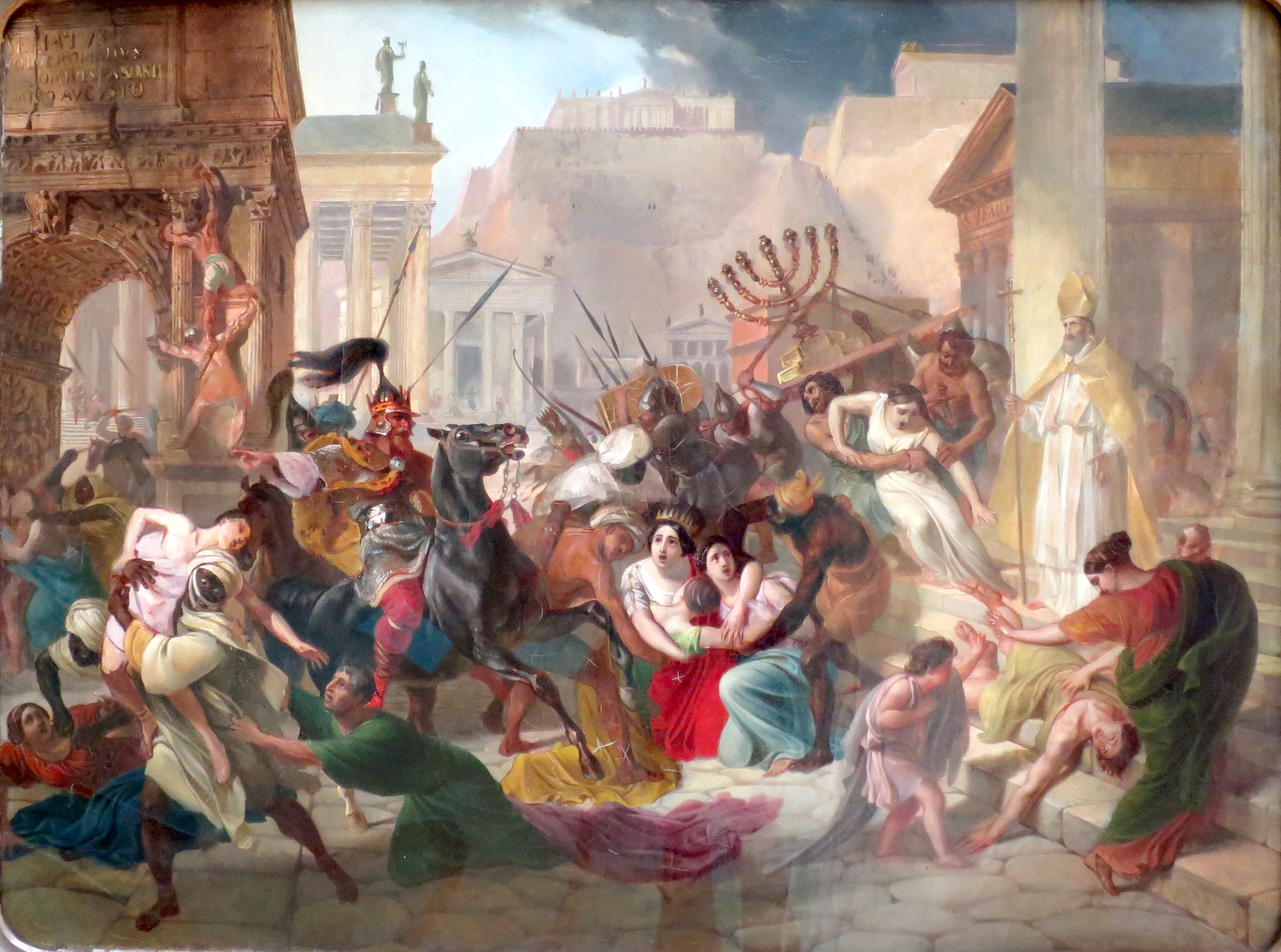
"Sacking of Rome by barbarians" by Karl Bryullov

Filatyev compared the Russian soldiers' looting in Kherson with the painting of the "Sack of Rome by barbarians" by Karl Bryullov. He said he did not seek to justify his fellow soldiers' looting of valuables such as computers, but that he understood that such an item was worth more than a paratrooper's monthly salary, which he was waging his life for every day, criticising this as one of many ways in which the Russian Army "degraded" its servicemen. He admitted to stealing a hat, because "my balaclava was too cold". "Everyone was in a rush, looking for a place to sleep, and people were fighting for a place in the shower queue. I was disgusted by all this yet realised that I was part of it all." In an office building, Filatyev joined several Russian soldiers in drinking cold champagne and watching the news on a television: "The channel was in Ukrainian, I didn't understand half of it. All I understood there was that Russian troops were advancing from all directions, Odesa, Kharkiv, Kyiv were occupied, they began to show footage of broken buildings and injured women and children."

==== Trenches near Mykolaiv ====
After Kherson, the paratrooper unit of Filatyev wandered in the woods in early March, trying to reach Mykolaiv (about 40 miles away). At one point, Filatyev asked a senior officer where to move next, and the commander replied he had no clue what to do. A little after, as their advance stalled in the face of Ukrainian defences, Filatyev's paratrooper unit fortified itself in trenches near Mykolaiv, where it was pinned down for almost a month under Ukrainian artillery fire. Filatyev described harsh conditions, without proper food, sleep, or medical supplies, so that soldiers with various illnesses and wounds went untreated, while the shelling strained their mental health. "Everyone was getting angrier and angrier." He wrote that a prisoner of war was mutilated, and bodies of dead Ukrainians were mocked. Some Russian soldiers deliberately shot themselves in the foot in order to be allowed to return home and receive 3 million roubles (£40,542, US$50,000) in medical compensation. Furthermore, Filatyev wrote that he had witnessed clueless and terrified commanders, old and rusty equipment (the rifle he was given was rusted and malfunctioned after a few shots), friendly fire incidents and wavering morale as the campaign stalled.

In early April, a shell blasted mud into his eye that caused an infection. The eye infection could have blinded him, and after spending five days in pain, he was evacuated back to Crimea for treatment. By that point, Filatyev had become so disillusioned with the war that he vowed to himself: 'God, if I survive, then I'll do everything that I can to stop this.'

==== Hospitalisation and writing of "ZOV 56" ====
Initially, he felt bad about having to leave his comrades behind while recovering in a military hospital, but when he discovered how the war was being portrayed in Russia, including the fact that it was illegal to call it a "war", and almost silence about the abysmal conditions and Russian failures he had experienced on the front, Filatyev became much more critical of military command, and eventually the government, that he had always been loyal to. After some time in hospital, he made clear that he did not want to return to his unit, which was pressuring him to rejoin them at the front, resulting in his desertion from the unit. During recovery, he wrote directly to the Kremlin with his complaints about the war in an attempt to effect a change in policy.

He also spent 45 days to write his 141-page memoir named "ZOV 56" ("ZOV"), and publish it on VKontakte on 1 August 2022, while he was still living in Russia. It was by far the most detailed account of the invasion from the perspective of a Russian soldier so far, and rapidly gained widespread international media attention. He explained his reasons for telling his story: "I survived, unlike many others. My conscience tells me that I must try to stop this madness."

In his book Filatyev gives 3 reasons for the failure of the Russian military in its war with Ukraine:

1. The main reason is that we did not have a moral right to attack another country, especially the nation closest to us: "Thirty years ago we were one country: Russia’s roots are in Kiev, Ukrainians and Russians have many relatives on both sides of the border. And because of this so many people in Ukraine turned into Russia-haters: the betrayal of a relative is more painful than a betrayal of a stranger."
2. The second reason is starting the "special operation" with alienation of Ukrainian populace due to a heavy use of artillery, aircraft, and missiles near populated areas.
3. The third reason is the horrifying corruption and disarray in Russian military along with its moral and technical dilapidation.

The international press also drew attention to Filatiev's book:

- The British The Guardian pointed out in its article: "So far, there has not been a more detailed, voluntary account from a Russian soldier who took part in the invasion of Ukraine".
- The French Le Monde described the book as "141 pages of anger".
- The Swiss Neue Zürcher Zeitung called the book a "terrible story of experience".

Pavel transferred all his profits from the book sales to two non-profit foundations promoting democracy and civil rights in Russia.

=== Life in exile ===
For the next two weeks, Filatyev tried to stay in Russia as he felt 'the country needed him', while moving from hotel to hotel in Moscow to evade police arrest. During this time, he gave an interview to The Guardian's Moscow correspondent Andrew Roth in a cafe in Moscow. Roth recalled: "At the time I met him, almost everyone he knew was telling him to flee Russia." He was getting thousands of letters and messages from people, who either supported him and urged him to flee or who opposed and threatened him, turning his life upside down. After having refused several urgent offers of help in escaping the country by human rights activist Vladimir Osechkin, he eventually agreed and left Russia on 13 August 2022.

On August 28 August 2022, Filatyev arrived to France and requested political asylum there. One of his first acts upon arriving at Charles de Gaulle Airport was delivering an online speech criticizing Russian president Vladimir Putin, and ripping up his Russian passport and flushing it down an airport toilet. By then, he had been 'greeted as a hero by some in the West', but become 'a scourge and a traitor in his native Russia, at least among proponents of the war who know of his existence, as opponents of the invasion are aggressively censored.'

Some critics of his book allege that Filatyev underestimated the levels of support, that president Putin and the invasion still enjoyed amongst Russian soldiers and civilians, while 'some Ukrainians and Russian opponents of the war say he is an unreliable narrator and complicit in the violence.'

Journalists Dan Bilefsky and Ivan Nechepurenko stated: "Mr. Filatiev's account of his time in Ukraine could not be independently verified by The New York Times." Andrew Roth and Pjotr Sauer wrote: "The Guardian has not been able to independently verify all the details of Filatyev's story, but he has supplied documents and photographs showing he was a paratrooper with the 56th airborne regiment stationed in Crimea, that he was hospitalized with an eye injury sustained while "performing special tasks in Ukraine" in April and that he had written directly to the Kremlin with his complaints about the war before going public."

The Los Angeles Times said: "While Filatyev's day-to-day anecdotes and descriptions of particular scenes could not be independently verified, his service record in the 56th Guards Air Assault Regiment — which took part in the capture of Kherson and then was stationed on the battlefront outside the nearby city of Mykolaiv — was confirmed by news organizations including the Russian investigative consortium iStories, now based in Riga, Latvia, which published abridged excerpts." CBC stated: "While it is impossible to verify his claims, his account is very detailed."

The Washington Post said: "The Post has not been able to independently verify his account. But Filatyev provided his military ID as proof that he served in the 56th Guards Air Assault Regiment based in Crimea, as well as documents showing that he was treated for an eye injury after his return from the front."

While Ukrainian podcaster and activist Maksym Eristavi accused Filatyev of "romanticizing" his actions as "a Russian terrorist killing [Ukrainian] families", some military historians regard his memoir as a rather reliable account from inside the Russian military which undermines 'the Kremlin's nonstop glorification of purported military successes in Ukraine'. For example, author and researcher Chris Owen said ZOV "provides an informative insider's perspective on what has gone wrong" during Putin's so-called 'special military operation'.

In a 6 September 2022 interview with CBC News in Paris, Filatyev said: "Russia has been captured by some kind of mafia. The commanders, our government used its army, misleading it."

In March 2023, Filatyev had a conflict with Vladimir Osechkin. The reason for the conflict was an interview Filatyev gave to a Swedish journalist, in which he said that some Ukrainians detained by him and his colleagues were subsequently killed. Since this had not been mentioned before, including in his book, it was perceived as concealing information about involvement in war crimes.
