= Andrey Aleksandrovich Medvedev =

Russian defector from Wagner Group

Andrey Aleksandrovich Medvedev (Russian: Андрей Александрович Медведев; born 16 August 1996), sometimes written as Andrei Medvedev, is a former Wagner Group commander. Medvedev became the first Wagner person to defect, seeking asylum in Norway on 13 January 2023.

== His life ==
Medvedev grew up in Tomsk, Siberia, spending some of that time in an orphanage. According to Medvedev, he spent several years imprisoned for robbery and a year in military service in Donbas in 2014.

Medvedev worked as a commander for Wagner Group, after agreeing to a four-month contract on 6 July 2022, he told CNN. He fought in the 2022 Russian invasion of Ukraine, stating that he "fought in Bakhmut, commanding the first squad of the 4th platoon of the 7th assault detachment" and that he left Wagner later in July.

Medvedev deserted from Wagner Group in November 2022.

== Defection and arrests ==
At about 2 a.m. on 13 January 2023, Medvedev crossed the Norway-Russia border near the Pasvikdalen and was detained by the Norwegian police and soldiers from the Norwegian border guard, thus becoming the first known Wagner Group member to defect. Upon arrival in Norway, Medvedev shared accounts of executions of Wagner deserters and acts that he described as terror-related. Medvedev stated that he feared being murdered with a sledgehammer, in a similar manner to Wagner defector Yevgeny Nuzhin. He reported that he had twice tried to seek asylum in Finland, prior to reaching Norway. Wagner Group released a statement claiming that Medvedev had abused prisoners.

Medvedev's escape was supported by the Russian human-rights organisation Gulagu.net.

Two weeks later, Medvedev was arrested under Norway's Immigration Act and held in detention in Oslo, before being released. Members of the Ukrainian diaspora in Oslo have protested Medvedev's freedom in Norway and called for his prosecution.

In September 2023, Medvedev was arrested by the police at Grense Jakobselv, allegedly for attempting to illegally cross the Norwegian-Russian border. He was released later and said that he "only wanted to visit the Norwegian-Russian border areas in connection with a documentary project."
