= Rostov State Musical Theater =

Theatre in Rostov-on-Don

- Ростовский государственный музыкальный театр
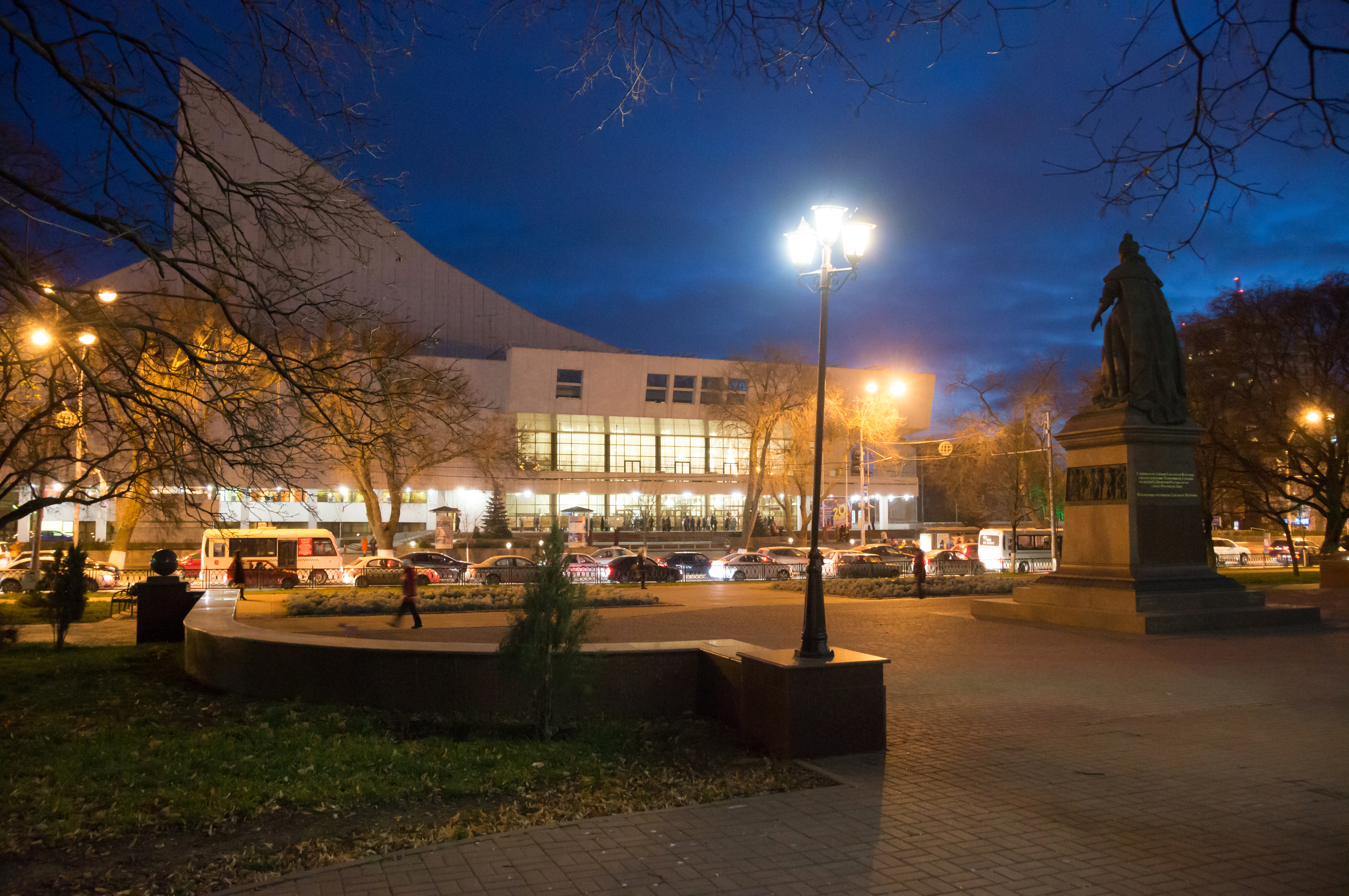
- Interactive map of Rostov State Musical Theater
- Address: Rostov-on-Don; Russia
- Coordinates: 47.2247°N 39.7325°E

Construction
- Opened: 1999

Website
- www.rostovopera.ru

Rostov State Musical Theater (Russian: Ростовский государственный музыкальный театр) is one of the biggest musical theaters in Southern Russia. It is situated in the city of Rostov-on-Don, one of the oldest cultural centers of Southern Russia. The theater opened in September 1999, and is the successor to the 1919 Rostov Musical Comedy Theater.

The theater has two stages as well as a music and entertainment center, and hosts about 300 performances and concerts annually, as well as various forums and festivals. Its repertoire encompasses both musical traditions, as well as experiments in the field of contemporary art.

== About ==
In 1919 the Rostov Musical Comedy Theater was established; this received State status in January 1931. Because it had become run-down, and had no facilities for opera and ballet, local authorities decided to construct a modern replacement.

The site chosen was occupied by gloomy residential buildings one to two storeys high, and by a physiotherapy hospital. It had been designated in the 1960s for demolition in order to build the largest self-service department store in Rostov, but those plans were soon abandoned. Instead, the area was demolished in 1977, and construction of the new theater began. The building had the form of a white grand piano with its lid raised, and was designed by young architects who included L. Lobakov, G. Dukov and V. Hafizov.

In the 1980s, however, the country fell into economic crisis. Construction was suspended and site at the center of the city became neglected. It was not until 1999, after 22 years of construction, that the theater was completed. Members of ballet and opera troupes for the new theater were recruited from the entire country.

Its venues are the 1008 seat Great stage, the 238 seat Chamber stage, and the music and entertainment center "White piano", which allows consideration of the theater as the largest cultural center of the South of Russia.

== Performances and events ==
The theatre hosts about 300 performances and concerts annually, as well as various forums and festivals. Its repertoire includes opera, ballet, operetta, musicals, rock opera, musical short stories and symphony concerts.

=== Famous ballet performances ===
- 2001 ― Giselle. Musical Director ― Andrew Galanov, Staging ― Elena Ivanova, Oleg Korzenkov, art director ― Sergey Barkhin.
- 2013 ― Snow White and the Seven Dwarfs. Music ― Tibor Kocak, choreography ― Gyula Harangozó.

=== Famous opera performances ===
- 2008 ― Carmen. Music ― Georges Bizet. Director ― Yuri Laptev.
- 2010 ― Prince Igor.
