= Alexandra Ageeva =

Russian journalist (born 1986)

- Александра Агеева
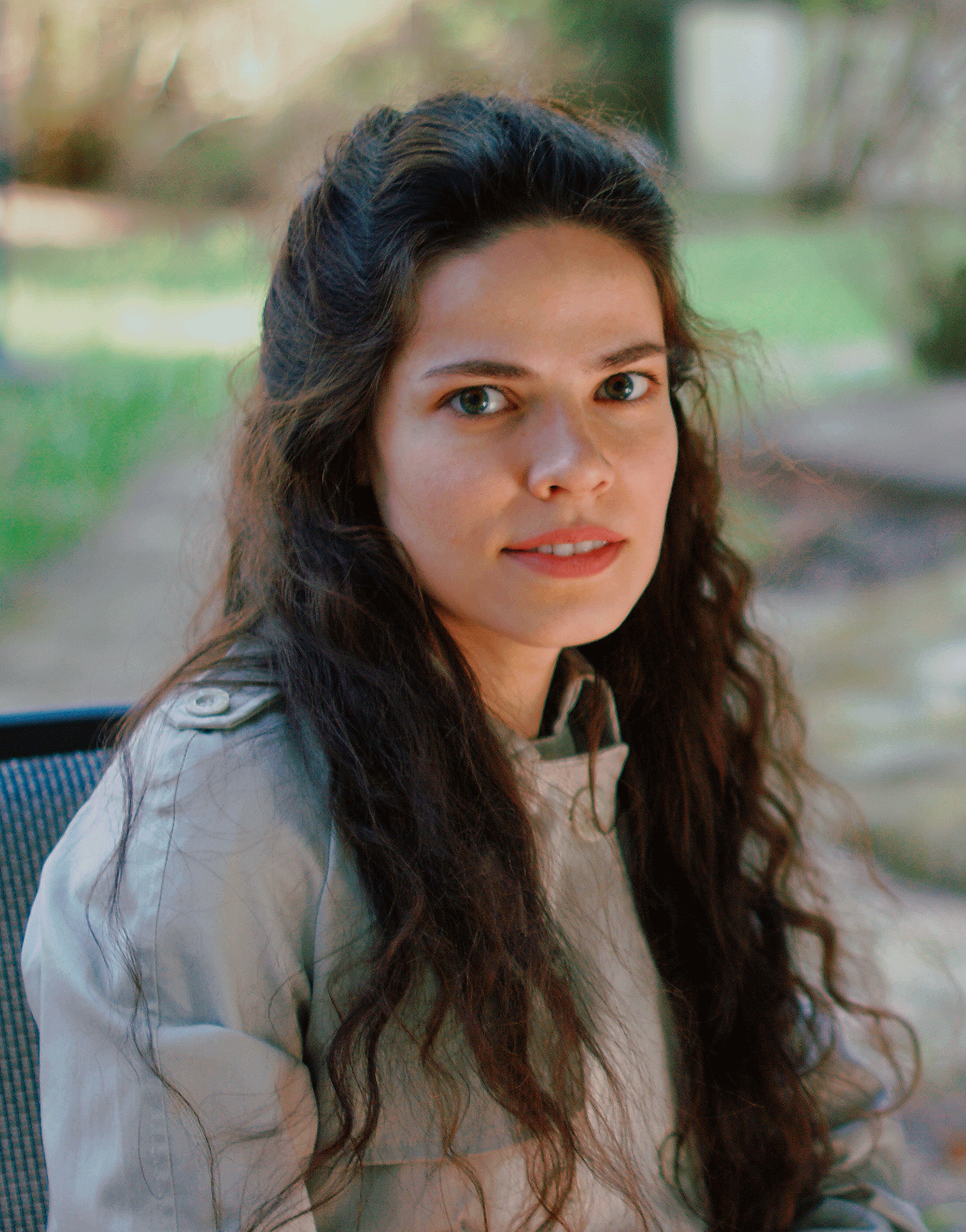
- Ageeva in 2022
- Born: 26 March 1986 (age 40); Sverdlovsk, USSR
- Education: Rostov College of Culture
- Occupation: Journalist
- Employer: Rostov State Musical Theater
- Known for: Sota.vision

Alexandra Ageeva (Russian: Александра Агеева; born March 26, 1986) is a Russian journalist and the founder of Sota.Vision, an independent political media.

In February 2022, she was designated as foreign agent by the Russian authorities.

== Biography ==
Alexandra Ageeva was born on March 26, 1986, in Sverdlovsk. She studied instrumental music at the Rostropovich Voronezh Music High School (Voronezh), graduated from Rostov College of Culture (Rostov-on-Don), and completed qualifications as a teacher and a head of instrumental group. While studying in college, Ageeva joined the Rostov State Musical Theater as a choir artist and performed there after graduating.

== Journalism ==
In 2014, Ageeva became a correspondent for a politics-focused media Grani.ru. She covered the anti-war political actions of Solidarnost United Democratic Movement, worked on a documentary about Euromaidan activists, covered the preparation of the Spring united opposition rally and the election campaigns of Boris Nemtsov and Ilya Yashin in Kostroma. She was, for the first time, detained at the rally in support of Nadiya Savchenko in January 2015.

On December 31, 2015, she registered Sota.Vision (abbr. Sota), her own political news outlet. She also contributed to the production of Vladimir Kara-Murza Jr.'s Nemtsov documentary and was credited. Sota.Vision became known due to its coverage of political events, such as the persecution of Alexey Navalny, and expanded to work with dozens of reporters.

Ageeva covered the trial of Ildar Dadin (the first person imprisoned solely for political activism in Russia) and was occasionally detained near the Constitutional Court in Saint Petersburg. She also reported on 2018–2021 Shies protests and 2020–2021 Khabarovsk Krai protests.

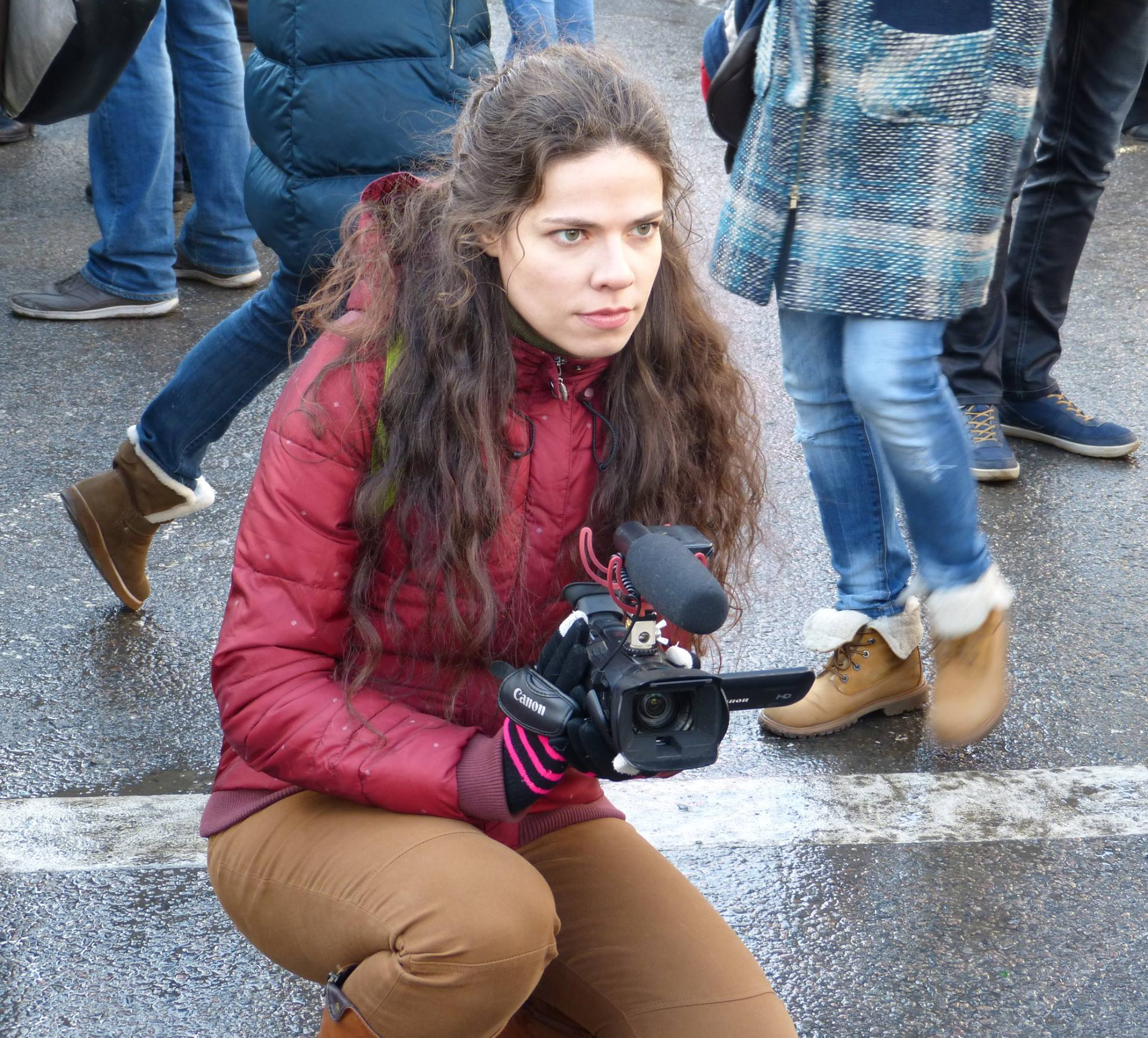
Alexandra Ageeva at the march in memory of Boris Nemtsov in the hospital in 2018

On February 11, 2022, Aleksandra Ageeva, mentioned under her married name Aynbinder, was designated as a foreign agent. In her L'Express interview, Ageeva revealed that the designation was due to YouTube monetization and a 200 Russian Ruble donation from Belarussian activists. In March 2022, following the Russian invasion of Ukraine, she left Russia and ultimately settled in Riga, Latvia.

In January 2023, the Russian state-owned Channel One aired a story accusing Ageeva and Sota.Vision on spreading alleged fake news.
