= Sergei Aslanyan (journalist) =

Russian radio journalist (born 1966)

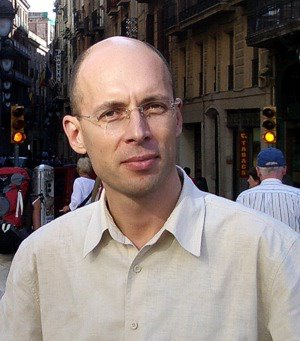
Aslanyan in 2012

Sergei Stepanovich Aslanyan (Russian: Серге́й Степанович Асланян; born 20 February 1966) is a Russian radio journalist specializing in cars.

From 1987 to 1990, he worked as a sociologist at the All-Union Center for the Study of Public Opinion. In 1990 and 1991, he worked as a caricaturist artist in the publishing house Data and from 1992 to 1995, he was editor in the TV program «Авто&Шоу» (Auto & Shows) and between 1994 and 1995, he was the host of «Автомобильное обозрение» ("Automobile Review") on an RTR Business channel. In the late 1990s and early 2000s, he worked in a number of magazines including Autopilot, Kommersant, Moskovskij Komsomolets, Motor, Proyect Garage, Avtomir and MK-Mobil.

Since 1999 he worked at the radio station Ekho Moskvy (Echo of Moscow) where he was the author and host of the radio program "Garage", "Parkovka" (Parking) and "Проезжая часть" ("Roadway"). In 2006, he became editor in chief of Auto, Motor & Sport magazine's Russian edition.

From 2008 to 2012, he worked for Radio Mayak. In May 2012, he was lured from his flat and stabbed twenty times by an assailant. The attack was reported internationally. Despite heavy injuries, Aslanyan survived.

From 2012 to 2014, he hosted the program «Экипаж» ("Crew") on Radio Capital FM (formerly Finam FM) and in partnership with Victor Travin, he launched the site pravorulya.com and in partnership with Alexei Buryak and Alexander Pikulenko founded in 2014 an auto expert online service amsrus.ru. Aslanyan is the editor-in-chief.

After a brief return to Radio Mayak in 2015, he moved to Radio Kometa in 2015 hosted «Авточас с Сергеем Асланяном» (Auto Hour with Sergey Aslanyan) and since April 2016, he is back to Ekho Moskvy in the program "Garage".
