= Sergey Barkhin =

Soviet and Russian stage designer (1938–2020)

- Сергей Михайлович Бархин
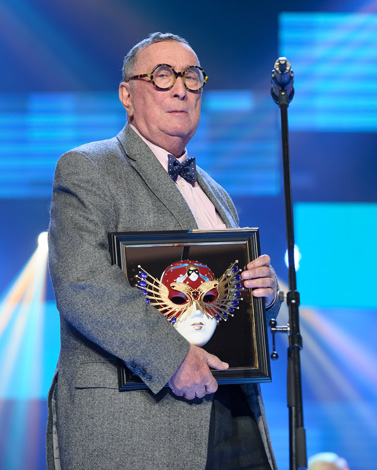
- Sergey Barkhin at the 2013 Golden Mask Awards ceremony.
- Born: Sergey Mikhailovich Barkhin; 31 March 1938; Moscow, Russian SFSR, Soviet Union
- Died: 19 November 2020 (aged 82); Moscow, Russia
- Education: Moscow Architectural Institute
- Known for: Scenography, pastel, graphic arts, book illustration, architecture
- Awards: People's Artist of the Russian Federation (1998); Honored Art Worker of the RSFSR (1991); State Prize of the Russian Federation (1993, 2001); Golden Mask (1995, 2001, 2005, 2011, 2013); Crystal Turandot (1999, 2010, 2011, 2016); Oleg Tabakov Foundation Prize (1997); Stanislavsky Prize (2002); Triumph Award (2004); Seagull Award (2006); Best Art Book, ART Book category (2007); Moscow Prize (2008); ArchiP Architecture Prize (2009); Gold and Silver Medals of the Russian Academy of Arts (1991, 2015); Moskovsky Komsomolets Prize (2016); Theatrical Novel Prize (2018)
- Website: barkhin.ru

Sergey Mikhailovich Barkhin (31 March 1938 – 19 November 2020) was a Soviet and Russian stage designer, painter, book illustrator, architect and writer. He served as chief designer of the Bolshoi Theatre from 1995 to 2000. He was named a People's Artist of the Russian Federation in 1998, received the title of Honored Art Worker of the RSFSR in 1991, and was awarded the State Prize of the Russian Federation in 1993 and 2001. He was a full member of the Russian Academy of Arts.

== Biography ==
Barkhin was born in Moscow on 31 March 1938, into the family of architect Mikhail Barkhin. His mother, Elena Borisovna Novikova (4 June 1912 – 20 July 1996), was an architect and professor at the Moscow Architectural Institute. The family lived in the House of Architects, Moscow on Rostovskaya Embankment. He attended School No. 31.

From 1956 to 1962 he studied at the Moscow Architectural Institute. His diploma project was a museum devoted to Vladimir Lenin in Moscow, which he proposed placing on Red Square.

He worked in architecture and book illustration, as well as at theatres in Moscow, Vilnius, Gorky, Sverdlovsk (during the 1970s, at the Young Spectators Theatre), Saratov, Kuibyshev and elsewhere. From 1988 to 1992 he was chief designer of the Stanislavski and Nemirovich-Danchenko Theatre. From 1995 to 2000 he was artistic director and chief designer of the Bolshoi Theatre.

Barkhin designed more than 200 productions—operas, ballets and plays—in many cities of the former Soviet Union and abroad, including Germany, Finland, Sweden, Japan, Turkey and the Czech Republic. Beginning in the 1980s, he regularly collaborated with theatre directors Genrietta Yanovskaya and Kama Ginkas at the Moscow Young Spectator Theater. Together with David Borovsky, he designed the Vsevolod Meyerhold Apartment Museum (1994). He founded and for many years headed the scenography department of the Russian Institute of Theatre Arts (1992–2007), where he was a professor. He became a full member of the Russian Academy of Arts in 2011. He was a member of the unions of architects (from 1965), artists (from 1974), theatre workers (from 1978) and Moscow writers (from 2013).

His wife was actress Elena Kozelkova (born 1937).

Barkhin died in Moscow on 19 November 2020 at the age of 82. The cause of death was lung cancer. He was buried in his family's plot at Vvedenskoye Cemetery (plot 25).

== Stage designs ==
- 1967 — The Ballad of the Sad Café by Edward Albee. Sovremennik Theatre, Moscow. Co-designed with Mikhail Anikst.
- 1967 — The Narodovoltsy by Alexander Svobodin. Sovremennik Theatre. Co-designed with Mikhail Anikst.
- 1968 — The Art of Comedy by Eduardo De Filippo. Co-designed with Mikhail Anikst.
- 1968 — Tartuffe by Molière. Taganka Theatre.
- 1970 — The Seagull by Anton Chekhov. Sovremennik Theatre.
- 1970 — From Evening to Noon by Viktor Rozov. Sovremennik Theatre.
- 1971 — Roots by Arnold Wesker. Sovremennik Theatre.
- 1974 — Do Not Part with Your Loved Ones by Alexander Volodin. Ivanovo Drama Theatre; directed by K. Baranov.
- 1975 — Romeo and Juliet by William Shakespeare. Graduation production, Boris Shchukin Theatre Institute, Moscow.
- 1976 — Vassa Zheleznova by Maxim Gorky. Theatre of the Soviet Army.
- 1978 — Orpheus Descending by Tennessee Williams. Theatre of the Soviet Army.
- 1977 — The Tsar's Hunt by Leonid Zorin. Mossovet Theatre.
- 1981 — Alone with Everyone by Alexander Gelman. Sovremennik Theatre.
- 1982 — The Rose Tattoo by Tennessee Williams. Gorky Moscow Art Theatre.
- 1983 — Hedda Gabler by Henrik Ibsen. Mossovet Theatre.
- 1984 — Who's Afraid of Virginia Woolf? by Edward Albee. Sovremennik Theatre. Co-designed with Vyacheslav Zaitsev.
- 1984 — The Forest (Mežs) by Alexander Ostrovsky. Latvian State Young Spectators Theatre, Riga.
- 1987 — Heart of a Dog by Mikhail Bulgakov. Moscow Young Spectator Theater.
- 1989 — Goodbye, America!!! by A. Nedzvetsky, based on Samuil Marshak. Moscow Young Spectator Theater.
- 1988 — The Nightingale by Hans Christian Andersen. Moscow Young Spectator Theater.
- 1993 — Ivanov and Others by Anton Chekhov. Moscow Young Spectator Theater — Golden Mask.
- 1993 — Life Is Beautiful, based on Chekhov's short story The Lady with the Dog. Istanbul, Turkey.
- 1993 — The Idiot, adapted by Kama Ginkas from Fyodor Dostoevsky. Swedish Theatre Academy, Helsinki.
- 1995 — Jacques Offenbach, Love and Tra-la-la, based on Jacques Offenbach. Moscow Young Spectator Theater.
- 1997 — The Storm by Alexander Ostrovsky. Moscow Young Spectator Theater.
- 1998 — Tatyana Repina by Anton Chekhov.
- 1999 — The Black Monk, based on Anton Chekhov. Moscow Young Spectator Theater — Golden Mask.
- 2001 — Witness for the Prosecution by Agatha Christie. Moscow Young Spectator Theater.
- 2000 — The Happy Prince by Oscar Wilde. Moscow Young Spectator Theater.
- 2003 — A Taste of Honey by Shelagh Delaney. Moscow Young Spectator Theater.
- 2004 — Rothschild's Fiddle, based on Anton Chekhov. Moscow Young Spectator Theater.
- 2006 — A Ridiculous Little Poem, based on Fyodor Dostoevsky. Moscow Young Spectator Theater.
- 2007 — Roberto Zucco by Bernard-Marie Koltès. Moscow Young Spectator Theater.
- 2007 — Peter Pan, based on J. M. Barrie. Moscow Young Spectator Theater.
- 2009 — Medea, based on texts by Seneca, Jean Anouilh and Joseph Brodsky. Moscow Young Spectator Theater.
- 2010 — The Precipice, based on Ivan Goncharov. Moscow Art Theatre.
- 2010 — Polyphony of the World (directed by Kama Ginkas). Vakhtangov Theatre.
- 2011 — Hedda Gabler by Henrik Ibsen (directed by Kama Ginkas). Alexandrinsky Theatre.
- 2012 — Mr Puntila and His Man Matti by Bertolt Brecht (directed by Mindaugas Karbauskis). Mayakovsky Theatre.
- 2012 — Talents and Admirers by Alexander Ostrovsky (directed by Mindaugas Karbauskis). Mayakovsky Theatre.
- 2012 — Shakespeare's Fools, based on William Shakespeare (directed by Kama Ginkas). Moscow Young Spectator Theater.
- 2013 — Kant by Marius Ivaškevičius (directed by Mindaugas Karbauskis). Mayakovsky Theatre.
- 2013 — Do Not Part with Your Loved Ones by Alexander Volodin (directed by Genrietta Yanovskaya). Moscow Young Spectator Theater.
- 2013 — Lady Macbeth of the Mtsensk District, based on Nikolai Leskov (directed by Kama Ginkas). Moscow Young Spectator Theater.
- 2014 — Masquerade by Mikhail Lermontov (directed by Andrei Zhitinkin). Maly Theatre.
- 2014 — Lear the King, based on William Shakespeare (directed by Mikhail Levitin). Hermitage Theatre.
- 2015 — Russian Novel (directed by Mindaugas Karbauskis). Mayakovsky Theatre.
- 2015 — The Fruits of Enlightenment (directed by Mindaugas Karbauskis). Mayakovsky Theatre.
- 2016 — The Bald Cupid by Yevgeny Popov (directed by Genrietta Yanovskaya). Moscow Young Spectator Theater.
- 2017 — Exile by Marius Ivaškevičius (directed by Mindaugas Karbauskis). Mayakovsky Theatre.
- 2017 — God's Clown, based on Don Quixote by Miguel de Cervantes and Mikhail Bulgakov (directed by Mikhail Levitin). Hermitage Theatre.
- 2018 — Tsars, based on Boris Godunov by Alexander Pushkin and Pugachev by Sergei Yesenin (directed by Mikhail Levitin). Hermitage Theatre.
- 2018 — The Elephant by Alexander Kopkov (directed by Genrietta Yanovskaya). Moscow Young Spectator Theater.
- 2018 — Lady Macbeth of the Mtsensk District, based on Nikolai Leskov (directed by Kama Ginkas). Moscow Young Spectator Theater.
- 2018 — Oblomov, based on the novel by Ivan Goncharov (directed by Mindaugas Karbauskis). Mayakovsky Theatre.
- 2019 — Cat on a Hot Tin Roof by Tennessee Williams (directed by Kama Ginkas). Moscow Young Spectator Theater.
- 2019 — I Am Not at Home, based on Daniil Kharms (directed by Mikhail Levitin). Hermitage Theatre.

=== Opera and ballet ===
- 1981 — Remember! (choreographed by I. A. Chernyshev). Kuibyshev Theatre.
- 1984 — Spartacus (choreographed by I. A. Chernyshev). Kuibyshev Theatre.
- 1989 — Il pirata by Vincenzo Bellini. Stanislavski and Nemirovich-Danchenko Theatre.
- 1990 — Boris Godunov by Modest Mussorgsky (directed by O. T. Ivanova). Stanislavski and Nemirovich-Danchenko Theatre.
- 1990 — Romeo and Juliet by Sergei Prokofiev (choreographed by Vladimir Vasiliev). Stanislavski and Nemirovich-Danchenko Theatre.
- 1991 — Cranes, set to music by Kitarō and Dmitri Shostakovich (choreographed by Dmitry Bryantsev). Stanislavski and Nemirovich-Danchenko Theatre.
- 1994 — Othello by Alexei Machavariani (choreographed by Dmitry Bryantsev). Stanislavski and Nemirovich-Danchenko Theatre.
- 1996 — La traviata by Giuseppe Verdi. Bolshoi Theatre.
- 1997 — Aida by Giuseppe Verdi.
- 1997 — Iolanta by Pyotr Ilyich Tchaikovsky.
- 1997 — Giselle by Adolphe Adam.
- 2010 — Le pauvre matelot by Darius Milhaud (directed by A. Ledukhovsky). Stanislavski and Nemirovich-Danchenko Theatre.
- 2010 — Socrate by Erik Satie (directed by A. Ledukhovsky). Stanislavski and Nemirovich-Danchenko Theatre.
- 2010 — La forza del destino by Giuseppe Verdi. Stanislavski and Nemirovich-Danchenko Theatre.
- 2013 — Die drei Pintos, an opera by Carl Maria von Weber and Gustav Mahler (directed by Mikhail Kislyarov). Boris Pokrovsky Chamber Music Theatre.
- 2014 — Les Chinoises and The Reformed Drunkard by Christoph Willibald Gluck. Conceived by A. Parin and directed by G. Isahakyan and A. Ledukhovsky. Small Stage, Stanislavski and Nemirovich-Danchenko Theatre.
- 2016 — The Queen of Spades by Pyotr Ilyich Tchaikovsky (directed by Alexander Titel). Stanislavski and Nemirovich-Danchenko Theatre.
- 2018 — Macbeth, an opera by Giuseppe Verdi (directed by Kama Ginkas). Stanislavski and Nemirovich-Danchenko Theatre.

== Film and animation ==
- 1973 — Encounters and Partings
- 1977 — Foam (television play)
- 1978 — Vassa Zheleznova (television play)
- 1995 — The Lion with the Grey Beard
- 1997 — The Long Journey
- 2003 — The Dog, the General and the Birds

=== Moscow Young Spectator Theater productions broadcast on Russia-K ===
- 2010 — The Lady with the Dog, based on Anton Chekhov
- 2010 — Rothschild's Fiddle, based on Anton Chekhov
- 2010 — The Black Monk, based on Anton Chekhov

== Books ==
- Lamp Soot. Moscow: Bliznetsy Publishing House and GITIS, 2007. 527 pp. ISBN 5-7196-0263-1.
- Testaments. Pompeian Green. Moscow: Bliznetsy Publishing House, 2011. 240 pp. ISBN 978-5-901838-90-4.
- Red Mercury, Dragon's Blood and Other Plays. Moscow: Bliznetsy Publishing House, 2013. 150 pp. ISBN 978-5-87317-850-8.
- The Theatre of Sergey Barkhin. Moscow: Bliznetsy Publishing House, 2017.
- White on Black: Illustrations for Dramatic Works in the Iskusstvo Publishing House Book Series and Other Publications, 1968–1984. Moscow: Bliznetsy Publishing House, 2017.
- The French. (The Song of Roland, Ballads in Thieves' Cant and A Season in Hell). Moscow: Bliznetsy Publishing House, 2019.
- The Book of the Song of Songs of Solomon: Illustrations and Mise-en-scènes. Moscow: Bliznetsy Publishing House, 2019.
- W. Shakespeare — Hamlet: Mise-en-scènes and Images. Moscow: Bliznetsy Publishing House, 2020.
- W. Shakespeare — King Lear: Mise-en-scènes and Images. Moscow: Bliznetsy Publishing House, 2020.

== Awards and honours ==
- People's Artist of the Russian Federation (1998)
- Honored Art Worker of the RSFSR (1991)
- State Prize of the Russian Federation for literature and the arts (1993 and 2001)
- Golden Mask (1995, 2001, 2005, 2011 and 2013)
- Crystal Turandot (1999, 2010, 2011 and 2016)
- Oleg Tabakov Foundation Prize (1997)
- Stanislavsky International Prize (2002)
- Triumph Award (2004)
- Seagull Award (2006)
- Best Art Book in the ART Book category (2007)
- Moscow Prize (2008)
- ArchiP Architecture Prize (2009)
- Gold and Silver Medals of the Russian Academy of Arts (1991 and 2015)
- Moskovsky Komsomolets Prize (2016)
- Theatrical Novel Prize (2018)
