= Maksym Eristavi =

- Максим Еріставі
- Eristavi at the Frankfurt Book Fair in 2025
- Born: 1986 (age 39–40); Zaporizhzhia, Ukrainian SSR, Soviet Union
- Occupations: Journalist, author, activist
- Known for: Russian Colonialism 101; LGBTQ rights advocacy
- Website: maksymeristavi.com

Maksym Eristavi (born 1986), also known as Maxim Eristavi, is a Ukrainian journalist, author and LGBTQ rights advocate. He is associated with the independent news organisation Hromadske and is known for his work on Ukrainian affairs, Russian imperialism, press freedom and LGBTQ equality.

Eristavi edited Russian Colonialism 101: How to Occupy a Neighbor and Get Away with It, an illustrated book published in 2023 examining Russian colonial expansion and military intervention.

== Early life ==
Eristavi was born in 1986 in Zaporizhzhia, then part of the Ukrainian Soviet Socialist Republic.

He began working in journalism at a young age. In interviews and public writing, Eristavi has discussed the influence of Ukrainian identity, language and post-Soviet politics on his professional interests.

== Career ==
=== Journalism ===
Eristavi worked as a Ukrainian journalist and became associated with Hromadske, an independent Ukrainian news organisation. His reporting and commentary have addressed Ukrainian politics, civil rights, press freedom and Russian influence in Eastern Europe.

He has written about threats to journalists and the challenges facing independent media in Ukraine. His international media appearances have addressed political and social changes in the country, including the experiences of LGBTQ Ukrainians.

=== Russian Colonialism 101 ===
Following the Russian invasion of Ukraine, Eristavi developed a project documenting the history of Russian imperial expansion and intervention. The project led to the publication of Russian Colonialism 101: How to Occupy a Neighbor and Get Away with It by IST Publishing in 2023.

The illustrated volume examines 48 cases involving communities and territories affected by Russian imperial and Soviet policies. It incorporates historical accounts and visual contributions by Ukrainian artists.

In a review for New Eastern Europe, Nicole Yurcaba discussed the book's examination of communities whose experiences have received comparatively limited attention in international discussions of Russian colonialism. The review also examined the role of the book's illustrations in communicating its historical themes.

In April 2026, the German newspaper Die Tageszeitung published a profile of Eristavi and his research into Russian colonialism.

== LGBTQ rights advocacy ==
Eristavi is openly gay and has spoken publicly about discrimination, threats and violence directed at LGBTQ people in Ukraine. His advocacy has addressed the relationship between LGBTQ equality, freedom of expression and democratic rights.

In 2016, he appeared in an episode of Gaycation, a documentary television series presented by Elliot Page and Ian Daniel. The episode examined LGBTQ life and activism in Ukraine. In an interview published by Vice in September 2016, Eristavi discussed the challenges facing openly gay journalists, the organisation of Pride events and public attitudes towards LGBTQ equality.

Eristavi has argued for presenting LGBTQ rights within the wider framework of constitutional equality, freedom of assembly and civil liberties. He has also discussed the importance of international solidarity and the need for advocacy approaches adapted to local social and political conditions.

In May 2022, the LGBTQ publication Queerty published a profile discussing his journalism and advocacy during the Russian invasion of Ukraine.

== Family and personal life ==
Eristavi was raised in a Ukrainian-speaking family in Zaporizhzhia, in southeastern Ukraine. His parents encouraged him to pursue a Russian-language education, believing that proficiency in Russian would provide greater educational and professional opportunities. His father gave him a tape recorder during childhood, encouraging his interest in recording personal stories, an experience that influenced his later career in journalism.

Eristavi has discussed the experiences of his family under Soviet rule. According to his account, his great-grandmother fled from Zaporizhzhia Oblast to Crimea with her children during the Holodomor of the 1930s, after her husband was taken to the Gulag. He has connected his family's experiences of displacement and repression to his understanding of Ukrainian national identity.

Eristavi is openly gay. He has spoken publicly about his experience of coming out and the social isolation and threats faced by openly gay people in Ukraine. In a 2015 interview with Hromadske Radio, he discussed the personal consequences of being openly gay in Eastern Europe. He has also discussed the importance of self-acceptance and openness about sexual orientation in his personal and professional life.

== Selected publications ==
- Eristavi, Maksym (ed.). Russian Colonialism 101: How to Occupy a Neighbor and Get Away with It. IST Publishing, 2023.
