= Sota.Vision =

Russian independent news outlet

Sota.Vision (SOTA)
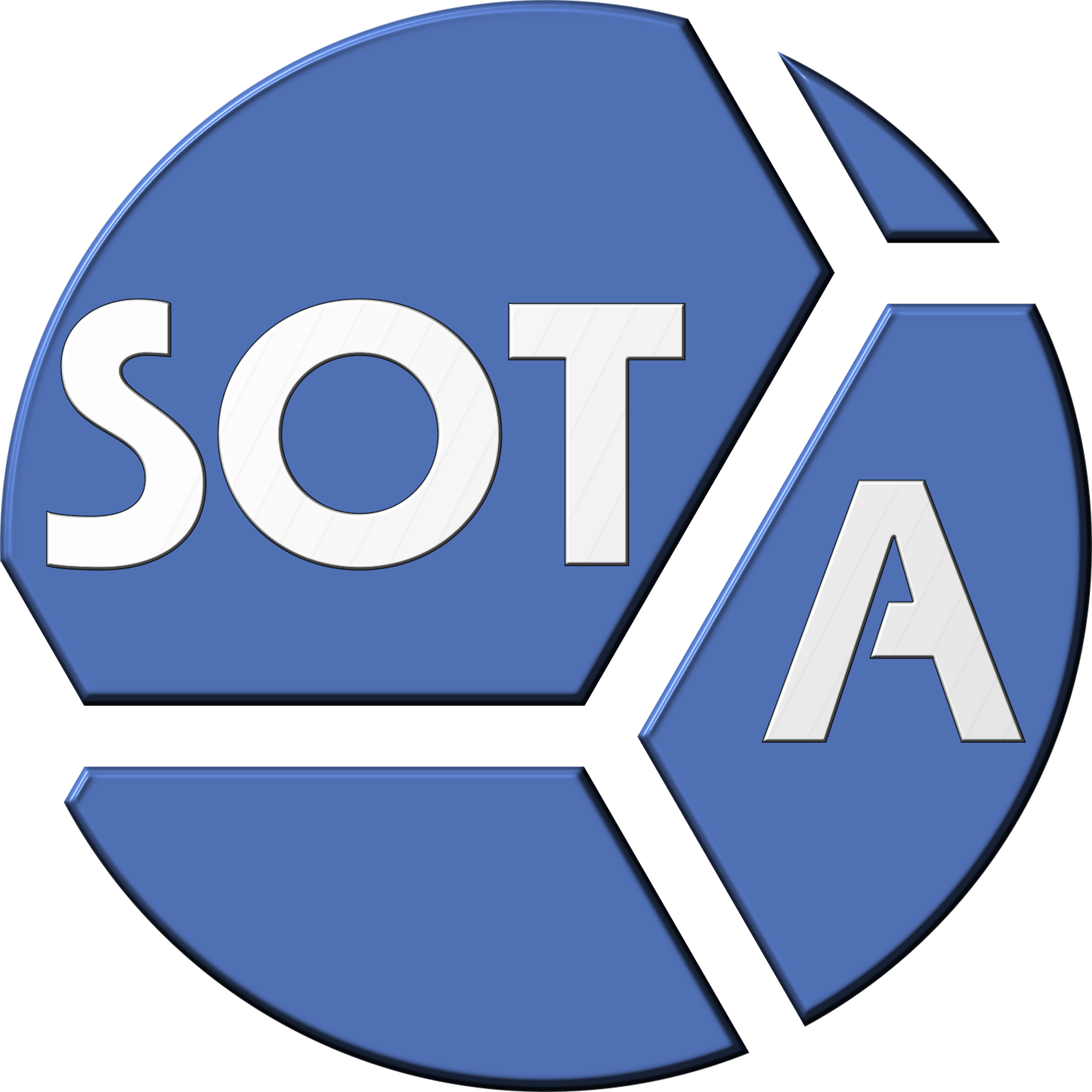
- Website type: News media
- Available in: Russian
- Founded: 2015
- Country of origin: Russia
- Founder: Alexandra Ageeva
- Key people: Alexandra Ageeva, Oleg Elanchik (editor-in-chief)
- Website: https://sotavision.world
- Current status: active

Sota.Vision (SOTA) is a Russian independent news outlet, created by a former Grani.ru reporter Alexandra Ageeva in 2015. It covered Russia's political life, including repressions, opposition rallies and anti-war protests.

== History ==
Sota.Vision website was launched in 2015 by Alexandra Ageeva and Oleg Elanchik, its future editor-in-chief. The same year it registered with Roskomnadzor as an official media and focused on social media. The project had an extensive network of reporters and covered protests and political opposition in Moscow, Saint Petersburg, and other regions. Sota.Vision also cooperated with journalists in Georgia, Latvia, Lithuania, Armenia, Kazakhstan, Poland, Ukraine, and the US to report on topics related to Russia and the anti-war movement.

Sota.Vision was the only media that broadcast the 2023 global rally in support of Alexei Navalny and other political prisoners in Russia that took place in 60 cities around the world. In December 2024, the project was nominated for the annual Reporters Without Borders award as one of the few remaining independent media in Russia.

== Prosecution ==
The prosecution of Sota.Vision included attacks on its editors and reporters. On November 26, 2021, the Russian Ministry of Justice designated Oleg Elanchik as a foreign agent. On February 11, 2022, Alexandra Ageeva was also designated as a foreign agent. In October 2022, Sota.Vision's editor-in-chief, Yevgeny Domozhirov, was declared wanted. The media itself was designated as a foreign agent in June 2023.

In September 2022, Sota.Vision's reporter Artem Kriger was arrested during a live broadcast of anti-mobilization rallies and was subsequently summoned to the draft. In January 2023, Sota.Vision's correspondents, Ilya Makarov and Maksim Litvinchuk, were detained for 15 days while covering a Moscow government meeting. In March 2024, the Russian authorities arrested yet another Sota.Vision reported Antonina Favorskaya.

== Account hijacking ==
By early 2022, Sota.Vision had a team of 40 people (both internal and external staff) and over 300 thousand followers on social media. Because of prosecution and risk of arrest, Alexandra Ageeva had to leave Russia and move to Riga, Latvia. She entrusted part of the login credentials to social media accounts to Alexey Obukhov, back then a Sota.Vision staff member. However, he declined to return control over Sota.Vision's resources.

On May 28, 2022, an administrative account made a statement about the division of the project in Sota.Vision's Telegram channels. The editorial team denied that the project was a mutually agreed breakup and emphasized that it was an illegal seizure. In Summer 2022, Sota.Vision partially regained its resources on Twitter, TikTok, and Facebook, and launched a new Telegram account.
