= Galina Arapova =

Russian media lawyer

- Галина Арапова
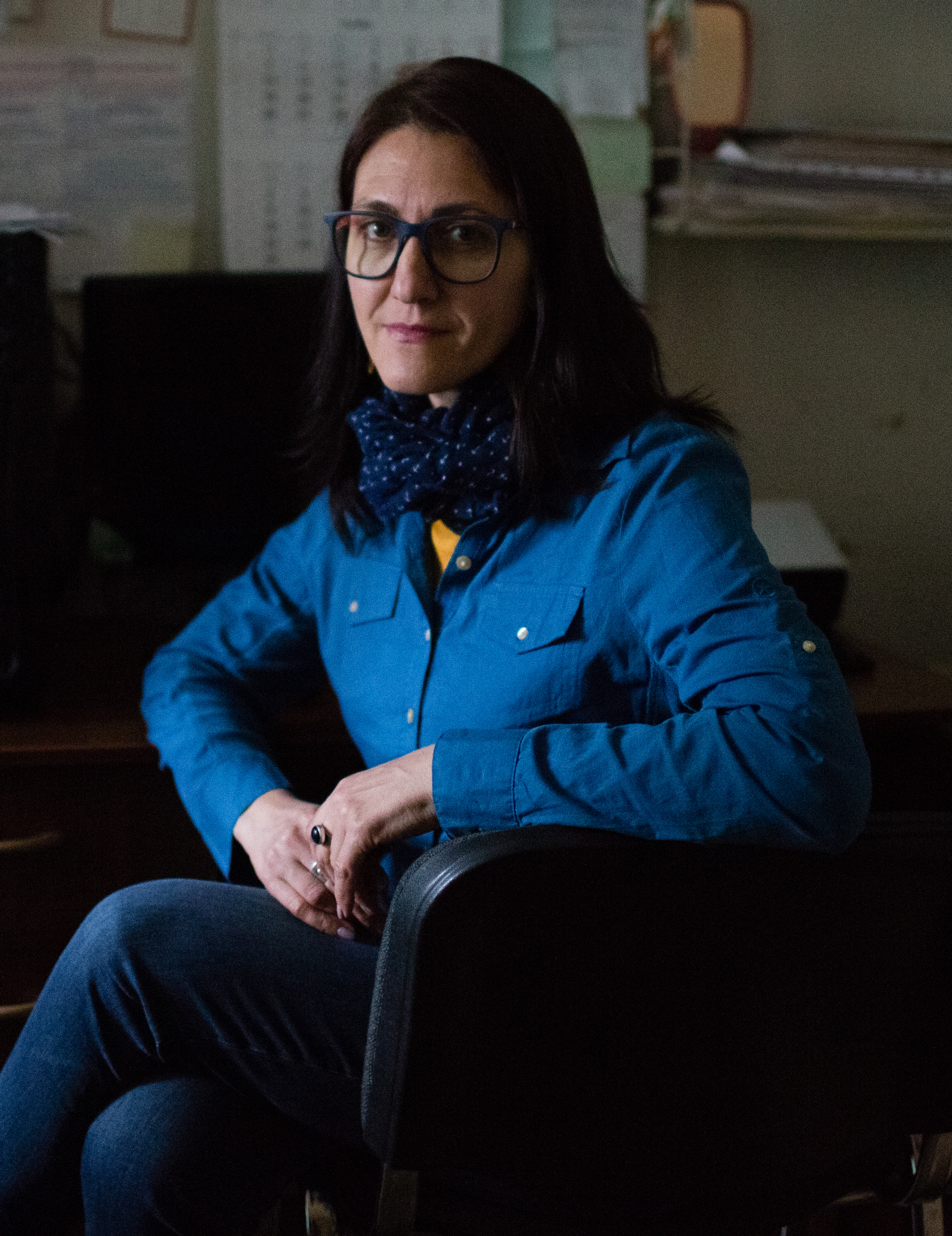
- Born: 16 June 1972 (age 54); Voronezh, Russia
- Citizenship: Russian
- Education: Voronezh State University
- Occupations: Jurist, media lawyer, human rights defender
- Awards: IBA Human Rights Award 2016

Galina Arapova (Russian: Галина Юрьевна Арапова; born 16 June 1972) is a Russian jurist, director and senior media lawyer of the Mass Media Defence Centre in Voronezh. She is an expert on Russian media law.

== Education ==
Galina Arapova studied law at Voronezh State University. She has a law degree and post-graduate degree in world economy and international relations, graduated from Institute of European Law (Birmingham, UK).

== Career ==
In 1995 she went to work at Glasnost Defense Foundation. Since then, she's been working in the field of freedom of expression and freedom of information.

Since 1996 she is the director and senior media lawyer of the non-profit organization Mass Media Defence Centre in Voronezh, one of the oldest Russian specialized NGOs. In 2015 the organization became a "foreign agent".

Galina Arapova is a member of EHRAC's International Steering Committee.

She is a member of the International Media Lawyers Association and of the Voronezh City Public Chamber.

Galina Arapova is a Russian national expert on the admissibility of the Council of Europe’s HELP programme (Human Rights Education for Legal Professionals).

== Awards ==
- Special FOE protection award from Russian Union of Journalists in 2011.
- Anna Politkovskaya prize "Camerton" in 2015.
- Moscow Helsinki Group award for human rights in 2015.
- IBA Human Rights Award in 2016.
