= Vladimir Osechkin =

Russian human rights activist

Vladimir Valeryevich Osechkin
- Владимир Валерьевич Осечкин
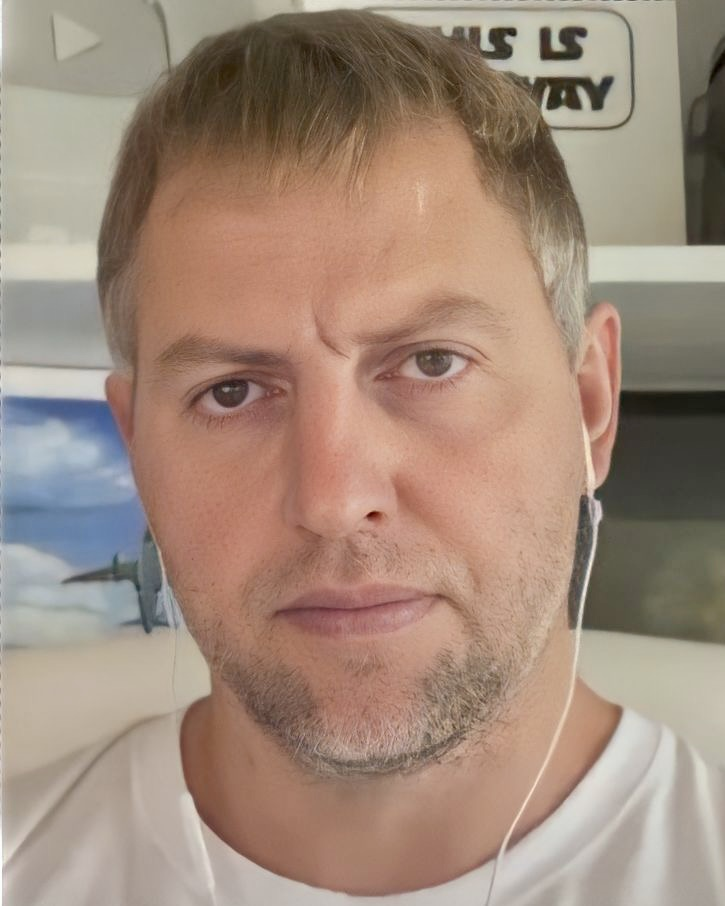
- Born: 14 June 1981 (age 45); Samara, Soviet Union
- Citizenship: Russia
- Education: Samara State University
- Occupation: Civil rights activist
- Known for: his participation in the Russian opposition and human rights movement
- Website: @MrGulagunet

Vladimir Valeryevich Osechkin (Russian: Владимир Валерьевич Осечкин; born 14 June 1981, Samara) is a Russian-born human rights activist who operates the anti-corruption website Gulagu.net from Paris, the city to which he fled in 2015.

== Biography ==
In November 2021 Osechkin was placed on a wanted list by Russian state after leaking a large archive of documents, photos and videos with hundreds of cases of rape and torture of inmates in Russian prisons directed by prison officials. The archive was collected by whistleblower Sergei Saveliev. Osechkin also used a number of other sources in Russian prisons and the FSB. As a result of Osechkin's activities, 18 Saratov regional prison employees have been fired and five criminal cases have been initiated following an internal review.

In August 2022, Osechkin urged former Russian soldier and dissident Pavel Filatyev to flee the country with the help of Gulagu.net, which Filatyev did on 13 August 2022. Later Osechkin has announced that Gulagu.net would be pausing the programme for helping dissident soldiers flee Russia due to Pavel Filatyev "admitting to hiding information about the murders of Ukrainians," as well as refusing to uphold his promise of sending the money Filatyev would receive from writing his war memoir to Ukrainian funds.

In October 2025, French police arrested four men allegedly plotting to assassinate a Russian dissident; Osechkin identified himself as the target of the plot, having been shown video evidence by the police. At the time, France's General Directorate for Internal Security did not comment on the men's nationality, motives, or possible connection to foreign spy services, and French officials did not confirm the plot targeted Osechkin.
