= Gulagu.net =

Russian anti-corruption website

- Available in: Russian, English, French
- Founded: 2011
- Country of origin: Russia
- Founder: Vladimir Osechkin
- Website: gulagu.net
- Commercial: No
- Registration: Optional
- Current status: Active

Gulagu.net (Russian: ГУЛАГу — нет, lit. 'No more GULAG!') is a France-based human rights organisation and website.

It was founded in 2011 by Russian human rights activist Vladimir Osechkin. Gulagu.net has published videos of beatings and torture in Russian prisons and helped Russian defectors flee the country.

== History ==
It was founded in 2011 by Russian human rights activist and expat Vladimir Osechkin, who claimed political asylum in France four years later. The organisation advocates against torture and corruption in Russia. The name of its website translates to "No more gulag".

In October 2021, Gulagu.net published over a thousand videos of torture in prisons throughout Russia. Many of the videos were leaked by prison inmate IT specialist Syarhey Savelyeu who helped operate computers in the prison. Following the leak Savelyeu fled Russia to seek asylum in France. A warrant was issued for his arrest. Russian government spokesman Dmitry Peskov stated that they were going to investigate both the videos for authenticity and the prisons for evidence of human rights violations. Following a criminal investigation, Russian authorities confirmed the allegations and fired several high ranking prison officials.

In 2023, Gulagu.net helped Russian defector Andrey Aleksandrovich Medvedev, a member of the Wagner Group, flee Russia to seek asylum in Norway.

In October 2025, French authorities reportedly detained four men who were suspected of planning to kill Gulagu.net founder Osechkin in Biarritz, the city he had been residing in since 2015.

== See also ==
- Russia Behind Bars
