= List of radio stations in Asia =

This is a list of notable radio stations in Asia for which there are Wikipedia articles.

== Armenia ==
- Public Radio of Armenia - 69.7 FM/107.7 FM Yerevan
- Europa Plus - 87.5 FM Yerevan
- Radio Kiss FM - 88.3 FM Yerevan
- AvtoRadio - 89.7 FM Yerevan
- Radio MIR - 93.7 FM Yerevan
- Radio Aurora - 100.7 FM Yerevan
- Russkoye Radio - 104.9 FM Yerevan
- Armenian News Radio - 106.5 FM Yerevan

== Bahrain ==
- Bahrain News Agency

Foreign stations:

- BSKSA Radio
- Monte Carlo Doualiya - 90.9 FM Manama
- Emarat FM - 92.3 FM Manama
- Rotana - 100.0 FM Manama
- BBC Arabic - 101.0 FM Manama
- MBC FM - 101.9 FM Manama
  - Panorama FM - 91.9 FM Manama
- AFN Bahrain - 106.3 FM Manama

== Bhutan ==
- Radio Waves - 88.8 FM Thimphu
- BBS Radio - 96.0 FM/98.0 FM Thimphu

== Brunei ==
- Radio Television Brunei
- Kristal Media
  - Kristal FM - 90.7 FM Bandar Seri Begawan
  - Al-Quran FM
- Progresif
- BFBS Brunei - 101.7 FM Bandar Seri Begawan

== Cambodia ==
- National Radio of Cambodia
- Bayon Radio
- Virgin Hitz Thailand

Foreign Stations:

- BBC World Service
- Radio Australia
- All India Radio
- Radio France International

== Cocos (Keeling) Islands ==
- ABC Local Radio

== Iraq ==
- Al Aan FM is available in the following cities and frequencies:
  - Mosul & Duhok 92.7 MHz
  - Kirkuk 97.3 MHz
  - Hawija 97.3 MHz
  - Al Iraqiya Radio
- Voice of Iraq

Foreign Stations:

- Radio Free Iraq

== Jordan ==
- Jordan Radio
- Beat FM - 102.5 FM Amman
- Mazaj FM - 95.3 FM Amman
- Mood 92 - 92.0 FM Amman (English Language Radio)

Foreign Stations:

- Radio Sawa Jordan 98.1 FM Amman
- Rotana Radio Jordan - 99.9 FM Amman /100.1 FM Aqaba (Arabic Music)

== Kazakhstan ==
- Kazakhstan Radio and Television Corporation

Foreign Stations:

- Radio Record
- Russkoye Radio

== Kuwait ==
- Radio Kuwait
- Marina FM

== Kyrgyzstan ==
- Kyrgyz Television & Radio Corporation

Foreign Stations:

- AvtoRadio
- Echo of Moscow
- Europa Plus
- Hit FM (Russia)
- Radio Mayak
- RFE/RL Azattyk Radio (Kyrgyz Language Service)
- Radio Record
- Vesti FM

== Laos ==
- China Radio International - 93.0 FM Vientiane
- Lao National Radio - 567 AM & 6135 SW Vientiane
- Radio Australia - 96.0 FM Vientiane
- Radio France International - 100.5 FM Vientiane

== Lebanon ==
- Maestro Fm 90.9
- lbi Radio

== Macau ==
- Radio Macau
  - Rádio Macau in Cantonese FM 100.7 MHz
  - Rádio Macau in Portuguese FM 98.0 MHz
- Radio Vilaverde Lda FM 99.5 MHz

== Maldives ==
- Voice of Maldives - 1449 AM Male

== Mongolia ==
- Mongolia National Broadcaster
- Voice of Mongolia

Foreign Stations:

- China Radio International - 103.7 FM Darhan

== Myanmar ==
- Myanmar Radio and TV (MRTV)

== Nepal ==
- Radio Nepal
- Radio Kantipur - 91.6 FM
- Radio Adhyatma Jyoti - 104.8 MHz
- Radio Lekhnath

== Oman ==
- BBC World Service
- Hi FM (English) (95.9 in Muscat)

== Qatar ==
- Qatar Radio
- Al Kass Radio
- Qatar Foundation Radio

Foreign Stations:

- BBC Arabic
- Deutsche Welle (Arabic Service)
- MBC FM
- Radio France Internationale
- Radio Monte Carlo Doualiya
- Radio Sawa Gulf

== Saudi Arabia ==
- Saudi Broadcasting Corporation
- MDL Beast Radio (English)
- MBC Loud (English)
- AlUla FM (English)
- Energy 1 FM Aramco (English)
- Energy 2 FM Aramco (English)
- Saudia Radio (English)
- Mix FM (Arabic)
- MBC FM (Arabic)
- Panorama FM (Arabic)
- Rotana FM (Arabic)
- Alif FM (Arabic)
- U FM (Arabic)
- Riyadh FM (Arabic)
- Jeddah FM (Arabic)
- Madar FM (Classic Music)
- Makkah Quran FM (Islamic)
- Madinah Sunna FM (Islamic)
- Al Arabiyah FM (News)
- Al Ekhbariyah FM (News)
- Asharq With Blooming FM (News)

== Sri Lanka ==
- Sri Lanka Broadcasting Corporation formerly known as Radio Ceylon

== Taiwan ==
- Broadcasting Corporation of China (BCC)
- Fuxing Broadcasting Station (FHBS Radio)
- Hit FM Taiwan
- ICRT (International Community Radio Taipei)
- Kiss Radio Taiwan
- National Education Radio
- Radio Taipei (Taipei Broadcasting Station)
- Radio Taiwan International
- UFO Radio Network
- Voice of Han Broadcasting Network

== Tajikistan ==
- TeleRadioCom (National Committee on television and broadcasting of the Government of Tajikistan)

== Thailand ==
- HS 1 AS Radio (Bureau of the Royal Household)
- MCOT Radio
- MOE Radio
- Office of the NBTC Radio (but use the name '1 Por Nor Radio')
- Radio Thailand
- Royal Thai Air Force Radio
- Royal Thai Army Radio Network (127 Stations)
  - The 1st Division, King's Guard Radio Station
  - TV5 Radio (only service served in Bangkok)
- Saranrom Radio (Ministry of Foreign Affairs (Thailand))
- Sunshine Radio
- Thai Public Broadcasting Service
- Voice of Navy (Royal Thai Navy)

== Timor-Leste ==
- Radio Timor Leste

Foreign Stations:

- Radio Australia (106.4 FM Dili)
- RDP Internacional (105.3 FM Dili)

== Turkmenistan ==
- Radio Free Europe (Azatlyk Radiosy) - Turkmen Service available on Shortwave and Sateliite Broadcasts.

== United Arab Emirates ==
- Abu Dhabi Media
- ARN - Arabian Radio Network
  - Dubai Eye 103.8
  - Hit 96.7
  - Tag 91.1
  - Virgin Radio Dubai
- Channel 4 FM 104.8

Foreign Stations:

- BBC World Service
- Sawa Gulf

== Uzbekistan ==
- MTRK - National Television and Radio Company of Uzbekistan

== See also ==
- Lists of radio stations in Africa
- Lists of radio stations in the Americas
- Lists of radio stations in Europe
- Lists of radio stations in Oceania
