= List of television and radio stations in Saint Petersburg, Russia =

This is a list of television and radio stations in Saint Petersburg, Russia.

== LW Broadcasting ==
Frequency	Name	Genre	Website	Other
198	planned			

== MW Broadcasting ==
Frequency	Name	Genre	Website	Other Info
684	Radonezh	Religious	radonezh.ru	Owned by the Radonezh organization.
828	Radio Slovo (a/k/a Saint Petersburg Orthodox Radio)	Silent (formerly Religious)	radioslovo.ru	Owned by OOO «Slovo» (Diocese of Saint Petersburg). Migrated to internet broadcasting in 2022.
1053	Radio Maria	Religious	radiomaria.ru	Owned by The World Family of Radio Maria.
1089	Radio Teos	Silent (formerly Religious)	radioteos.ru	Owned by OOO «Teos Media» (Far East Broadcasting Company). Migrated to internet broadcasting in 2016.

== FM ==
Frequency	Name	Genre	Website	Other Info
66.30 *	Radio Rossii	Talk	radiorus.ru	Owned by VGTRK.
69.47 *	TRK Petersburg	Talk	5-tv.ru	Owned by National Media Group
71.24 *	Radio Baltica	Silent (formerly Russian Pop Music / News)	baltika.fm	Owned by the Baltic Media Group. Moved to 104.8 in 2016, however, the frequency was sold to GPM Radio which relaunched it as Like FM in 2021. Migrated to internet broadcasting.
71.66 *	Radio Orpheus	Classic	orpheusradio.ru	Owned by the Russian State TV and Radio Music Centre.
73.10 *	Radio Grad Petrov	Religious	grad-petrov.ru	Owned by the Saint Petersburg and Ladoga Metropolitanate.
87.5	Dorognoe Radio	Russian Pop Music / Traffic	dorognoe.ru	Owned by OOO «Center for New Technologies» (European Media Group).
88.0	Retro FM	Oldies	spb.retrofm.ru/	Owned by AO «Radio Retro» (European Media Group).
88.4	AvtoRadio	Pop Music / Disco	aradiospb.ru	Owned by GPM Radio.
88,9	Yumor FM	Russian Pop Music / Humor	veseloeradiospb.ru	Owned by GPM Radio.
89,3	Vesti FM	Talk	radiovesti.ru	Owned by VGTRK.
89,7	Radio Zenit	Sport / Rock	radiozenit.ru	Owned by AO «Radio Zenit» (GPM Radio 51%, FC Zenit Saint Petersburg 49%).
90.1	Radio Hermitage	Jazz / Blues	rhfm.ru	Owned by ZAO «Radio Company Culture».
90.6	Radio Vanya	Russian Pop Music	radiovanya.ru	Owned by OOO «StarsMedia». Formerly aired on 100.1 FM until December 31, 2019.
91.1	Novoe Radio	Russian Pop Music	newradio.ru	Owned by OOO «New Radio Company» (European Media Group). Formerly occupied by sister station Keks FM, which migrated to internet broadcasting in 2016.
91.5	Radio SPUTNIK	News / Talk	radiosputnik.ru	Owned by Rossiya Segodnya. Formerly owned by GPM Radio, which aired Echo of Moscow until it migrated to internet broadcasting in 2022.
92.0	Radio Komsomolskaya Pravda	News / Talk	radiokp.ru	Owned by AO «Komsomolskaya Pravda Publishing House».
92.4	Hit FM	Dance / Pop Music	hitfm.ru	Owned by ZAO «Radio-Art» (Russian Media Group).
92.9	Radio Vera	Religious / Easy Listening	radiovera.ru	Owned by the Autonomous non-profit organization radio channel "Faith, Hope, Love".
93.3	Radio Gordost	Russian Patriotic Music	радиогордость.рф	Owned by OOO «House of Music» (Presidential Fund for Cultural Initiatives).
93.5	planned			
94.1	Radio Zvezda	News / Talk	radiozvezda.ru	Owned by OOO «TV and Radio Company of the Armed Forces of the Russian Federation (Zvezda)» (Central Television and Radio Studio of the Russian Ministry of Defence)
94.5	Relax FM	relax		Owned by GPM Radio
95.0	NRJ Russia	Dance / Pop Music	energyfm.spb.ru	Owned by GPM Radio
95.5	Studio 21	Hip-Hop / Sport	studio21.ru	Owned by OOO «New Radio Company» (European Media Group).
95.9	Comedy Radio	Russian Pop Music / Humor / Comedy	comedy-radio.ru	Owned by GPM Radio
96.4	Radio Jazz	Jazz / Blues		Owned by OOO «Nashe Radio» (Multimedia Holding).
97.0	Radio Dacha	Russian Pop Music	radiodacha.ru	Owned by OOO «Media Hold» (Krutoy Media Group).
97.6	Radio Orpheus	Classic	orpheusradio.ru	Owned by the Russian State TV and Radio Music Centre
98.1	Like FM	Pop Music		Owned by GPM Radio from 2025
98.6	RoyalRadio	Lounge Music	royalradio.ru/	
99.0	Radio Rossii	Talk	radiorus.ru	Owned by VGTRK.
99.7	planned			
100.1	Radio Popular Classic	Classic		Formerly owned by OOO «StarsMedia» till January 2020 when Radio Vanya moved to 90.6 FM. Currently frequency is active with programme Radio Poplular Classic.
100.5	Europa Plus	Pop Music	europaplus.spb.ru	Owned by AO «Europa Plus» (European Media Group)
100.9	Radio Piter FM	Russian Rock / Pop	100.9fm.ru	Owned by OOO «P178» (OOO «StarsMedia»)
101.4	Eldoradio	Western Hot AC	eldoradio.ru	Owned by ZAO «Radio Katyusha» (European Media Group)
102.0	Rock FM / planned Radio RBC	Rock Music	rockfm.ru	Owned by OOO «Nashe Radio» (Multimedia Holding). Formerly owned by OOO «Radioset ORR», which aired Radio Tvoya Volna util February 2023.
102.4	Radio Metro	Pop Music / Dance / R&B	radiometro.ru	
102.8	Radio MAXIMUM	Rock	maximumspb.ru	Owned by OOO «Maximum Radio» (Russian Media Group)
103.4	DFM	Pop Music / Dance	dfmspb.ru	Owned by OOO «101 & K» (Russian Media Group)
103.7	Detskoye Radio	Children's Music / Learning / Talk	deti.fm	Owned by GPM Radio
104.0	Nashe Radio	Russian Rock	nashe.ru	Owned by OOO «Nashe Radio» (Multimedia Holding)
104.4	Radio Shanson	Shanson	horosheeradio.ru	Owned by AO «Regional Radio Channel» (Krutoy Media Group)
104.8	Like FM / planned new radiochannel			
105.3	Love Radio	Pop Music / Dance	loveradio.ru	Owned by OOO «Radio-Love» (Krutoy Media Group)
105.9	Radio Monte Carlo	Pop Music	spb.montecarlo.ru	Owned by ZAO «Radio Station "Eurasia-Classic"» (Russian Media Group)
106.3	Radio Record	Pop Music / Dance	radiorecord.ru	Owned by ZAO «Radio Record»
107.0	Radio Mayak	Talk	radiomayak.ru	Owned by VGTRK
107.4	Business FM	Talk	businessfm.spb.ru	Owned by OOO «Media-Novosti» (Rumedia)
107.8	Russkoye Radio	Russian pop music	rusradiospb.ru	Owned by AO «Russkoye Radio - Eurasia» (Russian Media Group)

Note: Radio stations indicated with * does not work on non-Japanese receivers.

== TV ==
Channel	Name	Genre	Website	Teletext
1	Channel One Russia	Entertainment	1tv.ru	+
3	Petersburg – Channel 5	Entertainment	5-tv.ru	
6	CTC	Entertainment	ctc-tv.ru	
8	Rossiya 1	Entertainment	rutv.ru	
11	TNT	Entertainment	tnt-online.ru	
22	Subbota			
25	Disney Channel	Animation	disney.ru	
27	TV-3	Movies	tv3.ru	
29	Rossiya K	Culture	tvkultura.ru	
31	78	Local TV	78.ru	
33	NTV	Crime / News	ntv.ru	
36	Domashny	Entertainment / Movies	domashny.ru	
38	You-TV	Entertainment	u-tv.ru	
40	REN TV	Crime / News	ren-tv.com	+
43	Match TV	Sport News	russia2.tv	
46	Che	Comedy	chetv.ru	
49	TV Center	Entertainment	tvc.ru	+
51	Friday!	Entertainment	friday.ru	
