= List of Russian-language radio stations =

This is a list of radio stations in Russian.

== Moscow ==
=== UKV ===
- Radio Radonezh (Radonezh Organization) 72.92 FM - religious radio

=== FM ===
- Business FM (Rumedia) 87.5 FM - All-news radio
- Like FM (Gazprom-Media) 87.9 FM - CHR/Interactive music radio
- Retro FM (EMG) 88.3 FM - Russian and Western 1970-2000s pop and rock hits
- Yumor FM (Gazprom-Media) 88.7 FM - Humor/Jokes/Russian contemporary pop music
- Radio Jazz (Multimedia Holding) 89.1 FM - Contemporary jazz music
- Kalina Krasnaya (EMG) 89.5 FM - Russian bard and shanson
- Radio Record (Radio Record JSC) 89.9 FM - Dance and Club music
- AvtoRadio (Gazprom-Media) 90.3 FM - Adult contemporary
- Relax FM (Gazprom-Media) 90.8 FM - Music for relaxation
- Radio Sputnik (Rossiya Segodnya) 91.2 FM - News/talk
- Radio Kultura (VGTRK) 91.6 FM - Thematical programms
- Moskva FM (Moscow Media) 92.0 FM - News/Talk/Music
- Radio Dacha (Krutoy Media) 92.4 FM - Russian pop hits
- Radio RBC (RBC) 92.8 FM - News/Talk
- Studio 21 (EMG) 93.2 FM - Hip-Hop & R&B music
- Kommersant FM (ID Kommersant) 93.6 FM - News/Talk
- Vostok FM (Krutoy Media) 94.0 FM - CHR and eastern pop music
- Pervoe Sportivnoe (Krutoy Media) 94.4 FM - Sports/Oldies
- Govorit Moskva (Krutoy Media) 94.8 FM - Talk/Oldies
- ROCK FM (Technopark 12) 95.2 FM - Classic rock from last decades
- Radio Zvezda (Ministry of Defence of Russia) 95.6 FM - News/Talk/patriotic literature
- Dorognoye Radio (EMG) 96.0 FM - Russian and Western modern music (with news, traffic and weather updates every hour)
- Taxi FM (Krutoy Media) 96.4 FM
- Detskoye Radio (Gazprom Media) 96.8 FM - Radio for kids (mostly music and educational talk)
- Radio Komsomolskaya Pravda (National Media Group) 97.2 FM - News/Talk
- Vesti FM (VGTRK) 97.6 FM - All-news radio
- Radio Chocolate (Rumedia) 98.0 FM - Covers music
- Novoe radio (EMG) 98.4 FM - Russian CHR
- Radio Romantika (Gazprom-Media) 98.8 FM - Russian and Western pop music
- Radio Orpheus 99.2 FM - Academical music
- Radio Russkiy hit (Krutoy Media) 99.6 FM - Russian CHR
- Silver Rain Radio (Media9) 100.1 FM - News/Talk/Music
- Zhara FM (Crocus Group) 100.5 FM - Pop music, Adult contemporary
- Radio Vera (Russian Orthodox Church Moscow Patriarchate) 100.9 FM - Religious
- DFM (RMG) 101.2 FM - Dance/Pop
- Radio Rossii (VGTRK) 101.5 FM 5:00-1:00 - News/talk radio, Multithematic
- Nashe Radio (Multimedia Holding) 101.8 FM - Russian rock
- Radio Monte Carlo (RMG) 102.1 FM - Adult contemporary
- Comedy Radio (Gazprom Media) 102.5 FM - Comedy Club Radio, pop music
- Radio Shanson (Krutoy Media) 103.0 FM - Russian Shanson
- Radio Mayak (VGTRK) 103.4 FM - Talk radio
- Radio MAXIMUM (RMG) 103.7 FM - Rock music
- NRG (Gazprom-Media) 104.2 FM - International and Russian pop music
- Radio 7: na semi holmah (on seven hills) (EMG) 104.7 FM - Easy and light pop music
- Radio Gordost (Dom Muzyki)/Radio 1 (Podmoskovie Media) 105.0 FM - Russian patriotic music (Radio Gordost); News/Talk (Radio 1)
- Radio Moskvy (Moscow Media) 105.3 FM - Moscow city talk radio
- Russian Radio (RMG) 105.7 FM - Russian pop music
- Europa Plus (EMG) 106.2 FM - CHR/Pop music
- Love Radio (Krutoy Media) 106.6 FM - CHR/Top 40
- Marusia FM (Belgorod Radio Holding) - 107.0 FM - Russian new pop-music
- Hit FM (RMG) 107.4 FM - CHR
- Militseyskaya Volna (Ministry of Internal Affairs of Russia) 107.8 FM - News/Talk/Russian pop

== St. Petersburg ==
=== UKV ===
- Radio Rossii (VGTRK) 66.30 FM 5:00-1:00 - News and talk radio
- Radio Petersburg (National Media Group 72,4%) 69.47 FM 6:00-1:00 - St.Petersburg radio
- Radio Grad Petrov 73.10 FM 8:00-0:00 - Religious

=== FM ===
- Dorognoye Radio (EMG) 87.5 FM - Russian Pop music and news
- Retro FM (EMG) 88.0 FM - Russian and Western 60-90s pop and rock hits
- AvtoRadio (Gazprom-Media) 88.4 FM - Music and talk
- Yumor FM (Gazprom-Media) 88.9 FM - Russian contemporary pop music
- Vesti FM (VGTRK) 89.3 FM - Talk radio
- Radio Zenit (Gazprom-Media (51%) and "Zenit" Football club (49%)) 89.7 FM - Sport news and music
- Radio Hermitage 90.1 FM - Contemporary jazz music and Big Bands
- Radio Vanya (M10 Media) 90.6 FM - Russian Pop
- Novoe radio (EMG) 91.1 FM - Russian pop music
- Radio Sputnik (Rossiya Segodnya) 91.5 FM - News/talk
- Radio Komsomolskaya Pravda (National Media Group) 92.0 FM - News/Talk
- Hit FM (RMG) 92.4 FM - Contemporary Hits
- Radio Vera (Russian Orthodox Church Moscow Patriarchate) 92.9 FM - Religious
- Radio Gordost (Dom Muzyki) 93.3 FM - Patriotic radio
- Radio MIR - 93.7 FM
- Radio Zvezda (Ministry of Defence of Russia) 94.1 FM - Russian pop and rock music
- Relax FM (Gazprom-Media) 94.5 FM - Music for relaxation
- NRG (Gazprom-Media) 95.0 FM
- Studio 21 (EMG) 95.5 FM - Hip-Hop & R&B music
- Comedy Radio (Gazprom Media) 95.9 FM - Comedy Club Radio
- Radio Jazz (Multimedia Holding) 96.4 FM - Contemporary jazz music
- Radio Dacha (SAFMAR Media) 97.0 FM
- Radio Orpheus 97.6 FM - Classical
- Like FM (Gazprom-Media) 98.1 FM - Interactive music radio
- Popular classic (M10 Media) 98.3 FM (Lyuban) - Classic music
- Royal Radio 98.6 FM
- Radio Rossii (VGTRK) 99.0 FM - News/Talk
- Popular classic (M10 Media) 100.1 FM (Simagino) - Classic music
- Europa Plus (EMG) 100.5 FM - Pop music
- Piter FM (M10 Media) 100.9 FM
- Eldoradio (EMG) 101.4 FM - Hits from 60s to 90s
- Radio RBC (RBC) 102.0 FM - News/Talk
- Radio Metro 102.4 FM
- Radio MAXIMUM (RMG) 102.8 FM - Rock music
- DFM (RMG) 103.4 FM - Dance/R'n'B
- Detskoye Radio (Gazprom-Media) 103.7 FM - Child Music
- Nashe Radio (Multimedia Holding) 104.0 FM - Russian rock
- Radio Shanson (SAFMAR Media) 104.4 FM - Russian Shanson
- (planned) Kalina Krasnaya (EMG) 104.8 FM - Russian bard and shanson
- Love Radio (SAFMAR Media) 105.3 FM - Pop music
- Radio Monte Carlo (RMG) 105.9 FM - Pop music
- Radio Record 106.3 FM - Dance and Club music
- Radio Mayak (VGTRK) 107.0 FM 6:00-1:00 - Talk radio
- Business FM (Rumedia) 107.4 FM - Talk radio
- Russian Radio (RMG) 107.8 FM - Russian pop music

== Novosibirsk ==
- Radio Orpheus 88.6 FM - Classical
- Like FM (Gazprom-Media) 89.1 FM - Interactive music radio
- Radio Sputnik (Rossiya Segodnya) 92.4 FM - News/talk
- Radio 7 (EMG) 92.8 FM - Rock and pop hits (classical music hits on the top of each hour)
- Radio Gordost (Dom Muzyki) 93.2 FM - Patriotic radio
- Radio Mayak (VGTRK) 93.8 FM 6:00-1:00 - Talk radio
- Love Radio (SAFMAR Media) 94.2 FM - Top 40
- Radio Vera (Russian Orthodox Church Moscow Patriarchate) 94.6 FM
- Radio MIR - 95.0 FM
- Nashe Radio (Multimedia Holding) - 95.4 FM
- Detskoye Radio (Gazprom Media) 95.8 FM - Radio for kids (mostly music)
- Russian Radio (RMG) 96.2 FM - Russian pop music
- Silver Rain Radio (Media9) 96.6 FM
- Retro FM (EMG) 97.0 FM - Russian and Western 60-90s pop and rock hits
- Comedy Radio (Gazprom Media) 97.4 FM - Comedy Club Radio
- Radio Rossia (VGTRK) 97.8 FM 5:00-1:00 - News/Talk radio
- Radio Komsomolskaya Pravda (National Media Group) 98.3 FM - News/Talk
- AvtoRadio (Gazprom-Media) 98.7 FM - Adult contemporary
- NRG (Gazprom-Media) 99.1 FM - European and Russian pop music
- Yumor FM (Gazprom-Media) 99.5 FM - Russian contemporary pop music
- Novoe radio (EMG) 100.0 FM - Russian pop music
- Radio Uniton - 100.7 FM
- City Wave - 101.4 FM
- Dorognoye Radio (EMG) 102.0 FM - Russian old music
- Radio Monte Carlo (RMG) 102.6 FM - Adult contemporary
- Europa Plus (EMG) 103.2 FM - Pop music
- DFM (RMG) 103.9 FM - Dance/Pop
- Vesti FM (VGTRK) 104.6 FM - News 24x7
- Hit FM (RMG) 105.2 FM - Contemporary Hits
- Business FM (Rumedia) 105.7 FM - Talk radio
- Radio 54 - 106.2 FM
- Radio Dacha (SAFMAR Media) 106.7 FM - Russian and Soviet pop hits
- Relax FM (Gazprom-Media) 107.7 FM - Music for relaxation

== Yekaterinburg ==
=== UKV ===
- Radio Voskreseniye 72.83 FM - Religious

=== FM ===
- Radio Zvezda (Ministry of Defence of Russia) 87.6 FM
- Hit FM (RMG) 88.3 FM - Contemporary Hits
- Silver Rain Radio (Media9) - 88.8 FM
- Detsckoe Radio (Gazprom Media) - 89.2 FM
- NRG (Gazprom-Media) - 89.6 FM
- Radio Orpheus 90.2 FM - Classical
- Novoe radio (EMG) 90.8 FM - Russian pop music
- Radio Sputnik (Rossiya Segodnya) 91.4 FM - News/talk
- Radio Chocolate (Rumedia) 91.9 FM - Covers music
- Radio Komsomolskaya Pravda (National Media Group) 92.3 FM - News/Talk
- Studio 21 (EMG) 92.7 FM - Hip-Hop & R&B music
- Radio Vera (Russian Orthodox Church Moscow Patriarchate) - 93.7 FM
- Dorognoye radio (EMG) - 94.2 FM - Oldies
- Nashe Radio (Multimedia Holding) - 94.8 FM
- Radio Rossia (VGTRK) 95.5 FM - News/Talk radio
- Comedy Radio (Gazprom Media) 95.9 FM - Comedy Club Radio
- Vesti FM (VGTRK) - 96.3 FM
- Radio MIR - 97.9 FM
- Love radio (SAFMAR Media) - 98.5 FM
- Radio Leto (EKOR) - 98.9 FM - Pop music
- Business FM (Rumedia) 99.4 FM - Business news
- Retro FM (EMG) 100.0 FM - Russian and Western 60-90s pop and rock hits
- Radio Pilot (EKOR) - 100.4 FM
- Radio Mayak (VGTRK) 100.8 FM - Talk radio
- Europa Plus (EMG) 101.2 FM - Pop music
- Yumor FM 102.0 FM (Gazprom-Media) - Russian contemporary pop music
- Jam FM (EKOR) 102.5 FM - Hot adult contemporary
- Radio Shanson (SAFMAR Media) 103.2 FM - Russian Shanson
- Radio C (EKOR) 103.7 FM - Adult contemporary
- Radio Dacha (SAFMAR Media) - 104.1 FM
- Rock Arsenal (EKOR) 104.5 FM - Rock music
- Avtoradio (Gazprom-Media) 105.0 FM - Adult contemporary
- Russian Radio (RMG) 105.7 FM - Russian pop music
- Radio Monte Carlo (RMG) 106.2 FM - Adult contemporary
- Sputnik FM (EKOR) 107.0 FM
- Gorod FM 107.6 FM - News/Talk Radio

== Kazan ==
- Silver Rain Radio (Media9) - 88.3 FM
- Dorognoye Radio (EMG) 88.9 FM - Russian old music
- Detskoye Radio (Gazprom Media) 89.3 FM - Radio for kids (mostly music)
- Radio Shanson (SAFMAR Media) - 89.7 FM - Russian Shanson
- Radio Dacha (SAFMAR Media) 90.2 FM - Russian and Soviet pop hits
- Russian Radio (RMG) 90.7 FM - Russian pop music
- Yumor FM (Gazprom-Media) 91.1 FM - Russian contemporary pop music
- Bolgar radiosi - 91.5 FM
- Studio 21 (EMG) 91.9 FM - Hip-Hop & R&B music
- NRG (Gazprom-Media) 92.3 FM - European and Russian pop music
- (planned) Radio Orpheus 92.7 FM - Classical music
- Tartip radiosi (Tatmedia) 93.1 FM
- Business FM (Rumedia) - 93.5 FM - Talk radio
- Radio Mayak (VGTRK) 93.9 FM - Talk radio
- Vesti FM (VGTRK) 94.3 FM - News 24x7
- Radio Vera (Russian Orthodox Church Moscow Patriarchate) - 95.5 FM
- Nashe Radio (Multimedia Holding) 96.8 FM - Russian rock
- Radio Gordost (Dom Muzyki) 97.2 FM - Patriotic radio
- Radio Komsomolskaya Pravda (National Media Group) 98.0 FM - News/Talk
- Kitap radiosi (Tatmedia) 98.6 FM - Literature, Cultural
- Radio Rossia (VGTRK) 99.2 FM - News/Talk radio
- Tatar radiosi - 100.5 FM
- Radio MIR - 100.9 FM
- Novoe radio (EMG) 101.3 FM - Russian pop music
- Radio Record 101.9 FM - Dance music
- Retro FM (EMG) 102.4 FM - Russian and Western 60-90s pop and rock hits
- BIM-Radio - 102.8 FM
- AvtoRadio (Gazprom-Media) 103.3 FM - Adult contemporary
- Comedy Radio (Gazprom Media) 104.0 FM - Comedy Club Radio
- DFM (RMG) 104.7 FM - Dance/Pop
- Relax FM (Gazprom-Media) 105.3 FM - Music for relaxation
- Radio Sputnik (Rossiya Segodnya) 105.8 FM - News/talk
- Radio Monte-Carlo (RMG) 106.3 FM
- Europa Plus (EMG) 106.8 FM - Pop music
- Like FM (Gazprom-Media) 107.3 FM - Interactive music radio
- Love Radio (SAFMAR Media) 107.8 FM - Top 40

== Nizhniy Novgorod ==
- Like FM (Gazprom-Media) 88.4 FM - Interactive music radio
- Radio Orpheus 88.8 FM - Classical
- Radio Vera (Russian Orthodox Church Moscow Patriarchate) 89.2 FM - Religious
- Yumor FM (Gazprom-Media) 89.8 FM - Humor/Jokes/Russian contemporary pop music
- Radio Sputnik (Rossiya Segodnya) 90.8 FM - News/talk
- Kalina Krasnaya (EMG) 91.7 FM - Russian bard and shanson
- Radio Mayak (VGTRK) 92.4 FM - Talk radio
- Radio Komsomolskaya Pravda (National Media Group) 92.8 FM - News/Talk
- Nashe Radio (Multimedia Holding) 93.5 FM - Russian rock
- Radio Rossia (VGTRK) 93.9 FM - News/Talk radio
- Relax FM (Gazprom-Media) 94.7 FM - Music for relaxation
- Marusia FM (Belgorod Radio Holding) 95.6 FM
- Novoe radio (EMG) 96.0 FM - Russian pop-music
- Radio Chocolate (Rumedia) 96.4 FM - Covers music
- NRG (Gazprom-Media) 96.8 FM - European and Russian pop music
- Radio Gordost (Dom Muzyki) 97.6 FM - Patriotic radio
- Radio Obraz 98.0 FM - Religious
- Vesti FM (VGTRK) 98.6 FM - News 24x7
- Detskoye Radio (Gazprom Media) 99.1 FM - Radio for kids (mostly music)
- Comedy Radio (Gazprom Media) 99.5 FM - Comedy Club Radio
- Radio 7 (EMG) 100.0 FM - Rock and pop hits (classical music hits on the top of each hour)
- Silver Rain Radio (Media9)- 100.4 FM
- Radio Record 100.9 FM - Dance music
- Hit FM (RMG) 101.4 FM - Contemporary Hits
- AvtoRadio (Gazprom-Media) 101.9 FM - Adult contemporary
- Radio Monte Carlo (RMG) 102.4 FM - Pop music
- Russian Radio (RMG) 102.9 FM - Russian pop music
- Radio Randevu - 103.4 FM
- Europa Plus (EMG) 103.9 FM - Pop music
- Radio Dacha (SAFMAR Media) 104.5 FM - Russian and Soviet pop hits
- Love Radio (SAFMAR Media) 104.9 FM - Top 40
- Dorognoye Radio (EMG) 105.4 FM - Russian old music
- Radio Rodnykh Dorog 105.9 FM
- Retro FM (EMG) 106.4 FM - Russian and Western 60-90s pop and rock hits
- Radio Shanson (SAFMAR Media) 106.9 FM - Russian Shanson
- Radio RBC (RBC) 107.4 FM - News/Talk
- Business FM (Rumedia) 107.8 FM - Talk radio

== Krasnoyarsk ==
- Comedy Radio (Gazprom-Media) 92.7 FM
- Pi FM (MKR-Media) - 93.1 FM - Russian music remixes
- Novoe radio (EMG) 93.5 FM - Russian pop music
- Vesti FM (VGTRK) 94.0 FM - News 24x7
- Radio Rossia (VGTRK) 94.5 FM - News/Talk
- Like FM (Gazprom-Media) 95.0 FM - Interactive music radio
- Radio Vera (Russian Orthodox Church Moscow Patriarchate) 95.4 FM - Religious
- Radio Sibir (MKR-Media) - 95.8 FM - CHR Music
- Krasnoyarsk FM (EKOR) 96.2 FM
- Radio Zvezda (Ministry of Defence of Russia) 96.6 FM
- Detskoye Radio (Gazprom Media) 97.0 FM - Radio for kids (mostly music)
- Radio MIR - 97.4 FM
- Radio 7 (EMG) 97.8 FM - Rock and pop hits (classical music hits on the top of each hour)
- Yumor FM (Gazprom-Media) 98.2 FM - Russian contemporary pop music
- Retro FM (EMG) 98.7 FM - Russian and Western 60-90s pop and rock hits
- Radio 99.1 FM (EKOR) 99.1 FM
- Radio Gordost (Dom Muzyki) 99.5 FM - Patriotic radio
- Radio Sputnik (Rossiya Segodnya) 99.9 FM - News/talk
- Radio Record 100.3 FM - Dance music
- Dorognoye Radio (EMG) 100.8 FM - Russian old music
- Love Radio (SAFMAR Media) 101.3 FM - Top 40
- Radio Shanson (SAFMAR Media) 101.7 FM - Russian Shanson
- Silver Rain Radio (Media9) 102.2 FM - Various
- Krasnoyarsk Glavniy 102.8 FM - Music/Talk
- NRG (Gazprom-Media) 103.3 FM - European and Russian pop music
- Europa Plus (EMG) 103.8 FM - Pop music
- Business FM (Rumedia) 104.2 FM - Talk radio
- Radio Dacha (SAFMAR Media) 104.6 FM - Russian and Soviet pop hits
- AvtoRadio (Gazprom-Media) 105.2 FM - Adult contemporary
- Russian Radio (RMG) 105.8 FM - Russian pop music
- Radio Mayak (VGTRK) 106.6 FM - Talk radio
- Radio Komsomolskaya Pravda (National Media Group) 107.1 FM - News/Talk
- Radio Orpheus 107.5 FM - Classical music

== Chelyabinsk ==
- Comedy Radio (Gazprom-Media) 87.5 FM - Comedy Club Radio
- (planned) Radio Shanson (SAFMAR Media) 88.0 FM - Russian Shanson
- Radio Vera (Russian Orthodox Church Moscow Patriarchate) 88.4 FM - Religious
- (planned) Radio Orpheus 90.0 FM - Academical music
- Vesti FM (VGTRK) 92.6 FM - News 24x7
- Radio Gordost (Dom Muzyki) 93.0 FM - Patriotic radio
- Radio Mayak (VGTRK) 93.6 FM - Talk radio
- Radio MIR - 94.0 FM
- Love Radio (SAFMAR Media) 94.6 FM - Top 40
- Radio Komsomolskaya Pravda (National Media Group) 95.3 FM - News/Talk
- NRG (Gazprom-Media) 96.0 FM - European and Russian pop music
- Retro FM (EMG) 96.4 FM - Russian and Western 60-90s pop and rock hits
- Detskoye Radio (Gazprom Media) 96.8 FM - Radio for kids (mostly music)
- Radio Rossia (VGTRK) 97.8 FM - News/Talk
- Radio Dacha (SAFMAR Media) 98.7 FM - Russian and Soviet pop hits
- Radio Record 99.1 FM - Dance and Club music
- Radio Sputnik (Rossiya Segodnya) 99.5 FM - News/talk
- Radio 100 - 100.0 FM
- Radio Continental - 100.4 FM
- Business FM (Rumedia) 100.8 FM - Talk radio
- Yumor FM (Gazprom-Media) 101.2 FM - Russian contemporary pop music
- Europa Plus (EMG) 101.6 FM - Pop music
- Novoe radio (EMG) 102.0 FM - Russian pop music
- Dorognoye Radio (EMG) 102.4 FM - Russian old music
- Interwave - 102.9 FM
- Nashe Radio (Multimedia Holding) - 103.5 FM
- Russian Radio (RMG) 104.1 FM - Russian pop music
- Radio Olymp (EKOR) - 104.5 FM
- Marusia FM (Belgorod Radio Holding) - 104.9 FM
- Radio 7 (EMG) 105.4 FM - Rock and pop hits (classical music hits on the top of each hour)
- Relax FM (Gazprom-Media) 105.9 FM - Music for relaxation
- AvtoRadio (Gazprom-Media) 106.3 FM - Adult contemporary
- Pesni ot vsey dushi (VGTRK) 106.8 FM
- DFM (RMG) 107.3 FM - Dance/Pop

== Samara ==
- Radio Gordost (Dom Muzyki) 88.2 FM - Patriotic radio
- Radio MIR - 88.7 FM
- Radio Russkiy hit (SAFMAR Media) 89.2 FM - Contemporary pop
- Novoe Radio (EMG) 89.6 FM - Russian pop music
- Radio Monte-Carlo (RMG) 91.0 FM - Pop music
- Business FM (Rumedia) 91.5 FM - Talk radio
- Radio Mayak (VGTRK) 92.1 FM - Talk radio
- Radio 450 - 92.5 FM
- Nashe Radio (Multimedia Holding) 92.9 FM - Russian rock
- Vesti FM (VGTRK) 93.5 FM - News 24x7
- Radio Rossia (VGTRK) 95.3 FM - News/Talk radio
- Yumor FM (Gazprom-Media) 95.7 FM - Russian contemporary pop music
- Radio Shanson (SAFMAR Media) 96.3 FM - Russian Shanson
- Radio Vera (Russian Orthodox Church Moscow Patriarchate) - 96.8 FM
- Dorognoye Radio (EMG) 97.3 FM - Russian old music
- Love Radio (SAFMAR Media) 97.8 FM - Top 40
- Radio Komsomolskaya Pravda (National Media Group) 98.2 FM - News/Talk
- Retro FM (EMG) 98.6 FM - Russian and Western 60-90s pop and rock hits
- Radio Sputnik (Rossiya Segodnya) 99.1 FM - News/talk
- Europa Plus (EMG) 99.9 FM - Pop music
- Russian Radio (RMG) 100.3 FM - Russian pop music
- Marusia FM (Belgorod Radio Holding) 101.0 FM
- Radio Record 101.5 FM - Dance music
- Radio Dacha (SAFMAR Media) 102.1 FM - Russian and Soviet pop hits
- NRG (Gazprom-Media) 102.5 FM - European and Russian pop music
- DFM (RMG) 102.9 FM - Dance/Pop
- Radio Megapolis (EKOR) - 103.6 FM
- Samara-Maximum (EKOR) - 104.3 FM
- AvtoRadio (Gazprom-Media) 104.8 FM - Adult contemporary
- Comedy Radio (Gazprom Media) 105.4 FM - Comedy Club Radio
- Radio Vanya (M10 Media) 106.1 FM - Russian Pop
- Hit FM (RMG) 106.6 FM - CHR
- Detskoye Radio (Gazprom Media) 107.2 FM - Radio for kids (mostly music)

== Ufa ==
=== UKV ===
- Ashkadar radiosi (Baskortostan State Broadcasting) 66.68 FM

=== FM ===
- Studio 21 (EMG) 87.8 FM - Hip-Hop & R&B music
- NRG (Gazprom-Media) 88.2 FM - European and Russian pop music
- Radio Gordost (Dom Muzyki) 88.7 FM - Patriotic radio
- Radio Iskatel 89.0 FM
- Radio Rossia (VGTRK) 89.5 FM - News/Talk radio
- Detskoye Radio (Gazprom Media) 90.6 FM - Radio for kids (mostly music)
- Radio Sputnik (Rossiya Segodnya) 91.1 FM - News/talk
- DFM (RMG) 91.5 FM - Dance/Pop
- Relax FM (Gazprom-Media) 92.0 FM - Music for relaxation
- Radio 7 (EMG) 92.5 FM - Rock and pop hits (classical music hits on the top of each hour)
- Radio Orpheus 93.8 FM - Classical music
- Radio Komsomolskaya Pravda (National Media Group) 98.3 FM - News/Talk
- Radio Vera (Russian Orthodox Church Moscow Patriarchate) 98.8 FM - Religious
- Radio Mayak (VGTRK) 100.6 FM - Talk radio
- Novoe radio (EMG) 101.2 FM - Russian pop music
- Radio No.1 (Ufa Radio Holding) 101.6 FM
- Vesti FM (VGTRK) 102.1 FM - News 24x7
- Radio Monte Carlo (RMG) 102.5 FM - Adult contemporary
- Roxana radiosi (Ufa Radio Holding) 103.0 FM
- Comedy Radio (Gazprom Media) 103.5 FM - Comedy Club Radio
- Retro FM (EMG) 104.0 FM - Russian and Western 60-90s pop and rock hits
- Russian Radio (RMG) 104.5 FM - Russian pop music
- Love Radio (SAFMAR Media) 105.0 FM - Pop music
- Uldash radiosi (Bashkortostan State Broadcasting) 105.5 FM
- Europa Plus (EMG) 106.0 FM - Pop music
- AvtoRadio (Gazprom-Media) 106.5 FM - Adult contemporary
- Sputnik FM (Bashkortostan State Broadcasting) 107.0 FM
- Business FM (Rumedia) 107.5 FM - Talk radio
- Dorognoye Radio (EMG) 107.9 FM - Russian old music

== Rostov-na-Donu ==
=== UKV ===
- Radio 7 (EMG) - Rock and pop hits (classical music hits on the top of each hour) (5:00-23:00)/Radio Tikhiy Don (23:00-5:00) - 73.76 FM

=== FM ===
- Detskoye Radio (Gazprom Media) 88.2 FM - Radio for kids (mostly music)
- Radio Rossia (VGTRK) 89.0 FM - News/Talk radio
- Radio Shanson (SAFMAR Media) 89.4 FM - Russian Shanson
- Radio Komsomolskaya Pravda (National Media Group) 89.8 FM - News/Talk
- Vesti FM (VGTRK) 90.2 FM - News 24x7
- Radio MIR - 90.6 FM
- Yumor FM (Gazprom-Media) 91.2 FM - Russian contemporary pop music
- Radio Mayak (VGTRK) 91.8 FM - Talk radio
- Nashe Radio (Multimedia Holding) 92.8 FM - Russian rock
- Radio Vera (Russian Orthodox Church Moscow Patriarchate) 95.7 FM - Religious
- Radio Russkiy hit (SAFMAR Media) 96.1 FM - Russian CHR
- Radio Orpheus 97.0 FM - Classical music
- Relax FM (Gazprom-Media) 98.5 FM - Music for relaxation
- Radio Sputnik (Rossiya Segodnya) 99.2 FM - News/talk
- Business FM (Rumedia) 100.1 FM - Talk radio
- FM-na-Donu 100.7 FM
- Retro FM (EMG) 101.2 FM - Russian and Western 60-90s pop and rock hits
- Love Radio (SAFMAR Media) 101.6 FM - Top 40
- Dorognoye Radio (EMG) 102.2 FM - Russian old music
- Russian Radio (RMG) 103.0 FM - Russian pop music
- Radio Dacha (SAFMAR Media) 103.3 FM - Russian and Soviet pop hits
- Radio Monte Carlo (RMG) 103.7 FM - Pop music
- AvtoRadio (Gazprom-Media) 104.1 FM - Adult contemporary
- DFM (RMG) 104.6 FM - Dance/Pop
- Like FM (Gazprom-Media) 105.1 FM - Interactive music radio
- Europa Plus (EMG) 105.7 FM - Pop music
- NRG (Gazprom-Media) 106.6 FM - European and Russian pop music
- Radio Gordost (Dom Muzyki) 107.1 FM - Patriotic radio
- Novoe radio (EMG) 107.5 FM - Russian pop music

== Krasnodar ==
- Radio Zvezda (Ministry of Defence of Russia) 87.5 FM
- Radio Vera (Russian Orthodox Church Moscow Patriarchate) 87.9 FM - Religious
- Radio Dacha (SAFMAR Media) 88.3 FM - Russian and Soviet pop hits
- Detskoye Radio (Gazprom Media) 88.7 FM - Radio for kids (mostly music)
- Novoe radio (EMG) 89.3 FM - Russian pop music
- Radio Gordost (Dom Muzyki) 89.7 FM - Patriotic radio
- Radio Rossia (VGTRK) 90.2 FM - News/Talk radio
- NRG (Gazprom-Media) 90.6 FM - European and Russian pop music
- Radio Komsomolskaya Pravda (National Media Group) 91.0 FM - News/Talk
- Radio Mayak (VGTRK) 91.4 FM - Talk radio
- Comedy Radio (Gazprom Media) 96.9 FM - Comedy Club Radio
- Radio Sputnik (Rossiya Segodnya) 97.8 FM - News/talk
- Radio Shanson (SAFMAR Media) 98.3 FM - Russian Shanson
- (planned) Radio Orpheus 98.7 FM - Academical music
- Radio Kuban (Kuban24 state holding) 99.4 FM
- Radio Krasnodar 99.8 FM - Municipal radio
- Vesti FM (VGTRK) 100.6 FM - News 24x7
- Retro FM (EMG) 101.2 FM - Russian and Western 60-90s pop and rock hits
- Russian Radio (RMG) 101.8 FM - Russian pop music
- Europa Plus (EMG) 102.2 FM - Pop music
- First radio of Kuban (Kuban24 state holding) 102.7 FM
- AvtoRadio (Gazprom-Media) 103.2 FM - Adult contemporary
- Dorognoye Radio (EMG) 103.7 FM - Russian old music
- Hit FM (RMG) 104.2 FM - Contemporary Hits
- Nashe Radio (Multimedia Holding) - 104.7 FM
- Kazak FM (Kuban24 state holding) - 105.2 FM
- DFM (RMG) 106.0 FM - Dance/Pop
- Business FM (Rumedia) 106.8 FM - All-news radio
- Radio Rossia (VGTRK) 107.2 FM - News/Talk radio
- Radio 107 - 107.7 FM CHR/Hits

== Omsk ==
- Radio Rossia (VGTRK) 87.7 FM - News/Talk radio
- Radio Vanya (M10 Media) 88.1 FM - Russian Pop
- Radio Mayak (VGTRK) 88.6 FM - Talk radio
- NRG (Gazprom-Media) 89.1 FM - European and Russian pop music
- Radio 7 (EMG) 89.5 FM - Rock and pop hits (classical music hits on the top of each hour)
- Radio Gordost (Dom Muzyki) 90.1 FM - Patriotic radio
- Radio Vera (Russian Orthodox Church Moscow Patriarchate) 90.5 FM - Religious/Classical
- Radio MIR - 90.9 FM
- Detskoye Radio (Gazprom Media) 91.4 FM - Radio for kids (mostly music)
- Pi FM (MKR-Media) - 91.8 FM - Russian music remixes
- Relax FM (Gazprom-Media) 92.3 FM - Music for relaxation
- Yumor FM (Gazprom-Media) 97.7 FM - Russian contemporary pop music
- Radio Zvezda (Ministry of Defence of Russia) 98.1 FM - Russian pop and rock music
- (planned) Radio Sputnik (Rossiya Segodnya) 98.5 FM - News/talk
- Radio Orpheus 99.7 FM - Classical music
- Nashe Radio (Multimedia Holding) 100.6 FM - Russian rock
- Radio Dacha (SAFMAR Media) 101.0 FM - Russian and Soviet pop hits
- Comedy Radio (Gazprom Media) 101.5 FM - Comedy Club Radio
- Europa Plus (EMG) 101.9 FM - Pop music
- Russian Radio (RMG) 102.5 FM - Russian pop music
- Dorognoye Radio (EMG) 103.0 FM - Russian old music
- Radio-3 - 103.5 FM
- Radio Sibir (MKR-Media) - 103.9 FM - CHR Music
- Radio Record 104.4 FM - Dance music
- Radio MAXIMUM (RMG) 105.0 FM - Rock music
- Retro FM (EMG) 105.7 FM - Russian and Western 60-90s pop and rock hits
- Radio Monte-Carlo (RMG) 106.2 FM - Pop music
- AvtoRadio (Gazprom-Media) 106.8 FM - Adult contemporary
- Novoe radio (EMG) 107.3 FM - Russian pop music
- Vesti FM (VGTRK) 107.8 FM - News 24x7

== Voronezh ==
=== UKV ===
- Radio Blagovestie 73.55 FM - Religious

=== FM ===
- NRG (Gazprom-Media) 87.9 FM - European and Russian pop music
- Marusia FM (Belgorod Radio Holding) 88.3 FM
- Like FM (Gazprom-Media) 88.8 FM - Interactive music radio
- Radio Vera (Russian Orthodox Church Moscow Patriarchate) 89.4 FM - Religious
- Radio Sputnik (Rossiya Segodnya) 89.8 FM - News/talk
- (planned) Radio Orpheus 90.5 FM - Academical music
- Relax FM (Gazprom-Media) 94.9 FM - Music for relaxation
- Radio Rossia (VGTRK) 95.9 FM - News/Talk radio
- Vesti FM (VGTRK) 96.3 FM - News 24x7
- Radio Gordost (Dom Muzyki) 96.8 FM - Patriotic radio
- Radio Komsomolskaya Pravda (National Media Group) 97.7 FM - News/Talk
- Radio Russkiy hit (SAFMAR Media) 98.1 FM - Contemporary pop
- Novoe radio (EMG) 98.5 FM - Russian pop music
- Yumor FM (Gazprom-Media) 99.1 FM - Russian contemporary pop music
- Detskoye Radio (Gazprom Media) 99.5 FM - Radio for kids (mostly music)
- Radio MIR - 99.9 FM
- Europa Plus (EMG) 100.3 FM - Pop music
- Nashe Radio (Multimedia Holding) - 100.7 FM
- Radio RBC (RBC) 101.1 FM - News/Talk
- Radio 7 (EMG) 101.6 FM - Rock and pop hits (classical music hits on the top of each hour)
- Dorognoye Radio (EMG) 102.3 FM - Russian old music
- Radio Shanson (SAFMAR Media) 102.8 FM - Russian Shanson
- AvtoRadio (Gazprom-Media) 103.4 FM - Adult contemporary
- Love Radio (SAFMAR Media) 103.8 FM - Pop music
- DFM (RMG) 104.3 FM - Dance/Pop
- Russian Radio (RMG) 104.8 FM - Russian pop music
- Retro FM (EMG) 105.3 FM - Russian and Western 60-90s pop and rock hits
- Radio Mayak (VGTRK) 105.7 FM - Talk radio
- Radio MAXIMUM (RMG) 106.1 FM - Rock music
- Radio Melodiya 106.8 FM
- Radio Monte Carlo (RMG) 107.2 FM - Adult contemporary
- Radio Dacha (SAFMAR Media) 107.6 FM - Russian and Soviet pop hits

== Perm ==
- Detskoye Radio (Gazprom Media) 87.6 FM - Radio for kids (mostly music)
- Bolid FM 88.0 FM
- Vesti FM (VGTRK) 88.5 FM - News 24x7
- Yumor FM (Gazprom-Media) 88.9 FM - Russian contemporary pop music
- Europa Plus (EMG) 89.4 FM - Pop music
- Comedy Radio (Gazprom-Media) 89.8 FM
- Radio Rossia (VGTRK) 90.2 FM - News/Talk radio
- AvtoRadio (Gazprom-Media) 90.7 FM - Adult contemporary
- Radio Sputnik (Rossiya Segodnya) 91.2 FM - News/talk
- Radio Shanson (SAFMAR Media) 91.8 FM - Russian Shanson
- Radio Zvezda (Ministry of Defence of Russia) 92.7 FM
- Like FM (Gazprom-Media) 93.1 FM - Interactive music radio
- Radio Orpheus 93.5 FM - Classical
- Pi FM (MKR-Media) - 93.9 FM - Russian music remixes
- Radio Vera (Russian Orthodox Church Moscow Patriarchate) 95.0 FM - Religious
- Radio MIR - 95.4 FM
- Novoe radio (EMG) 95.8 FM - Russian pop music
- Radio Mayak (VGTRK) 96.2 FM - Talk radio
- Radio Komsomolskaya Pravda (National Media Group) 96.6 FM - News/Talk
- NRG (Gazprom-Media) 97.6 FM - European and Russian pop music
- Radio Iskatel 98.0 FM
- Radio Dacha (SAFMAR Media) 98.4 FM - Russian and Soviet pop hits
- Silver Rain Radio (Media9) 98.9 FM - Various
- Retro FM (EMG) 99.4 FM - Russian and Western 60-90s pop and rock hits
- Nashe Radio (Multimedia Holding) - 100.0 FM
- Hit FM (RMG) 100.7 FM - Contemporary Hits
- Radio 7 (EMG) 101.1 FM - Rock and pop hits (classical music hits on the top of each hour)
- Radio Nostalgie 101.5 FM
- Dorognoye Radio (EMG) 102.0 FM - Russian old music
- DFM (RMG) 102.7 FM - Dance/Pop
- Radio MAXIMUM (RMG) 103.2 FM - Rock music
- Radio Pilot (EKOR) 103.6 FM
- Radio Alfa (EKOR) 104.1 FM
- Radio Record 104.7 FM - Dance music
- Relax FM (Gazprom-Media) 105.1 FM - Music for relaxation
- Radio Gordost (Dom Muzyki) 105.6 FM - Patriotic radio
- Russian Radio (RMG) 106.2 FM - Russian pop music
- Love Radio (SAFMAR Media) 106.7 FM - Pop music
- Radio Monte Carlo (RMG) 107.2 FM - Pop music

== Volgograd ==
- Radio Orpheus 87.5 FM - Classical
- Radio Monte Carlo (RMG) 87.9 FM - Pop music
- Radio Vera (Russian Orthodox Church Moscow Patriarchate) 92.6 FM - Religious/Classical
- Volgograd 24 (VGTRK) 93.4 FM
- (planned) Pesni ot vsey dushi (VGTRK) 93.4 FM
- Radio MIR - 93.8 FM
- DFM (RMG) 94.5 FM - Dance/Pop
- Radio 7 (EMG) 94.9 FM - Rock and pop hits (classical music hits on the top of each hour)
- Radio Mayak (VGTRK) 95.3 FM - Talk radio
- Detskoye Radio (Gazprom Media) 95.7 FM - Radio for kids (mostly music)
- Love Radio (SAFMAR Media) 96.1 FM - Pop music
- Radio Komsomolskaya Pravda (National Media Group) 96.5 FM - News/Talk
- Nashe Radio (Multimedia Holding) - 97.2 FM
- Radio Dacha (SAFMAR Media) 97.6 FM - Russian and Soviet pop hits
- Radio Rossia (VGTRK) 98.3 FM - News/Talk radio
- NRG (Gazprom-Media) 98.8 FM - European and Russian pop music
- Radio MAXIMUM (RMG) 99.2 FM - Rock music
- Radio Zvezda (Ministry of Defence of Russia) 99.6 FM
- Radio Shanson (SAFMAR Media) 100.0 FM - Russian Shanson
- Europa Plus (EMG) 100.6 FM - Pop music
- Radio Sputnik (Rossiya Segodnya) 101.1 FM - News/talk
- Volgograd FM (EKOR) 101.5 FM
- New Wave (Svezhiy veter) 102.0 FM
- Retro FM (EMG) 102.6 FM - Russian and Western 60-90s pop and rock hits
- AvtoRadio (Gazprom-Media) 103.1 FM - Adult contemporary
- Dorognoye Radio (EMG) 103.6 FM - Russian old music
- Novoe radio (EMG) 104.0 FM - Russian pop music
- Yumor FM (Gazprom-Media) 104.5 FM - Russian contemporary pop music
- Sputnik FM (EKOR) 105.1 FM
- Russian Radio (RMG) 105.6 FM - Russian pop music
- Studio 21 (EMG) 106.0 FM - Hip-Hop & R&B music
- Radio Gordost (Dom Muzyki) 106.4 FM - Patriotic radio
- Vesti FM (VGTRK) 106.8 FM - News 24x7
- Comedy Radio (Gazprom-Media) 107.2 FM
- Silver Rain Radio (Media9) 107.9 FM - Various

== UKV OIRT ==
Name / Call sign	Location	Frequency	Remarks/Operator
Radio Radonezh	Moscow	72.92 FM	Religious radio
Radio Rossii	St. Petersburg	66.30 FM	News and talk (5:00-1:00)
Radio Petersburg	St. Petersburg	69.47 FM	St. Petersburg radio (6:00-1:00)
Radio Grad Petrov	St. Petersburg	73.10 FM	Religious (8:00-0:00)
Radio Voskreseniye	Yekaterinburg	72.83 FM	Religious
Ashkadar radiosi	Ufa	66.68 FM	Baskortostan State Broadcasting
Radio 7	Rostov-on-Don	73.76 FM	EMG
Radio Blagovestie	Voronezh	73.55 FM	Religious

== Outside of Russia ==
=== International (time in UTC) ===
==== AM-radio ====
- Semeinoe Radio Eli 1035 AM in Estonia
  - Radio "Voice of Hope" (3:00-5:00 and 16:00-17:00)
  - Trans World Radio (on weekdays 19:15-20:20. One hour later in winter schedule)
- RBWI 1386 AM in Lithuania
  - NHK World-Japan (15:00-15:30, 17:00-17:50)
  - Radio Poland (16:00-16:30)
  - Radio Strana Regionov (17:50-18:20)
  - Radio Svoboda (18:30-21:30) - RFE/RL Russian service
- Trans World Radio 612 AM in Kyrgyzstan (15:45-16:45)
- Voice of Tajik 1143 AM in Tajikistan (8:00-10:00)
- CGTN Radio 1323 AM Ürümqi (10:00-12:00 and 13:00-15:00), 1521 AM Ürümqi (0:00-2:00 and 11:00-20:00), 1323 AM Shuangyashan, Heilongjiang (11:00-16:00) and 963 AM Huadian, Jilin (11:00-16:00)
- KBS World Radio 1170 AM in South Korea (12:00-13:00)
- FEBC Radio Teos 1566 AM in South Korea (16:30-17:00)
- KICY 850 AM in Alaska, USA (7:00-13:00. One hour later in winter schedule)

==== Shortwave radio ====
- CGTN Radio (8:00-21:00 and 23:00-6:00)
- Radio Taiwan International (11:00-12:00 and 17:00-17:30)
- Voice of Korea (Pyongyang) (7:00-9:00, 14:00-16:00 and 17:00-18:00)
- KBS World Radio (13:00-14:00 and 18:00-19:00)
- NHK World-Japan (4:30-4:50, 5:40-6:00, 9:30-9:50)
- Radio Romania International (4:30-5:00, 13:00-14:00 and 15:00-15:30. One hour later in winter schedule)
- RNE Radio Exterior (22:04-22:30 on Saturdays. One hour later in winter schedule)
- Voice of Vietnam (16:30-17:00)
- TRT Voice of Turkey (13:00-14:00. One hour later in winter schedule)
- Radio Cairo (19:00-20:00)
- Vatican Radio (5:00-5:20, 12:30-12:50, 16:20-16:40)
- WRN Russian (15:00-18:00) (including programs from BBC News Russian, RNE Radio Exterior, Radio Prague Int. and Radio Slovakia Int.)
- WRMI Russian programmes (Every day 7:00-7:30. Monday-Friday 4:00-5:00. Monday 20:00-21:00. Saturday 21:00-22:00. Sunday 3:30-4:30 & 11:30-12:00)
- Echo Helsinki (20:00-21:00 Tuesday, Thursday and Saturday. One hour later in winter schedule)
- Bible Voice Broadcasting (18:00-18:30 on Sundays)
- KNLS (9:00-10:00, 11:00-12:00 and 15:00-18:00. One hour later in winter schedule)
- Madagascar World Voice (18:00-20:00)
- HCJB Deutschland (3:00-4:00 and 22:00-0:00)
- HCJB Voice of Andes/Reach Beyond (15:30-16:00 on Saturdays)

=== United States ===
- Dr. Koles' weekly talk show 1430 AM - Physical and psychological health. Chicago, United States.
- Echo Planety 1240 AM - Chat, news/talk, music. Chicago, United States.
- Narodnaya Volna Radio 1430 AM - Chat, news/talk, music. Chicago, United States.
- New Life Russian Radio 1330 AM - Pop music, news/talk, first Russian station in the United States, Chicago.
- Vashe Radio 1240 AM - Chat, news/talk, music. Chicago, United States.
- i-netradio.com 24hrs/7 - Chat, news/talk, music. Florida, United States.
- Freedom FM 104.7 - News, music, talk, and shows; Michael Novakhov, co-founder and host, New York City, United States.
- WSNR 620 AM - New York City, United States.
- KXPD 1040 AM - News/talk, music. Portland, Oregon, United States.
- KGDD 1520 AM - Christian, news/talk. Portland, Oregon, United States.

=== UAE ===
- Europa Plus - Dubai 96.3 FM
- Volna Radio - Dubai 103.2 FM

=== Mongolia ===
- Russkoe Radio Mongolia - Pop music (mostliy russian-language) - Ulaanbaatar 90.5 FM

=== Australia ===
- SBS Radio 2 (DAB+ and FM) - National multilingual broadcaster, with regular Russian language programs.

=== Canada ===
- CKER-FM Edmonton, Alberta, Canada; 107.1 -Sundays 21:00, music, news for Russians in Canada
- Voice of Alberta 106.7 FM - Chat, news/talk, music. Russian speaking community in Calgary, Alberta, Canada.

=== Spain ===
- Europa Plus - DAB+ on Barcelona, Tarragona and Reus
- Radio Tenerife - Santa Cruz de Tenerife (Arona 104.4 FM, Adeje 105.0 FM, Gúimar 105.9 FM)
- Radio Matryoshka - Benidorm 99.9 FM
- RusRadio Marbella - Marbella 106.2 FM

=== United Kingdom ===
- Radio Matryoshka - DAB+ in London, Manchester, Liverpool, Edinburgh and Newry (NI)

=== Germany ===
- Radio Golos Berlina - Berlin 97.2 FM

=== Poland ===
- Radio Poland DAB+ - half-hour programmes from Russian service at 8:00, 13:00, 15:00, 17:00 and 19:30 local time

=== Estonia ===
- Raadio 4 (MUX R1 DAB+ and FM) - Chat, news/talk, music.
- Radio Echo (MUX R1 DAB+) - de facto successor of Radio "Echo of Moscow"
- Radio Maximum (Tallinn 100.0 FM, Rakvere 99.6 FM, Kohtla-Jarve 96.3 FM, Narva 100.0 FM and Tartu 94.1 FM) - Music/talk.
- Sky Radio (Tallinn 98.4 FM, Rakvere 93.8 FM, Kohtla-Järve 102.1 FM, Narva 107.9 FM and Tartu 107.2 FM) - Music.
- Super Radio (Tallinn 90.6 FM, Rakvere 99.2 FM, Kohtla-Järve 89.5 FM, Narva 103.6 FM and Tartu 101.2 FM) - Chat, news/talk, music.
- Star FM+ (before 30 November 2026) (Tallinn 107.1 FM, Kohtla-Jarve 106.9 FM and Narva 89.0 FM) - CHR/Pop music.
- Semeinoe Radio Eli (Narva 95.6 FM, Kohtla-Jarve 98.2 FM and Tartu 1035 AM) - Religious

=== Latvia ===
- Top Radio - Dance music/Russian hits
- SWH Plus - Russian language music hits
- EHR Plus - Russian language new music (Riga 96.2 FM, Jelgava 95.5 FM and Liepaja 87.7 FM)
- Retro FM Latvia - Retro music (Riga 94.5 FM, Liepaja 92.3 FM, Rezekne 105.5 FM and Daugavpils 99.4 FM)
- Radio Skonto Plus - Russian language music station (Riga 102.3 FM)
- Avtoradio - Music hits (Riga 103.2 and Kraslava 96.1 FM)
- Radio Melodija - Adult contemporary (Riga 93.9 FM and Ventspils 88.5 FM)
- Radio Roks - Russian rock (Riga 88.6 FM)
- Radio Rezekne - Music and news (Rezekne 105.1 FM)
- Alise Plus - Music and news (Daugavpils 101.6 FM)

=== Lithuania ===
- LRT Radijas - half-hour russian language news bulletin (weekdays at 16:05-16:30)
- Radio R - Russian pop music

=== Cyprus ===
- Russkoe Radio Cyprus - Pop music
- Radio Monte Carlo Cyprus - Pop music (Limassol 104.5 FM)

=== Israel ===
- Kan Reka - Mostly Russian-language all-thematic station.
- Muzyka 106.4 FM Luchshee radio - Netanya 106.4 FM
- Pervoe radio - Ashdod 89.1 FM
