= Denis Serikov =

Russian radio producer

- Денис Сериков
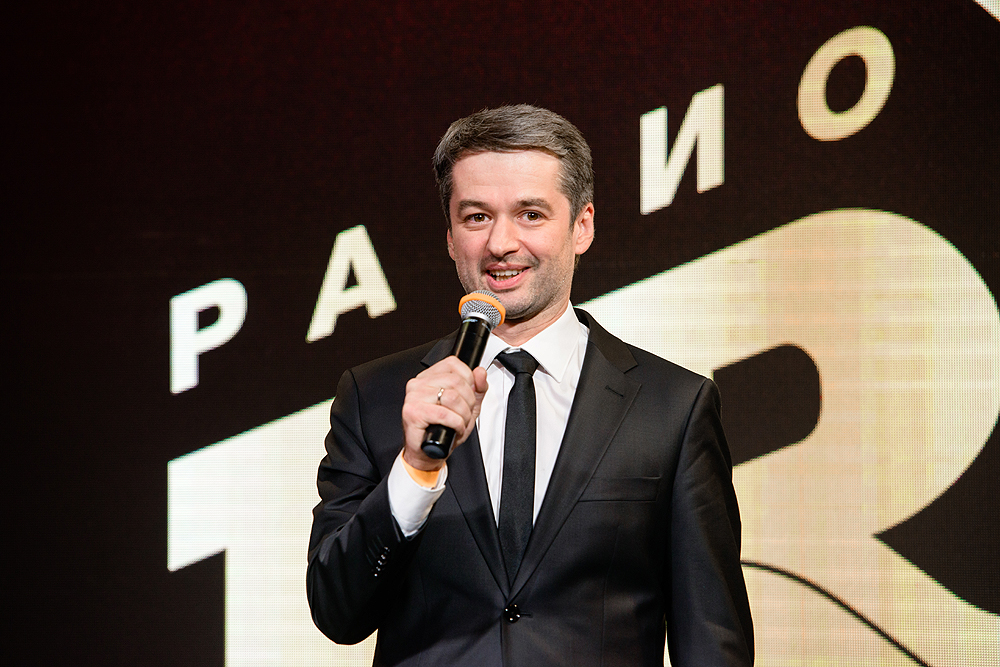

Denis Gennadievich Serikov is a Russian media manager responsible for co-creating several popular radio stations in Russia, including the Russian version of the international radio brand NRJ. He was the General Producer of the major media conglomerate Gazprom Media Radio and the head of the former's popular Moscow-based radio station called Like FM.

In September 2024, Serikov left both Like FM and Gazprom Media Radio for the Russian Media Group to be the latter company's Deputy General Director for Content Policy and Promotion.

== Early years ==
Serikov was born in the city of Oktyabrsky in the Bashkir ASSR in 1973 to a family of Soviet engineers. His cousin's grandfather is Ivan Serikov, a Hero of the Soviet Union. In 1979, he moved to Moscow with his parents. He graduated from the Mechanical-Technological Faculty of MSTU MAMI in 1996.

During his studies, he played in various music bands and participated in festivals. One of the bands he was a part of was Murzilki Motor Cycles where Serikov acted as guitarist from 1992 to 1996.

After graduating, Serikov continued his musical career from 1996 to 1998 as a guitarist for the rock band Mongol Shuudan. He recorded two albums with the group: "Alive" (1997) and "Apricots" (1999). He also participated in other musical projects as a musician, arranger, and producer. After two years of performing, he decided that he would not "achieve great development" as musician. However, Denis Serikov was a "fervent music lover" and wanted to find work related to music. As a music lover, he amassed a personal collection of more than 1,500 cassette tapes, followed by several thousand CDs. He still writes and plays music as a hobby.

== Career ==
=== Open Radio and First Popular Radio ===
In 1998, Serikov started working at the Open Radio station, initially as an assistant music editor, later becoming the music editor and then the program director.

While Open Radio was devoted to rock music format, a number of music Serikov's programs gained fame, including "Big Ben Rock" with Sergey Ozon, "Smoke Under Water" with Kirill Nemolyaev and Alexander Semashko, "Back to the Universe" with Martin Landers, "Bluesology" with Alexey Kalachev and others. Serikov completely rebranded and reformatted the radio station, orienting it towards the foreign classification of AC oriented Rock, which led to Open Radio becoming profitable in less than two years. In 2003, the frequency owners of Open Radio decided to focus on Russian popular music, resulting in the project First Popular Radio (Popsa) (Gazprom-Media), which was also entrusted to Serikov's leadership. According to the indicators in its second year of broadcasting, Popsa entered the top 15 most popular radio stations in Moscow.

=== Radio Energy, Next FM and Romantika Radio ===
In 2006, Serikov was invited to serve as the general producer of the Energia radio station (broadcasting corporation Prof-Media). He then introduced the first international radio brand NRJ (France) to the Russian market. A few years later, Energia became one of the most popular stations among the youth audience and entered the top 10 radio stations in Russia. This experience of international collaboration in the field of broadcasting later became a subject of study at RANEPA.

Serikov participated in the creation of the Next FM radio station, later known as Radio Next. In 2010, as the editor-in-chief, he launched a new radio station, Romantika (Prof-Media), which became one of the leading stations among the female audience in Moscow.

In 2014, after the merger of the Prof-Media and Gazprom-Media holdings, Denis Serikov became the general producer of two more radio stations, Comedy Radio and Relax FM. In the combined company Gazprom-Media Radio (GPM Radio), he was appointed Producer General.

In 2020, the track "Roses" by Kazakh DJ Imanbek Zeikenov (Imanbek) began to be aired at Energia radio. The station's editors independently selected the track for broadcast from releases on the Internet. The track later gained global popularity and won a Grammy Award.

=== Like FM ===
The radio station Like FM was created by Denis Serikov in 2015. The station was the first in the world to base its music broadcasting on listener votes, selecting songs for rotation. According to Serikov, "another novelty of Like FM is that this radio station was the first to broadcast songs not in their entirety. This reflects the current reality: we all scroll through social media tapes very quickly, there is no time to listen to the song for a long time". All songs are broadcast for about two minutes, allowing almost two broadcast hours to fit into a regular hour.

A year after launch, the radio station entered the "top-10" ranking among the youth audience and the "top-25" among the Moscow audience.

Together with Apple Music, the radio station created a "trend-chart": "a hit parade of songs that promise to become hits". Apple Music helps understand which songs generate the most interest from the audience, Like FM invites performers, so people listen to "a selection of future hits, about which no one knows yet". Under Serikov's leadership, the radio station also hosts LikeParty—"interactive concerts", the repertoire of which can be influenced by spectators in the hall via a mobile app.

=== Russian Media Group ===
On September 11, 2024, the Russian Media Group (RMG) - the owner of Russkoye Radio, Radio Maximum, the Russian version of Radio Monte Carlo, Hit FM, DFM and RU.TV - announced the appointment of Serikov as Deputy General Director for Content Policy and Promotion. He was tasked to lead the direction of strategic development and content policy of the holding's media assets as well as the promotion and positioning of these brands.

=== Authored radio shows ===
Denis Serikov is the author and producer of many show projects on radio: "Show with Black Pepper", "Truth Detector" (talk show featuring a lie detector), "NRJ Vision", "NRJ in the Mountain", "LikeParty", "Black2White", "Revolver", "Pick-Up Rules", "Macho in an Hour", "Work in a Big City", "Blonde Battle" and others. Many of the projects were created in a format invented by Serikov, which he coined "radio-reality-show". The projects actively use video content distributed via the Internet. In 2020, Serikov introduced the digital voice assistant Alisa as a radio host on Like FM for several months.

== Recognition ==
Serikov is an acting academician of the Russian Academy of Radio (RAR). Based on the results of 2012, he was included in the "rating of the best young media managers in Russia" according to PwC and Odgers Berndtson. In 2016, he was awarded the national award in the field of media business Media Manager of Russia — 2016. Among more than 100 applicants, Denis Serikov was noted for launching the Like FM radio station. Like FM itself is a multi-winner of the annual national award in the field of broadcasting Radio Mania: in 2016, the radio station received a special jury prize "for an innovative approach to programming a music radio station", and in 2017, the LikeParty festival received an award in the category "best off-air project for promoting a radio station". This award was also received by some other Serikov's programs. In 2020, for the project of integrating the voice assistant Yandex.Alisa as the host of Like FM, Denis Serikov received another Radio Mania award.
