= Telecommunications in Jordan =

Jordan has a highly developed communications infrastructure. Jordan's telecom infrastructure is growing at a very rapid pace and continually being updated and expanded. Communications in Jordan occur across many media, including telephone, radio, television, and internet.

== Telephone ==
50% of households have at least one main line telephone. As of 2010, 103% of the population has a cell phone; 15% have more than one.

- Telephones - main lines in use: 622,600 (as of 2003)
- Telephones - mobile cellular: 6,250,000 (as of September 2010)
- Digital Radio Trunking:100,000 (Unofficial, Nov'07)

In mid 2004, XPress Telecom was launched as the country's digital radio trunking operator.

- Telephone system: The service has improved recently with the increased use of digital switching equipment, but better access to the telephone system is needed in some rural areas and easier access to pay telephones is needed by the urban public.

domestic: Microwave radio relay transmission and coaxial and fiber-optic cable are employed on trunk lines; considerable use is made of mobile cellular systems; Internet service is available.

international: satellite earth stations - 3 Intelsat, 1 Arabsat, and 29 land and maritime Inmarsat terminals; fiber-optic cable to Saudi Arabia and microwave radio relay link with Egypt and Syria; connection to international submarine cable FLAG (Fiber-Optic Link Around the Globe); participant in MEDARABTEL; international links total about 4,000.

== Radio ==
- Radios: 1.66 million (as of 1997)

=== Media and Communications Providers ===
- Seagulls - www.seagullscommunications.com

=== FM Stations ===
Play 99.6; BBC Arabic; Beat FM 102.5	Mazaj FM 95.3 FM; Hala FM; HD FM (Hala Dounia FM)	Radio Jordan French; Amman FM; Watan FM	Sawt Ma'an; Sunny 105.1; Virgin Radio Jordan	Radio Rotana; Radio Panorama; Radio Monte Carlo	Mood 92.0 FM; Ammannet; Radio Jordan FM	Melody FM; Radio Sawa; Yarmouk FM

== Television ==
- Television broadcast stations: 20 (plus 96 repeaters) (as of 1995)
- Televisions: 500,000 (as of 1997)

== PCs ==
40% of Jordanian households have a PC. This is expected to double in the coming years when the government reduces the sales tax on PCs and internet service in an effort to make Jordan the high-tech capital of the Middle East. The Jordanian Government is also providing every university student with a laptop in partnership with the private sector. All Jordan's schools are connected with internet service and the Jordanian Government is heavily purchasing computers and smart technology to be equipped in Jordan's classrooms.

== Internet ==
As of 2013, Internet penetration in Jordan was 63%. It was 50.5 percent by the end of 2011. Internet usage more than doubled from 2007 to 2009 with the rapid growth expected to continue. Telecommunications Regulatory Commission (TRC) figures indicate that Internet penetration stood at 29 per cent by the end of 2009 and 38 per cent by the end of 2010.

The Jordanian government has announced that the sales tax on computers and internet connection would be removed in order to further stimulate the ICT industry in Jordan. King Abdullah II told the BBC in 2004 that he hoped to make his country the tech hub of the Middle East. Jordan has more internet start up companies than any other country in the Middle East, and thus was dubbed the Middle East's "Silicon Valley". Amman was ranked as the 10th-best city in the world to launch a tech startup, according to a 2012 list compiled by Finaventures, a California-based venture-capital firm. Tech entrepreneurs have praised the ability to access high speed internet connections in Jordan, comparing this to Dubai and Saudi Arabia. Al Jami'a Street, in Jordan's northern city of Irbid, was ranked as the street with the highest number of internet cafes in the world by the Guinness World Records.

- Internet service providers (ISPs): 3,160 (as of 2004)
- Internet users:: 3.163 million (as of September 2011)
- Country code top-level domain (ccTLD): .JO

== Past ==
The IT industry in Jordan in the year 2000 and beyond got a very big boost after the Gulf War of 1991. This boost came from a large influx of immigrants from the Gulf countries to Jordan, mostly from Jordanian expatriates from Kuwait, totaling few hundred thousands. This large wave impacted Jordan in many ways, and one of them was on its IT industry.

== Future ==
When King Abdullah II ascended to the throne in 1999, he stated his intentions to turn Jordan into the high-tech capital of the Middle East and to create a Silicon Valley-like venture in Jordan. All Jordanian schools are equipped with computers and internet connection and instituted an ICT curriculum into Jordan's education system. ICT faculties were established in Jordanian universities and these campuses have been churning out 15,000 ICT graduates every year. Information access centers were established across the Kingdom to allow rural areas access to the Internet.

The number of phone lines has decreased dramatically in the past three years to below 500K telephone lines, due to the introduction of WI-Max technology and 3G networks.

== See also ==
- Jordan Radio and Television (JRTV)
- ATV Jordan
- Jordan Cable Services (JCS)
- Orange Jordan
- Umniah
- XPress
- Zain Jordan
