= Telephone numbers in Jordan =

- Country: Jordan
- Continent: Asia
- Numbering plan type: closed
- Country code: +962
- International access: 00
- Long-distance: 0

Telephone numbers in Jordan use the country calling code +962, with 00 as the international call prefix and 0 as the domestic trunk prefix. Fixed-line numbers use geographic area codes: 2 for northern Jordan, 3 for southern Jordan, 5 for Zarqa, and 6 for Amman. Mobile numbers use prefixes beginning with 7; the article lists 77 for Orange, 78 for Umniah, and 79 for Zain. Prefixes beginning with 8 are used for free lines and those beginning with 9 for service lines.

== Number format ==
Fixed Land line +962 787833422

  +962 Jordan   6  city Amman  ..# .

Mobile phones +962 79 999 9999 (the first three numbers after 962 can be either 079, 078, 077, 075)

   +962 Jordan   7X operator ID

== Local area codes ==
- 2 Northern Area (Irbid, Ajloun, Jerash, Mafraq)
- 3 Southern Area (Tafilah, Karak, Ma'an, Aqaba, Petra)
- 5 Zarqa
- 6 Amman
- 7 Mobile Phones
  - 77x Orange
  - 78x Umniah
  - 79x Zain
- 8 Free Lines
- 9 Service Lines

== See also ==
- Telecommunications in Jordan
