= Anton Komolov =

Russian radio and television presenter

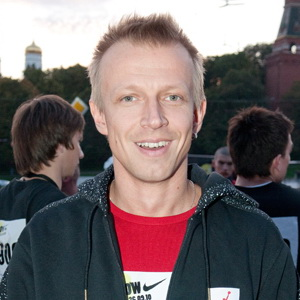
- Born: April 4, 1976 (age 50); Moscow
- Education: Bauman Moscow State Technical University
- Years active: 1994 — present

Anton Igorevich Komolov (Russian: Антон Игоревич Комолов; born April 4, 1976, Moscow, RSFSR, USSR) is a Russian radio and TV presenter of entertainment programs, a DJ, an actor of dubbing, a showman.

== Biography ==
He was born on April 4, 1976, in Moscow. His father was an engineer, his mother a philologist. Even in early childhood, the boy's abilities were manifested: at the age of 3 he was taught to read, and by the age of 6 he had already read such works as Chekhov's stories and the novel 'Anna Karenina'.

In the 10th and 11th grades he studied at the Physics and Mathematics School No. 1180 (now Lyceum No. 1580). Then he entered the Bauman Moscow State Technical University, who graduated in 1999 with the qualification engineer in Computer-aided design specialty. While studying at the university, Anton became a member of the KVN team of the MSTU. Who in 1997-1998 became the winner of the Moscow League of KVN. In March 2000, Anton was given the opportunity to take a place of honour among members of the jury of the Higher League.

In 1994, on the announcement, he came to work for Radio Maximum as an attendant and a freelance correspondent. Collaborated with numerous radio stations

On television first appeared in 1997, making his debut as a host on BIZ-TV. In September 1998 he began to work on the TV channel MTV Russia, where he gained fame and popularity. Anton was the host of the programs 'Big Cinema' along with Yana Churikova and Playstation with Tatyana Gevorkyan.

Since September 5, 2011, paired with Elena Abitayeva is a radio station Europa Plus.

Together with Olga Shelest voiced the advertisement IPhone 6. In 2010, the name of Anton Komolov named a new species of protists, Acanthocystis antonkomolovi (Centroheliozoa).

== Awards and nominations ==
- TEFI: best entertainment program leader (2001), sport program (2015) — nominations
- Radiomania: best leading programs, shows (along with Olga Shelest).

== Personal life ==
Anton's wife is Vladlena. In November 2006, their son Andrey was born.
