= Tatyana Gevorkyan =

Russian TV presenter, journalist and actress

- Born: Tatyana Grigorievna Gevorkyan; 20 April 1974 (age 52); Moscow, RSFSR, USSR
- Website: http://gevorkian.ru

Tatyana Grigorievna Gevorkyan (Russian: Татья́на Григо́рьевна Геворкя́н; April 20, 1974, Moscow, RSFSR, USSR) is a Russian TV presenter, journalist and actress.

== Biography ==
She was born on April 20, 1974 in Moscow. Parents engaged in the rental of Soviet cinema abroad, travelled extensively.

She studied at schools in different countries, and graduated from school in India.

In her school years she was fond of drawing, dancing, got a brown belt in karate, collected car models, and learned to play guitar.

She entered the film science faculty at the correspondence department of VGIK. she entered, and lived a year in India in Delhi, where at the Delhi's Jesus and Mary College studied English literature, philosophy and logic. In 2002 she graduated from VGIK.

In 1995, the press attaché for Radio Maximum began to work. Since September 1998, she has conducted the Stilissimo and Style Guide programs on MTV Russia. Together with Anton Komolov, she led the program Playstation and The Higher Test. In 2002 to 2004, together with Ivan Urgant, she conducted the evening show Expresso.

In 2008, she released a collection of footwear under the brand name Tanya Gevorkyan.

From January 2010 to December 2011 she was co-host of the program Girls on the channel Russia 1.

From January 2011 to December 2016 she led the program Culture News on the channel Russia-K.

Since January 22, 2017 the leader of the second season of the program In Style on the channel U, and since January 30 of the same year he also conducts the program The Business Morning of NTV.

She was a columnist in a number of women's magazines.
