= Radio Waves =

Radio Waves may refer to:

- Radio waves, a type of electromagnetic radiation

== Music ==
=== Albums ===
- Radio Waves (The Black Sorrows album), 1996
- Radio Waves (Seigmen album), 1997
- Radio Waves (Joan Osborne album), 2022
- Radio Waves, by Rob Schneiderman, 1991
- Radio Waves, a comedy album by Bob & Tom, 2009

=== Songs ===
- "Radio Waves" (Eli Young Band song), 2009
- "Radio Waves" (Roger Waters song), 1987
- "Radio Waves", by OMD from Dazzle Ships, 1983

== Other uses ==
- Radio Waves (radio station), a radio station in Bhutan
- Radio Waves (TV series), a 1978 New Zealand television series
- Radio Waves (novella), a 1995 novella by Michael Swanwick
- Radio Waves: Life and Revolution on the FM Dial, a 1991 book by Jim Ladd

== See also ==
- Radio Wave 96.5, a defunct radio station in Blackpool, England
- Wave radio (disambiguation)
