= Serikov =

Serikov (Russian: Сериков, Ukrainian: Сєріков) or female form Serikova (Russian: Серикова, Ukrainian: Сєрікова) is a surname of Slavic-language origin. Notable people with this surname include:

- Artyom Serikov (born 2000), Russian ice hockey player
- Denis Serikov, Russian media manager
- Dmitri Serikov (born 1976), Abkhazian politician
- Ilya Serikov (born 1995), Russian footballer
- Kiril Serikov (born 1982), Russian luger
- Oksana Serikova (born 1985), Ukrainian swimmer
- Saylau Serikov (1940–1991), Soviet politician
- Shamil Serikov (1956–1989), Soviet Wrestler
