= Sunshine Radio =

Sunshine Radio may refer to:

- Sunshine Radio (Ludlow), a radio station covering South Shropshire, North Herefordshire and North Worcestershire
- Sunshine Radio (Herefordshire and Monmouthshire), a radio station based in Hereford
- Sunshine 1530, a defunct station formerly operated by Murfin Media
- Sunshine Radio, a defunct Irish pirate station, which operated in the 1980s
- Sunshine 106.8, a radio station broadcasting to Dublin, Ireland since 2010
- Sunshine Radio (Thailand), a community radio station broadcasting to Pattaya, Hat Yai, and Phuket
