= Wave radio =

Wave radio can refer to:

- Bose wave systems
- WAVE Radio, a Belize City radio station
- Waves Radio, a former radio station based in Peterhead

== See also ==
- Radio Waves (disambiguation)
- Radio Wave 96.5
- Wave FM (originally Wave 102), former Scottish radio station broadcasting to the cities of Dundee and Perth
- Wave 105, former radio station based in Fareham, England
- Hits Radio South Wales, formerly The Wave
