= FX (Russia & Eastern Europe) =

Russian pay television channel owned by Disney

- Country: Russia
- Broadcast area: Armenia; Azerbaijan; Estonia (local version); Georgia; Kazakhstan; Kyrgyzstan; Latvia; Lithuania; Moldova; Ukraine
- Headquarters: Tallinn, Estonia

Programming
- Languages: Russian; English; Lithuanian (subtitles); Latvian (subtitles); Estonian (subtitles)
- Picture format: HDTV 1080i (downscaled to 16:9 576i for the SDTV feed)
- Timeshift service: FX HD +1 (formerly)

Ownership
- Owner: The Walt Disney Company CIS (Disney Entertainment)
- Parent: 20th Century Television
- Sister channels: REN TV; FX Life; National Geographic; National Geographic Wild; BabyTV

History
- Launched: 30 October 2007; 19 years ago (Baltics); 5 March 2008; 18 years ago (Russia & CIS)
- Closed: 1 October 2022; 4 years ago (Russia & Belarus)
- Replaced by: Kineko (Russia)
- Former names: Fox Crime (2007-2012); Fox (2012-2024)

Links
- Website: https://www.fxchannel.ee/

Final logo as Fox, used from 2019 to 2024

Final logo as Fox Crime, used from 2007 to 2012

FX (formerly Fox and Fox Crime) is a Russian language pay television channel launched on 30 October 2007 in the Baltics and on 5 March 2008 in Russia and CIS countries. On 1 October 2012, the channel was renamed to Fox. In 2022, Disney announced the channel would cease broadcasting in Russia and Belarus, and would be replaced by Kineko. However, it continues to broadcast in the Baltics and CIS without advertising. The channel has rebranded to FX on 24 January 2024.

== Censorship ==
Some episodes of 9-1-1: Lone Star that featured same-sex couple were cut due to an anti-LGBT propaganda law.

== Programming ==
=== Current programming ===
- 9-1-1
- 9-1-1 Lone Star
- The Bear
- Bones
- Criminal Minds (Note: Also present on Fox Crime Russia)
- M.O.D.O.K
- Solar Opposites
- This Is Us
- Tracker
- The Walking Dead
- Will Trent
- Central Park

=== Former programming ===
==== As Fox ====
- According to Jim
- Agents of S.H.I.E.L.D.
- Arrow
- Big Sky
- The Booth at the End
- Big Sky
- Breaking Bad
- The Bridge
- The Brink
- City Homicide
- Common Law
- Cracked
- Da Vinci's Demons
- Dexter
- Episodes
- The Following
- Game of Thrones
- Go On
- Harrow
- How to Get Away with Murder
- Hustle
- In Plain Sight
- Inspector Rex
- Intelligence
- Law & Order
- The Listener
- Luther
- NCIS
- NCIS: Los Angeles
- The Neighbors
- Numbers
- NYC 22
- Once Upon a Time
- Person of Interest
- Quantico
- Red Widow
- Republic of Doyle
- Resident Alien
- Scrubs
- Sherlock
- Silent Witness
- The Sopranos
- Spooks
- Two and a Half Men
- Weeds
- What We Do in the Shadows
- The Wire

==== As Fox Crime ====
- Blind Justice
- Boardwalk Empire
- Castle
- Countdown – Die Jagd beginnt
- Death in Paradise
- Detroit 1-8-7
- The Division
- JAG
- Justified
- Killer in the Family
- Law & Order: Criminal Intent
- Law & Order: LA
- Law & Order: Special Victims Unit
- Life
- Mad Dogs
- Man on a Ledge
- Missing
- Murder, She Wrote
- Profiler
- Rush
- Scott & Bailey
- Snapped
- Spooks
- Spy School
- Underbelly
- Unsolved
- Wanted
- Whitechapel
- World's Greatest Gambling Scams
