= Tribuna (Russian newspaper) =

Russian weekly newspaper

- Owner(s): Gazprom Media
- Founded: July 1, 1969; 56 years ago
- Website: www.tribuna.ru

Tribuna (Russian: Трибуна) is a weekly Russian newspaper that focuses largely on industry and the energy sector.

== History ==
Tribunas published its first publication in July 1969. Until 1990, the newspaper titled the Sotsialisticheskaya Industriya, then it was renamed into the Rabochaya Tribuna. In 1989 the newspaper was closed by the CPSU Central Committee; one year later it was reorganized as Rabochaya Tribuna.

Since April 1998 for newspaper fixed the current title. Since the 2000s (decade) it is owned by media holding Gazprom Media. Oleg Kuzin has been serving as chief-editor since 2004.

== Awards and recognitions ==
In 2009, on its 40th anniversary, the newspaper was awarded the national Iskra prize in the special category For a significant contribution to the development of civil society.
