= Nashe Radio =

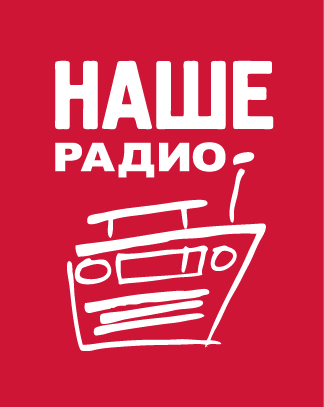
- "Our music - our radio. [Proudly] Made in Russia." (Наша музыка — наше радио. Сделано в России.)
- Moscow; Russia
- Broadcast area: Russia; Kazakhstan; Finland
- Frequencies: 101.8 MHz (Moscow); 104 MHz (Saint Petersburg)

Programming
- Language: Russian
- Format: Russian rock

Ownership
- Owner: CJSC "Multimedia Holding"; (Nashe Radio CJSC (El FS No. 77-48384 dated January 27, 2012))

History
- Founded: December 14, 1998

Technical information
- Licensing authority: Roskomnadzor

Links
- Website: https://www.nashe.ru/

Nashe Radio (Russian: Наше радио, Our Radio, pronounced Nashe radio) is a Russian Rock music radio station. It was designed to promote Russian rock bands, as opposed to pop and Western music. Nashe is based in Moscow and broadcast in every major Russian city as well as through the internet stream. It was founded in 1998 by former Radio Maximum producer Mikhail Kozyrev.

Popular bands aired on Nashe include Zemfira, Aria, DDT, Kino, Splin, Bi-2, and many others, including Ukrainian and Belarusian bands, which are never considered foreign. The music style ranges from pop rock to heavy metal to folk rock and reggae, but Nashe's mainstream is 80's style classic rock and modern pop punk.

Nashe Radio chart, "Chart Dozen" (Chartova duzhina, play on "Devil's dozen", as the chart consists of 13 positions), updated weekly, is the major rock music chart in Russia. Since 2003, yearly results of chart are celebrated in annual indoor "Chart Dozen" festival. Since 2008, annual music award of the same name is presented to yearly chart winners on this festival.

Nashe Radio organize the largest annual open air rock festival in Russia, Nashestvie. It has been held since 1999 until 2019 and usually attracts from 50,000 to 100,000 spectators.

Nashe Radio is owned and operated by CJSC Multimedia Holding (Mul'timedia Kholding), which is owned by Russkoye Radio founder Vitaly Bogdanov.

== History ==
In 1998, Mikhail Kozyrev was dismissed from his position as program director of the radio station Maximum. During a forced leave, he received an offer from Boris Berezovsky to establish a new radio station focused on Russian rock music. Kozyrev accepted the proposal. Thus, the new station, named Nashe Radio ("Our Radio"), began broadcasting on 14 December 1998 via the frequency of the news-oriented "Radio NSN", debuting with the song V Nashikh Glazakh ("In Our Eyes") by the band Kino. The station's playlist soon expanded to include Aquarium, DDT, Alisa, Grazhdanskaya Oborona, and other prominent groups. During its early years, the station also occasionally featured pop music acts such as Amega, Leonid Agutin, and Kristina Orbakaite.

Kozyrev initially defined the station's format as: "We aim to be a bit too old for teenagers and a bit too trendy for people over thirty-five". This approach positioned Nashe Radio as an antithesis to Russkoye Radio, then the sole major station broadcasting Russian-language music.

On 10–11 December 1999, the first Nashestvie festival was held at the Gorbunov Palace of Culture to mark the station’s first anniversary. The event became an annual tradition, solidifying the station’s cultural influence.

Nashe Radio played a pivotal role in revitalizing Russian rock, spurring the rise of a new generation of guitar-driven bands that resonated with youth audiences.

On 1 February 2005, Kozyrev stepped down as CEO of Ultra Production, the parent company managing Nashe Radio and Best FM. He later cited management’s dissatisfaction with economic performance metrics and his involvement in external television projects as reasons for his departure. At the time, the station remained financially viable, ranking 14th in TNS Gallup Media’s radio ratings (October–December 2004) with a 3.5% audience share. His successor, Mikhail Zotov, prioritized established bands already featured in the station’s rotation.

Between 2013 and 2014, program director Semyon Chayka attempted to diversify the playlist—which centered on 32 core bands—by introducing older groups like Distemper and newer acts such as Krasnoznamennaya Diviziya imeni Moyey Babushki and Naadya. After Chayka’s dismissal, the station reverted to its traditional format.

By 2022, the core audience consisted primarily of listeners aged 30 and older, though it retained a significant youth following.

On 9 July 2024, the station shifted its Moscow broadcast frequency from 101.7 MHz to 101.8 MHz to optimize radio frequency allocation.

== Criticism ==
The radio station has frequently faced criticism for its highly one-sided and subjective musical conservatism, with its playlist heavily reliant on songs from bands of the 1980s, 1990s, and 2000s. Listeners, including journalists, have often accused the station of excluding certain notable or respected rock groups—such as Sektor Gaza, Grazhdanskaya Oborona, Televizor, and others—due to its niche musical preferences, thereby presenting an incomplete portrayal of post-Soviet rock to its audience.

After his departure, Mikhail Kozyrev himself acknowledged both the conservatism of Nashe Radio's listeners, who resisted newer bands (a point echoed in 2012 by the station’s producer, Yekaterina Sundukova), and the stagnation of Russia’s rock music scene. Notably, during the 2000s, many emerging rock bands deliberately tailored their musical styles to align with the station’s rotation criteria.

In 2018, several artists and bands boycotted the Nashestvie festival, organized by the radio station, protesting its overtly militaristic themes tied to its collaboration with the Russian Ministry of Defence.

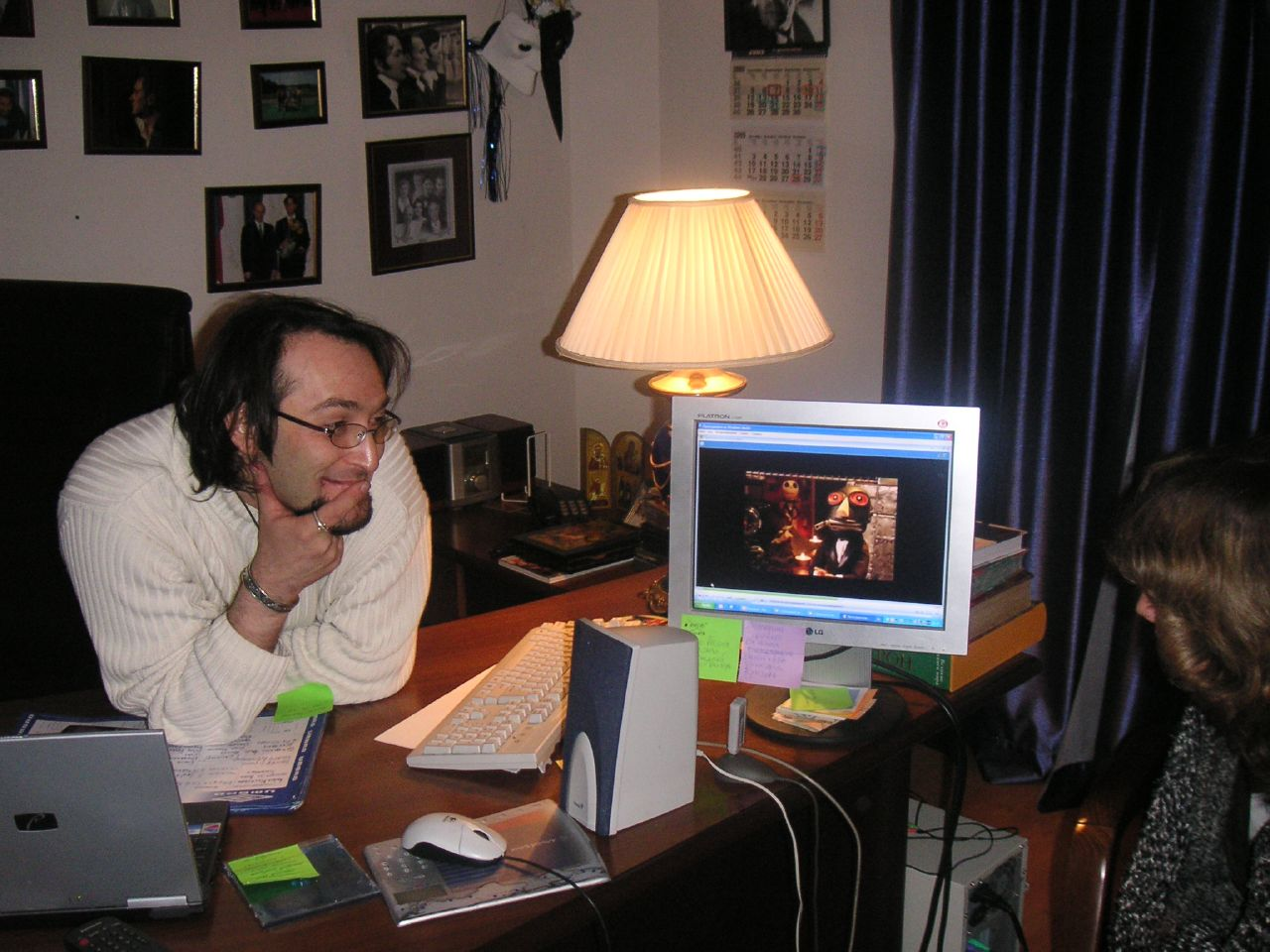
Mikhail Kozyrev, Nashe's founder

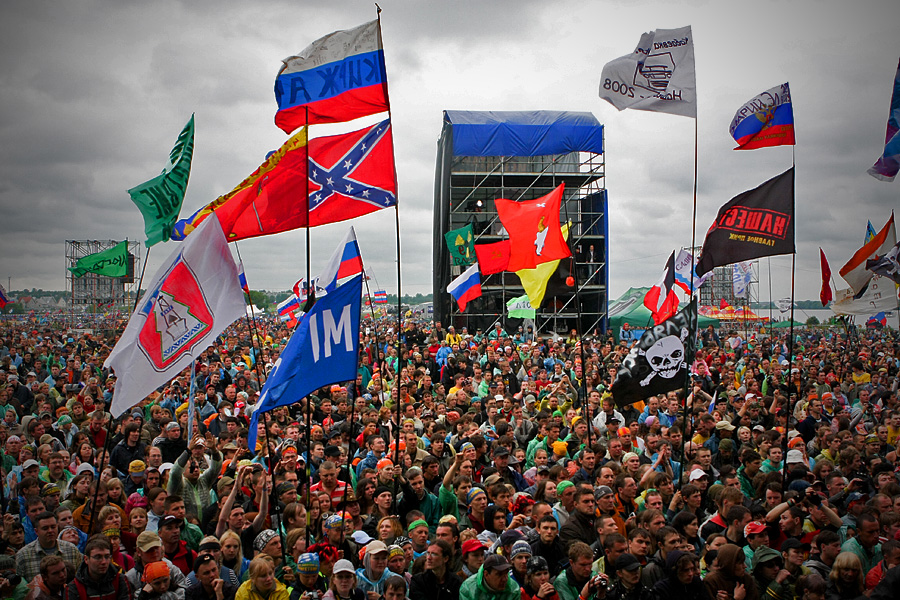
Nashestvie Open Air 2008
