= Energy Russia =

- Moscow; Russia
- Broadcast area: Russia
- Frequency: 104.2 MHz (Moscow)

Programming
- Language: Russian
- Format: Top-40

Ownership
- Owner: Gazprom-Media; (GPM Radio CJSC)
- Sister stations: AvtoRadio; Comedy Radio; Detskoe Radio; Like FM; Radio Romantika (Moscow); Radio Zenit (Saint Petersburg); Relax FM; Yumor FM

History
- First air date: 2006

Links
- Website: energyfm.ru

Energy Russia is a private Russian radio station, created in 2006 based in Moscow, and is the Russian version of the French NRJ. The playlist of the radio station is made up of the most popular songs (hence the new slogan of the radio station is "Hit Music Only").

== History ==
On March 8, 2003, Radio Energy was created by the Prof Media group (formerly under Interros and now under Gazprom-Media), and then dedicated to dance, house and trance music. The radio station is popular among young people. The station also used to host numerous dance music festivals every year, the most famous being 'Energiya Megadance'.

In April 2006 the average daily number of listeners was 529,000, or a 5.6% of the total number of listeners in the Moscow Region, according to Prof Media/VKPM.

On 1 September 2006, the Prof Media group accepted to rebrand its station Radio Energy, to become the NRJ brand, which also has other versions internationally. It is no longer an NRJ Group station.

== Broadcasting area ==
Energy Russia broadcasts throughout Russia. In the capital Moscow and its region, it broadcasts on 104.2 MHz. The radio station is also available on the internet.
