= Dorognoye Radio =

Russian radio station

Dorozhnoye Radio
Russia Saint Petersburg Russia Moscow; Russia Finland Estonia Transnistria
- Frequencies: 87.5 MHz – Saint Petersburg; 96.0 MHz – Moscow

Programming
- Format: Pop, Urban romance, Chanson, Retro music

Ownership
- Owner: European Media Group; (LLC "Center for New Technologies")
- Sister stations: Europa Plus; Europa Plus TV; Eldoradio (Saint Petersburg); Kalina Krasnaya; Novoye Radio; Radio 7 (exc. Saint Petersburg); Retro FM; Studio 21; Keks FM (online)

History
- First air date: 24 July 2003 (Saint Petersburg); 29 September 2010 (Moscow) Voyazh FM (Moscow)

Technical information
- Licensing authority: Roskomnadzor (Certificate No. EL FS 77-61841 (18 May 2015))
- Transmitter coordinates: Moscow, Stanislavskogo Street, 21

Links
- Webcast: dorognoe.ru
- Website: Official website

"Dorognoye Radio" (Russian: «Доро́жное ра́дио») is a Russian radio station owned by the European Media Group (EMG).

== History ==
In 2003, the idea of creating a radio network emerged. It began broadcasting in Saint Petersburg at 68.66 MHz and in Kirishi at 103.0 FM. By spring 2005, it started broadcasting in the FM band in Saint Petersburg at 87.5 MHz with the RDS call sign *DOPO*HOE SPB 87.5 FM*. Over time, the station expanded its coverage to other regions of Russia.

The station's format combines urban romance, popular chanson, and hits from Russian and Western pop music of the 1980s, 1990s, and 2000s. The ratio of Russian to foreign music is 85/15.

On March 1, 2010, "Dorognoye Radio" launched in Finland.

On September 30, 2010, "Dorognoye Radio" began broadcasting in Moscow at 96.0 FM, acquiring the frequency previously held by Voyazh FM. The RDS call sign became *DOPO*HOE MOSKVA 96.0 FM*.

Since 2012, the station has hosted the annual music award ceremony "Stars of Dorognoye Radio" (Звёзды Дорожного радио).

On March 3, 2014, the newspaper *Kommersant* confirmed a preliminary agreement between EMG and LLC "Center for New Technologies" (CNT), the owner of "Dorognoye Radio," regarding the acquisition of the station. The Federal Antimonopoly Service (FAS) received the application for approval in late February 2014. At the time, "Dorognoye Radio" operated in over 600 cities, ranking first in Saint Petersburg, second in nationwide daily audience share, and ninth in Moscow. Negotiations did not include CNT's other stations, "Radio dlya dvoykh" (Radio for Two) or "Radio Vanya".

On April 1, 2014, FAS approved EMG's bid after requesting additional documentation. Sources from *Kommersant* noted that Gazprom-Media had also expressed interest but declined due to the asking price of $60–70 million. The acquisition increased EMG's audience share in Moscow from 15% to 17.6% and in Saint Petersburg from 15.8% to 24.7%. The deal closed on April 14, 2014. In 2015–2016, the station's headquarters moved to Moscow, with its Saint Petersburg office becoming a branch.

The station operates thematic internet radio channels: *Nostalgia* (retro music), *Dancefloor* (featuring the program "Tantsy po-rossiyski" – "Russian-Style Dancing"), and *Rock Club*.

== Ratings ==
By 2014, the radio network ranked second in daily audience size in Russia, with approximately 10 million daily listeners and 23 million weekly listeners.

In 2015 and 2023, "Dorognoye Radio" secured 1st place among FM radio stations in Russia.
