= Aleksandr Zharov =

Russian politician

- Александр Жаров
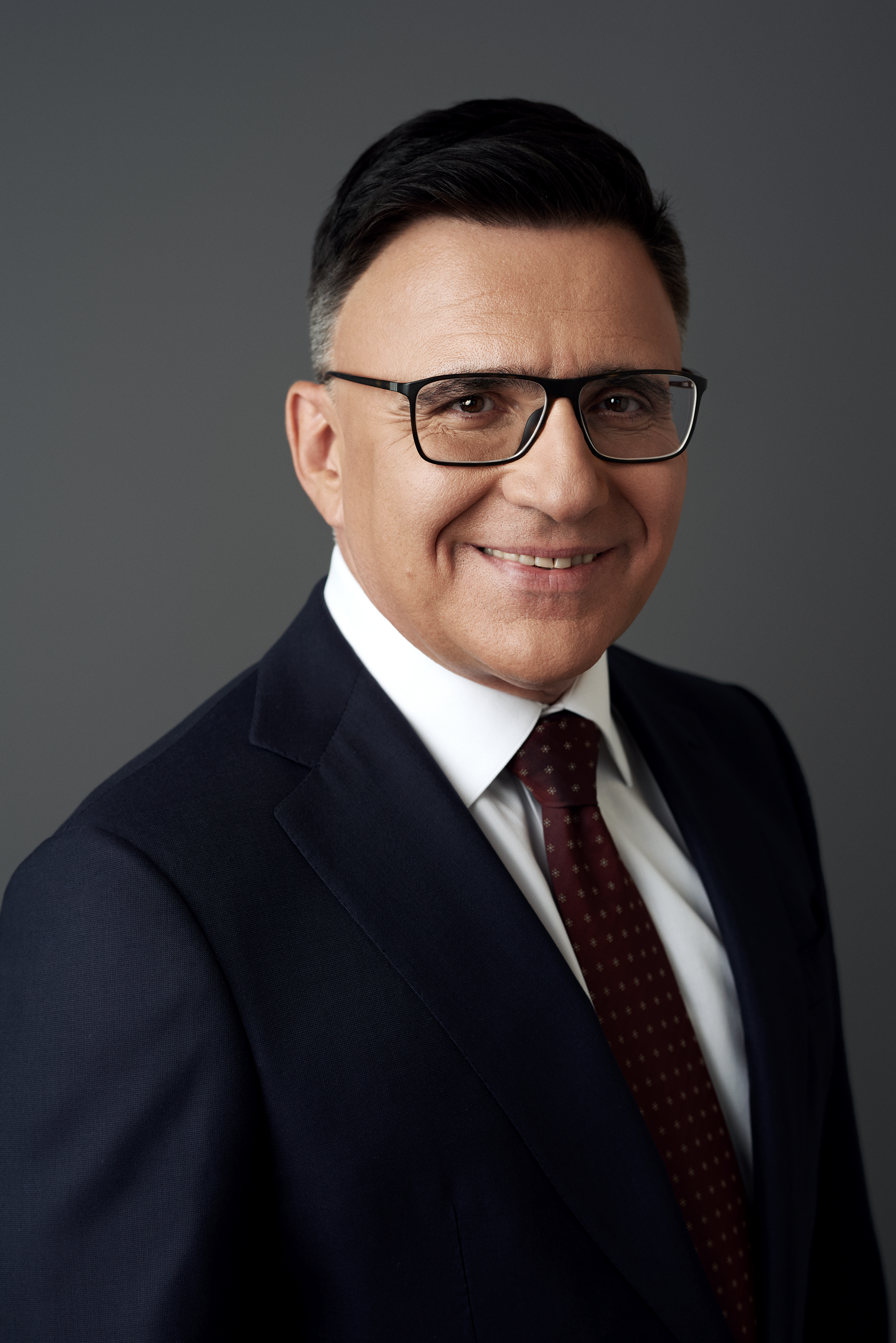
- Zharov in 2020

Head of Roscomnadzor
- In office 3 May 2012 – 23 March 2020
- Preceded by: Sergey Sitnikov
- Succeeded by: Andrey Lipov

Personal details
- Born: 11 August 1964 (age 62) Chelyabinsk, Chelyabinsk Oblast, Russian SFSR, Soviet Union

Aleksandr Aleksandrovich Zharov (also Alexander; Russian: Александр Александрович Жаров; born 11 August 1964) is a Russian politician. He served as head of Roskomnadzor (Federal Service for Supervision in the Sphere of Telecom, Information Technologies and Mass Communications) from 2012 to 2020.

He has the federal state civilian service rank of 1st class Active State Councillor of the Russian Federation.

== Biography ==
Aleksandr Aleksandrovich Zharov was born on 11 August 1964 in Chelyabinsk, Russian SFSR, Soviet Union.

Zharov studied medicine at the Chelyabinsk Medical Academy and graduated in 1987. His specialization is anesthesiologist and intensive care specialist. He worked at the Chelyabinsk Regional Clinical Hospital from 1987 to 1996.

He moved to Moscow in 1997 and worked for one year at the "Family Doctor: Practical Medical Advice" magazine. Later career:

- 1998 to 1999 — adviser to chairman of the board of the news agency RIA Novosti;
- 1999 to 2004 — spokesman of the Ministry of Health;
- 2004 to 2006 — spokesman of the Prime Minister
- 2006 to 2007 — deputy general director of the broadcasting company VGTRK;
- 2007 to 2008 — head of the Department of Press Service, Information and Protocol
- 2008 to 2012 — deputy Minister of Communications and Mass Media
- May 2012 — head of Roskomnadzor.

=== Sanctions ===
In April 2018, the United States imposed sanctions on Zharov and 23 other Russian nationals.

On 11 March 2022, Zharov was sanctioned by the British government in relation to the Russian invasion of Ukraine.

== Family ==
Zharov is married, his wife is a businesswoman, her name and business are not officially disclosed. They have 6 children.

== Education ==
- Chelyabinsk Medical Academy (1987) — anesthesiologist and intensive care specialist;
- F.F. Erisman Federal Research Center of Hygiene (2004) — Candidate of Sciences;
- Russian Presidential Academy of National Economy and Public Administration (2006) — law school.

Zharov has the class rank of 1st Class Government Councilor of State.

== Public image ==
Zharov is periodically criticized as the head of Roskomnadzor and within the scope of activities of this organization, sometimes called a "watchdog" threatening the media freedom in Russia, particularly the Internet in Russia (Runet).
Zharov argues that neither himself nor his organization initiate new limitations but has to follow existing laws and court rulings. He says in a private interview:

A chastener punishes innocents and Roskomnadzor punishes guilty ones. Unfortunately we have such a function and if we don't execute it then we worth nothing as a service for supervision.

Zharov became a Candidate of Sciences in 2004, his thesis was on "Medico-hygienic bases forming a healthy way of life in the Russian Federation" (Russian: "Медико-гигиенические основы формирования здорового образа жизни в Российской Федерации"). Upon analysis made by Dissernet, a substantial part (52 pages out of 145) has been taken unaltered or slightly altered from two state reports of the Ministry of Health (1998, 2002). Such reports as official documents of state government agencies are in public domain in Russia yet they have been used without attribution.
