= RBK TV =

Russian business news TV channel

RBC РБК
- Country: Russian Federation
- Broadcast area: CIS, EU
- Headquarters: Moscow, Russian Federation

Programming
- Picture format: 16:9 (576i, SDTV)

Links
- Website: tv.rbc.ru

RBC TV (Russian: РБК) is the first and only 24-hour business news television channel in Russia. It is owned and operated by the RBC Group. The channel was launched in September 2003 in partnership with the CNBC and CNN television channels.

== Programs ==
- "A Global Perspective"
- "Actual Interview" (Dialogue)
- "Adrenaline"
- "AutoNews"
- "Business with a high IQ"
- "Debate" (Forum)
- "Documentary history at RBC"
- "Financial News" (Markets)
- "Interactive Edition"
- "Leisure and Tourism"
- "Main News" (News)
- "Overview of the foreign press"
- "Overview of the Russian press"
- "Results of the week"
- "Stardust"
- "The World Today"
- "Thematic Discussion" (Sphere of Interest)
- "Weekend on Wheels"

=== Past in broadcasting ===
- "Accelerate"
- "All the first"
- "AutoNews Expert"
- "Business Books"
- "Business Style"
- "Capital"
- "C-News"
- "C-News: Technology of the Future"
- "Commercial break"
- "Companies"
- "Company News" (now published only in part of the "Markets")
- "Events"
- "Foreign Business"
- "Heroes of open markets"
- "In Focus"
- "Live with Savik Shuster"
- "Our money"
- "Our money. Interactive"
- "Peace in the Week"
- "Person"
- "Real Estate"
- "Salon"
- "The intrigue of the day"
- "The intrigue of the Week"
- "The intrigue of the Year"

=== Short Columns ===
- "Appointments and dismissals"
- "Exchange Rates"
- "Macroeconomic Statistics"
- "Question of the Day"
- "The World Today. No Comments"
- "Weather"
