= CRI Darhan =

Radio station in Mongolia

CRI Darhan at 103.7 FM is a radio station in Darkhan, Mongolia. It is part of China Radio International. It broadcasts primarily in English. According to China Radio International, this is the second overseas radio station launch after CRI Nairobi Kenya 91.9 FM.
