= Beat FM 102.5 =

102.5 Beat FM
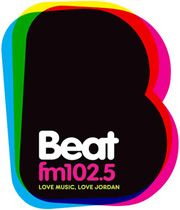

Amman; Jordan
- Frequency: 102.5 MHz

Programming
- Language: English
- Format: Contemporary hit radio

Ownership
- Owner: Seagulls Broadcast Ltd.

History
- First air date: January 28, 2005

Technical information
- Power: 1.67 kilowatts
- ERP: 3 kW

Links
- Website: Official Website

102.5 Beat FM is a radio station located in Amman, Jordan. The station is owned by Seagulls Broadcast Ltd. and was established in 2005.

== History ==
102.5 Beat FM has sought to further expose its listeners to international music and events. In doing so 102.5 Beat FM has organized a number of local and international events throughout Jordan such as Hed Kandi's DJs debuts in Jordan, Karaoke World Championships, Global Battle of the Bands, Wedding Bonanza "Press Release", Beat the Best "Press Release" and flying winners to watch their favorite sporting events and stars LIVE in concert in many countries in the world, such as:

- The 2014 FIFA World Cup (June 2014)
- Rihanna Diamonds Tour World Tour in Abu Dhabi (October 2013)
- Energy NRJ Music Tour (June 2013)
- Creamfields Dance Festival in Abu Dhabi (December 2012)
- Jennifer Lopez in Dubai (November 2012)
- David Guetta in Abu Dhabi (March 2012)
- Britney Spears in Abu Dhabi (November 2011)
- Shakira and Amr Diab in Abu Dhabi (April 2011)
- Usher Live in Abu Dhabi (March 2011)
- Armin Van Buuren Mirage Concert in Beirut (January 2011)
- Tiësto in Beirut (July 2008)
- Christina Aguilera in Abu Dhabi, UAE (October 2008)
- Dubai Desert Rock Festival (March 2008). Artists Included Muse, Korn, Machine Head, Velvet Revolver
- Justin Timberlake in Abu Dhabi (December 2007)
- Pink in Dubai (September 2007)
- Aerosmith in Dubai (May 2007)
- Shakira in Dubai (March 2007)
- Dubai Desert Rock Festival 2007 (March 2007). Artists Include: Iron Maiden, Incubus, The Prodigy
- Apocalyptica in Beirut (June 2006)
- Dubai Desert Rock Festival (March 2006). Artists Include: 3 Doors Down, Megadeth
- Bryan Adams in Dubai (March 2006)
- Destiny's Child in Dubai (May 2005)
- U2 at Stade De France in Paris (July 2005)
- Anger Management Tour (Eminem, 50 Cent, D12, G-Unit, Lil Jon and the East Side Boyz) at Madison Square Garden in New York (August 2005)
- Tiësto in Beirut (October 2005)
- Cheer for your Team where one winner got to watch the final World Cup match in Brazil (May 2014)
- Dub it to Smash it with LG (Match 2015)

== Target audience ==
Targeted to serve all tastes, 102.5 Beat FM airs 24/7 and includes different music genres including Pop, Hip hop, R&B, Rap, Dance, House, Funk, Rock and Trance all delivered in a Top 40 style. Its prime target audience is 24-year-old females. 102.5 Beat FM targets people from the middle and high social classes, males and females, aged between 18 and 30 who wish to catch up on the latest music.

== General references ==
- Beat FM at the Charity Bowling 2
- Launching Beat FM 1025's New Website
- Wedding Bonanza 2
- Wedding Bonanza 3
- Wedding Bonanza 4
