= Keks FM (Russia) =

Russian radio station

Keks FM was a Russian language adult hits radio station of the European Media Group (EMG) which formerly aired via terrestrial radio in Moscow, Russia on 89.9 MHz, Saint Petersburg, Russia on 91.1 MHz and Voronezh, Russia on 102.3 MHz. The stations' format was based on that of Jack FM's.

The station currently airs online via the website of Dorognoe Radio, which is also owned by EMG.

== See also ==
- Jack FM
- Adult hits
