= Sunshine Radio (Thailand) =

Radio station in Thailand

Coordinates: 12.924349°N 100.873389°E

Sunshine Radio (Thailand) is a community radio station in Thailand which plays Thai adult contemporary music. It broadcasts in Pattaya, Hat Yai and Phuket. Its slogan is "Good Life, Good Music".

== Stations ==
- Sunshine Radio Pattaya 104.75

== Former stations ==
- Sunshine Radio Songkhla 94.5
- Sunshine Radio Chiangmai 105.75
- Sunshine Radio Hat Yai 103.0
- Sunshine Radio Phuket 96.75

== Frequencies ==
- 103.0 MHz covers Hat Yai District, some parts of Songkhla Province, Pattani Province, Yala Province and Satun Province and also parts of northern Kedah in Malaysia.
- 96.7 MHz covers Phuket and some parts of Phang Nga and Krabi provinces.
- 104.7 MHz covers Pattaya and some parts of Chonburi, Chachoengsao, Chanthaburi and Rayong provinces.
