= Radio Record =

Saint Petersburg; Russia
- Frequencies: Saint Petersburg: 106.3 MHz (FM); Moscow: 89.9 MHz (FM)

Programming
- Format: Electronic dance music

Ownership
- Owner: Lyudmila Alexandrovna Reznikova; (Radio Record joint-stock company)

History
- First air date: August 22, 1995

Links
- Website: Radio Record

Radio Record is a Russian radio station that broadcasts on 106.3 FM from Saint Petersburg. It airs an electronic dance music format with primarily trance and house offerings now expanded to variety of different genres including Deep House, Future House, Dubstep.

Radio Record can be listened by using its FM frequency or its website. Also available by using its mobile apps.

== History ==
Radio Record began broadcasting on August 22, 1995. The station's founder and current owner is Lyudmila Alexandrovna Reznikova (nee Kolchugina), the widower of the late Russian composer and music producer Viktor Reznikov. It was originally recorded from a small office. It was the first radio station to switch to the dance format and this was based on a vote from the listening audience. Since 2004, the radio station began broadcasting via satellite to the European territory of Russia.

In 2018 more genres has been added to the station including Neurofunk, Techtonik, 2-Step, Trance Hits, Pop Hits, Euro Dance, Liquid Funk, House Classics, Progressive, Electro, Synthwave, Moombahton, Jungle, Hypnotic, Technopop, Disco/Funk, Drum 'n' Bass Hits.

== Programs ==
- Radio Record — The main radio show playing many different tracks including tracks picked from its sub-programs like Record EDM, Future House etc. It often plays many remixed pop music as well.
- Мегамикс (Megamix) — Airs 100 tracks per hour with different tracks mixed.
- Record Deep — Program for Deep House music.
- Record EDM — Formally known as Record Club, now plays different kinds of EDM music and often picked for the main radio show.
- Future House — Program made for Future House music.
- Trancemission — Program for Trance music. Currently the main record label for DJ Feel.
- Record Chill-Out — Program for mellow style music known as Chill-Out.
- Minimal/Tech — Program for Tech House type music.
- Pirate Station — Program for Drum & Bass music.
- Russian Mix — Program for remixed Russian music.
- VIP House — Program dedicated to House music.
- Супердискотека 90-х — Program dedicated to music from the 90s.
- Record Breaks — Program for Break music.
- Record Dubstep — Program for Dubstep music.
- Record Dancecore — Program for fast-paced and old styled Trance music.
- Record Techno — Program for Techno music including old Techno music.
- Record Hardstyle — A program for Hardstyle music.
- Record Trap — Program for Trap music.
- Pump — Program for playing Hard House music, a genre originated from UK.
- Record Rock — Program dedicated to Rock music.
- Медляк FM (Medlyak FM) — A program for playing moderate music, pop music including country music.
- Гоп FM (Hope FM) — Program for Russian Techno, Dance, Pop, Country and R&B music.
- Yo! FM — Program for R&B and Rap (known as Hip-Hop) music.
- Rave FM — Program dedicated for Rave music.
- Neurofunk — Fast upbeat type Drum 'n' Bass music.
- Trancehouse — Techno, Progressive House from 2004 to 2011.
- 2-step — Sub-genre of UK garage emerged in England in the late 90s.
- Hypnotic — A program dedicated to UK Progressive and Tribal House.
- Trance Hits — Popular Trance music from artists such as Armin van Buuren.
- EDM Hits — Famous EDM style tracks played here.
- Uplifting — Dynamic Progressive Trance with a special bass in speed of 138 bpm.
- Record Darkside — Hard impact sounds, dark and heavy Drum 'n' Bass tunes.
- Big Hits — All time pop hits played here.
- Synthwave — Type of electronic music inspired by new wave and soundtracks of films, video games and television shows of the 1980s.
- Jackin'/Garage — From UK garage, jackin house and bassline house, fidget house and bass house tracks from leading representatives of the genre.
- Треш-шоу Кремова и Хрусталева (Kremov and Khrustalev's Thrash Show) — Comedy show featuring Kremov and Khrustalev.
- Record Club — Program dedicated to mixes of different club music from different popular DJs.
- Record Super Chart — Music ratings chart by DJ Feel. Ratings based on music that currently being played on the main radio show from no 1 - 33.
- СВЕЖАКИ (Fresh Tracks) — Program for showcasing new tracks.

=== Imported shows ===
- A State of Trance with Armin van Buuren
- Group Therapy with Above & Beyond
- Jacked Radio with Afrojack
- Smash The House with Dimitri Vegas & Like Mike
- Hardwell On Air with Hardwell
- Planet Perfecto with Paul Oakenfold
- Clublife by Tiesto with Tiesto
- Drumcode with Adam Beyer
- Heldeep Radio with Oliver Heldens
- The Martin Garrix Show with Martin Garrix
- Protocol Radio with Nicky Romero
- Mainstage Podcast with W&W
- Identity with Sander van Doorn
- The Fermentation Podcast with Kefir
- Trancemission Radioshow with DJ Feel
- Slam Radioshow with Magnit & Slider
- Smash The House Radio with Dimitri Vegas & Like Mike
- ЖАН & Rimsky Record Club with ЖАН & Rimsky
- Tooltoom Knights Radio with Mark Knight
- Planet Perfecto with Paul Oakenfold
- Gvozd Podcast with Gvozd
- Interplay Radioshow with Alexander Popov
- Universal Nation with Alex M.O.R.P.H.

== Record Megamix ==
Record Megamix is constructed as a 1-hour mix of currently played tracks from the main radio show. It features around 100 songs mixed by DJ Peretse which described as the best speedmixer.

Megamix is divided into small sections, each section featuring different tracks played at the same pitch and then it changes then moves to the next section.

== Audience ==
According to statistics from 2011, listeners are mainly from 15 to 35 years old. The station mainly focuses on a male youth audience. In 2011, the average daily audience of the radio station in Saint Petersburg was 350,000 people now expanded to worldwide.

== See also ==
- List of radio stations in Russia
