= Radio Waves (radio station) =

Defunct radio station in Bhutan

- Thimphu; Bhutan
- Frequency: 88.8 MHz

Programming
- Languages: Dzongkha & English

Ownership
- Owner: Kelzang Thinley

Radio Waves is a radio station in Bhutan. It is currently being run by Kelzang Thinley. It is located in Thimphu, just below Chubachu. The languages used by Radio Waves are Dzongkha and English. The frequency of Radio waves is 88.8 and it was formed on December 10, 2010. Like other private radio stations, it concentrated mainly on entertainment. It closed in 2013 due to problems in the private media sector.

== Broadcast Area ==
Currently Radio Waves broadcasts only in Thimphu.

== Programs ==
- Breakfast show
- Soo TarHaa
- Shh Taxi
- Gha Gho Dam
- Ni-Mei Gung
- Yesteryear wonder
- Your day Today
- Bhutanism
- Now Hits
- BIZ Bhutan
- News Feed
- Radio Greetings
- DJ Request
- Gong Tse Dom Chobgay
- SMS your Music
- Charts
- I-Pick
- Tec-spec

== Radio Jockeys ==
- Khandu Wangmo (Dzongkha)
- Pema Wangchuk, station manager (Dzongkha)
- Vinay Thapa (English)
- Kelzang Thinley (English)
