= Mazaj 95.3 FM =

- Amman; Jordan
- Frequency: 95.3 MHz

Programming
- Format: Arabic pop station

Ownership
- Owner: National Broadcast Ltd.

History
- First air date: 20 March 2005

Technical information
- Power: 800 watts
- ERP: 3 kilowatts

Links
- Website: https://mazaj.fm/

Mazaj 95.3 FM is a privately owned radio station located in Amman, Jordan. The station was established in 2005 and is owned by the National Broadcast Company, which was founded by Abu-Lughod Studios and Seagulls Broadcast Ltd.

== Format ==
The station focuses on giving its audience the latest Arabic pop music as well as popular Arabic hits played throughout the past decades.
