= Zain Jordan =

Telecommunications company

Jordan Mobile Telephone Services Company Ltd. Zain (Fastlink)
- Type: Public
- Industry: Communications services
- Founded: 1995; 31 years ago
- Headquarters: Amman, Jordan
- Key people: AbdulMalek Jaber, CEO
- Products: full mobile telephony service, SMS, MMS, other Mobile Cellular services
- Website: www.zain.jo

Zain Jordan (formerly Fastlink) is part of the Zain Group currently serving over 32 million active customers across the Middle East and Africa. Effective September 8, 2007, Zain is the new corporate master brand name for the Group (formerly Mobile Telecommunications Company), the leading mobile telecommunications provider in the Middle East and Africa. The Group now operates under the Zain brand in Jordan, Kuwait, Bahrain and Sudan. In Iraq, it is currently known as mtc-atheer; in Lebanon, as mtc-touch; and in 14 sub-Saharan countries in Africa as Celtel: Burkina Faso, Chad, Democratic Republic of the Congo, Republic of the Congo, Gabon, Kenya, Malawi, Madagascar, Niger, Nigeria, Sierra Leone, Tanzania, Uganda and Zambia.

Zain plans to commence operations in the Kingdom of Saudi Arabia in early 2008 and with the recent attainment of a 15-year nationwide license in Iraq, mtc atheer will soon rebrand to Zain. All other existing operations will be branded Zain in the near future as will all new or acquired operations.

In January 2007, the Group launched the ACE (Acceleration, Consolidation, Expansion) strategy to realize its 3x3x3 vision of becoming a top-ten global mobile operator by 2011. Zain is wholly owned by Mobile Telecommunications Company KSC and is listed on the Kuwait Stock Exchange (Stock ticker: ZAIN). The company's market capitalisation at 6 September 2007 exceeded US$30 billion.

Zain was the first Mobile Network to be set up in Jordan (under the brand name "fastlink") and is the largest (in terms of customers). It was founded in 1995

Though Zain - fastlink - was originally Jordanian when first established, it is now part of the mtc group, and operates by its standards.

On September 9, 2007, Fastlink became Zain, in a rebranding operation that MTC is planning to its whole group.

In May 2025, Zain Jordan partnered with Ericsson to modernize its Business Support Systems (BSS), transitioning to a cloud-native architecture.

In May 2025, Zain Jordan signed a strategic agreement with Jordan Gate to provide integrated telecommunications solutions for the Sixth Circle Towers project in Amman.
