= Mood 92.0 FM =

Mood FM
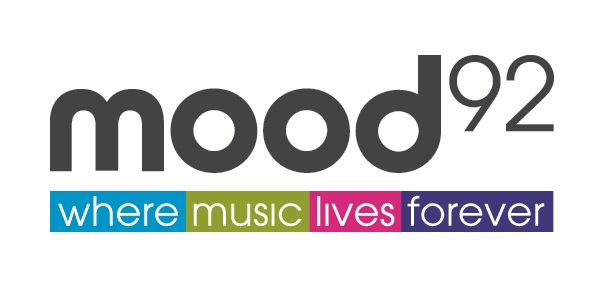
- Amman; Jordan
- Frequencies: 92.0 and 91.5 MHz

Programming
- Language: English
- Format: Soft adult contemporary

Ownership
- Owner: Seagulls Broadcast Ltd.
- Sister stations: 102.5 Beat FM / Mazaj 95.3/ Watar FM

History
- First air date: June 4, 2004

Technical information
- Class: Commercial pop music
- Power: 950 watts
- ERP: 3 kW

Links
- Website: www.mood.fm

Mood FM is a radio station broadcasting in Amman, Jordan. Mood FM is part of Seagulls Broadcast Ltd. and broadcasts on the 92.0 and 91.5 MHz frequency.
