= Europa Plus =

- "More Hits! More Music!" (Больше хитов! Больше музыки!)
- Russia
- Broadcast area: 15+ countries
- Frequency: 106.2 MHz (Moscow)

Programming
- Format: Hot adult contemporary

Ownership
- Owner: European Media Group; (Europa Plus JSC)
- Sister stations: Europa Plus TV; Dorognoye Radio; Eldoradio (Saint Petersburg); Kalina Krasnaya; Novoye Radio; Radio 7 (exc. Saint Petersburg); Retro FM; Studio 21; Keks FM (online)

History
- First air date: April 30, 1990

Links
- Website: www.europaplus.ru

Europa Plus (Russian: Европа Плюс, romanized: Evropa Plyus) is a Russian commercial radio station. It is owned by the European Media Group and started broadcasting on 30 April 1990 in the Soviet Union. The station primarily plays hot AC and Top 40 music.

Europa Plus spans across Russia, Latvia, Belarus, Ukraine, Moldova, Armenia, Georgia, Kazakhstan, Uzbekistan, and Kyrgyzstan. In a number of towns, Europa Plus has local programming.

== History ==
Europa Plus was created by Georges Polinski, president of the French radio network Kiss FM, who came up with the idea of a commercial radio station in the USSR during his vacation in Greece in October 1988. In June 1989, Kiss FM and Radio Yunost (represented by Deputy Chairman Valentin Lazutkin) signed a contract to establish first non-state commercial radio station, Europa Plus Moscow. The controlling stake (51%) was owned by the French company Europe Plus France, while the remaining 49% belonged to the foreign trade association Sovteleexport (a subsidiary of the USSR State Committee for Television and Radio Broadcasting).

The station went on air on April 30, 1990, at 19:00. The first song played on Europa Plus was John Lennon's "Imagine". Broadcasting in Moscow was conducted on ultra-shortwave (69.8 MHz) and mediumwave (1116 kHz).

On November 9, 1990, Europa Plus initiated the creation of the Russian Association of Independent Broadcasting in Moscow. On January 12, 1991, Europa Plus began broadcasting in Leningrad (now Saint Petersburg) on 72.68 FM. The third city in the Europa Plus network was Samara (71.27 FM), followed by Nizhny Novgorod (73.01 FM), Tolyatti (68.09 FM), and Volgograd (69.59 FM) later that year. During the August 1991 coup attempt by the GKChP, Europa Plus continued broadcasting without interruption as the station was purely music-oriented and apolitical.

In 1992, during one of the first meetings of the licensing commission under the Russian Ministry of Press and Information, Europa Plus was granted a license for the 106.2 FM frequency in Moscow. In 1993, following the storming of the Ostankino TV Center, Europa Plus established a news department and began airing news broadcasts. That same year, the station received its first national Ovatsiya Award as the best radio station of the year. Additionally, on March 1, Europa Plus began broadcasting in Yuzhno-Sakhalinsk on 66.86 VHF and 102.5 FM. On March 1, 1995, Europa Plus expanded to Tula on 69.02 VHF and 104.9 FM. On November 21, 1998, Europa Plus launched its own chart show, EuroHit Top 40, airing Saturdays from 16:00 to 18:00. Starting in 2015, the show moved to Fridays from 14:00 to 16:00 Moscow time. The program has been hosted by Alexei Manuylov since its inception.

In February 2004, Europe Plus France, part of the Lagardère Group, became the sole owner of ZAO Europa Plus. The station broadcasts reached around 1046 daily listeners, at 5th position among Russian radio stations. and on the Intersputnik Express 6 and Intelsat 904 satellites.

On February 28, 2015, the station premiered its flagship dance chart show, Top Club Chart, airing Saturdays from 20:00 to 22:00. The show is hosted by Timur Bodrov. On March 13, 2015, Europa Plus began broadcasting from the most technologically advanced studio in Europe, the Visual-STUDIO Europa Plus. On February 1, 2015, the Europa Plus trademark was recognized as well-known in the Russian Federation, and on December 7, 2015, it was added to the List of Well-Known Trademarks in Russia under number 159.

On July 29, 2019, Europa Plus became the third Russian radio station to begin broadcasting in the DRM+ digital format (Saint Petersburg, 95.7 MHz). On February 7, 2020, Europa Plus entered the Guinness World Records for "the most northern internet broadcast in the history of public radio". Since June 2020, Europa Plus has aired the Summer Vibes block, featuring summer hits from 20:00 to 22:00 Moscow time. In 2023, the program was extended for the first time into autumn, running from July 3 to September 1, 2023.
