= Gazprom-Media =

Russian radio and television conglomerate

- Type: Subsidiary
- Industry: Mass media
- Founded: 1998
- Headquarters: Saint Petersburg, Russia
- Key people: Aleksandr Zharov, CEO; Alexey Miller, Chairman
- Revenue: $126 million (2017)
- Operating income: $9.13 million (Į)
- Net income: $11 million (2017)
- Total assets: $75.4 million (2017)
- Total equity: $24.4 million (2017)
- Owner: Gazprom
- Parent: Gazprombank
- Subsidiaries: NTV, NTV Plus, Echo of Moscow, Rutube, Tribuna (Russian newspaper), GPM-Radio
- Website: www.gazprom-media.com

Gazprom-Media (Russian: ОАО Газпром-Медиа) is a Russian media holding company established in January 1998 as a subsidiary of Gazprom Media Holdings. It and its parent company are subsidiaries of Gazprom, a large Russian oil and gas company founded in 1989 that is majority owned by the Federal Government of Russia which owns a 50.23% controlling stake in Gazprom. The group owns more than 38 television channels and 10 radio stations.

== History ==
In 2000, under pressure from Mikhail Lesin, Gazprom-Media acquired NTV, the only nationwide television channel independent of the government at the time, as well as other media assets of Vladimir Gusinsky's Media Most group – including the satellite operator NTV Plus, TNT, the radio station Echo of Moscow, and the Seven Days publishing house – which resulted in major controversy and considerable changes to the channel's editorial policy.

After taking over Media Most in 2000, Gazprom-Media received assets and personnel from Filipp Bobkov's dissolved Fifth Chief Directorate of the KGB, (Note: The Fifth Chief Directorate was responsible for disinformation, control of dissidents, religious groups, and executions.) including its thousands of employees, its database, and the security service founded by Bobkov that had been accused of attempting to assassinate Boris Berezovsky in 1994. The directorate's entire archive had been taken to Media Most. In 2000, Bobkov created the Institute of Strategic Studies and Analysis (ISSA), a joint stock company. It was led by Vaqif Hüseynov, the former head of the KGB in Azerbaijan, and operated as a think tank and successor to Media Most's security department. Vladimir Zhizhin chaired the ISSA's board of directors from 2001 to 2002. (Note: Zhinzhin was close to Arne Treholt.)

In 2005, Gazprom-Media purchased Izvestia, a national daily newspaper. In May 2008, the National Media Group bought a 50.19% stake in Izvestia from Gazprom-Media. (Note: National Media Group was founded in February 2008. Investors include Severstal with a 26% stake as of 2009, Rossiya Bank with a 35.5% stake at the end of 2012, SOGAZ with a 21.22% stake as of 2015, and Surgutneftegas with a 23.98% stake as of 30 March 2016. Since 2014, the National Media Group has been chaired by Alina Kabaeva, who has a strong relationship with Vladimir Putin.)

In August 2005, Gazprom-Media Holdings was sold to Gazprombank for 37.22 billion rubles. In 2012, Gazprombank's ownership was split between Gazprom with a 41.73% stake and NPF Gazfond with a 46.92% stake. Most of Gazfond's stake was managed by the financial company Lider. As a part of the SOGAZ insurance company, Lider had been controlled by Rossiya Bank, whose largest shareholder was Yuri Kovalchuk, an associate of Vladimir Putin. In March 2014, Rossiya Bank sold its indirect control of Lider to Gazfond, which now owns a 45% stake in Lider. Since 2003, Gazfond's president has been Yuri Shamalov, who is also the deputy chairman of Gazprombank.

== Media assets ==
=== Television ===
- 2×2
- 365 Days TV
- Pyatnitsa!
- Match!
- NTV
- NTV Plus
- TNT
- TNT4
- TV-3
- Subbota!

=== GPM-Radio ===
GPM Radio (Gazprom-Media Radio) is Russia's largest private radio group. The company operates a vast network of nationwide stations that collectively reach an audience of over 39 million listeners per month. The Radio company is managed operationally by Vadim Tereshchuk (General Director) and Yuri Kostin (President).

GPM Radio brings together nine distinct radio brands that cover almost all key target audiences in the Russian market:

- AvtoRadio, the flagship station
- Radio Energy NRG, started as Franchise of France based NRJ group, Gazprom canceled the connection. The station is proramming club, dance and chart-music.
- Yumor FM, a program which mixes pop-music with jokes.
- Comedy Radio
- Detskoe Radio, nationwide children-program
- Like FM
- Relax FM, ambient-music
- Radio Romantika (Moscow 98.8 FM, formerly nationwide), aiming womean with soft-pop
- Radio Zenit (Saint Petersburg 89.7 FM, joint venture with FC Zenit, which is also sponsored by Gazprom)

=== Paper publications ===
- Seven Days Publishing House
  - Seven Days (TV guide)
  - Story Caravan (monthly magazine)
  - Story Caravan Collection (monthly magazine)

=== Internet ===
- Rutube
- Вокруг ТВ
  - SRSLY
- Sportbox.ru
- УМА-ТЕХ
- Premier
- Getintent
- 2x2.Медиа

=== Movie and cinema ===
- Central Partnership
- Comedy Club Production
- Red Media
- NTV-Kino
- October Cinema & Crystal Palace Cinema

== Directors general ==
- Viktor Ilyushin (December 1997 – June 1998)
- Sergey Zverev (June 1998 – May 1999)
- Alexander Astafyev (1999 – 2000)
- Alfred Kokh (June 2000 – October 2001)
- Boris Jordan (October 2001 – January 2003)
- Alexander Dybal (January 2003 – June 2004)
- Nikolay Senkevich (since July 2004)
- Aleksandr Zharov (since March 2020)

== Board of directors ==
- Alexey Miller (chairman)
- Aleksandr Zharov
- Yuri Shamalov
- Alaxey Matveev
- Sergey Kupriyanov
- Sergey Kuznets

== Management ==
- Aleksandr Zharov (CEO, Member of the Board of Directors)
- Svetlana Fefilova (Deputy CEO)
- Yulia Golubeva (Deputy CEO)
- Tina Kandelaki (Deputy CEO)

== See also ==
- Mass media in Russia
- Michael R. Caputo
