= AvtoRadio =

Russian radio station

AvtoRadio (Russian: Авторадио) is a Moscow-based radio station. The station plays songs in Russian and English. A variety of music from different genres.

== History ==
It broadcasts music and information. It started broadcasting on 5 April 1993 and is part of Gazprom Media Radio, formerly VKPM Media Group (Veshchatelnaya Korporatsiya Prof-Media, a division of Interros).

It broadcasts to Moscow and Moscow region on 90.3 MHz FM, across Russia (there are three regional variants), Armenia, Latvia, and worldwide via the internet.

According to VKPM, in April 2006 the average daily number of listeners was 1,097,000, or 11.6% of the total number of listeners in Moscow and Moscow Region.

Avtoradio announced to broadcast from within Vancouver, Canada during the 2010 Winter Olympic Games, the first time in history that a Russian radio station would be broadcasting from Canada.

== Format ==
From the moment of the radio station's creation, its musical formats initially included Russian-language and foreign pop music of various genres (pop, rock, urban chanson, and dance-pop) spanning from the 1970s to the present day. The ratio of Russian to foreign music was 65/35.

Later, Avtoradio began altering its music format. During each hour of programming, the station reduced the airtime for rock, urban chanson, dance-pop, and foreign songs, shifting its focus toward modern Russian-language pop music. By this point, only four foreign songs were played per hour: at the 12th and 42nd minutes (80s and 90s hits) and at the 27th and 57th minutes (contemporary hits from the 2000s to the present). The ratio of Russian to foreign music became 80/20.

Starting April 1, 2017, Avtoradio further reduced the number of foreign hits to just two songs per hour, completely eliminating contemporary foreign hits from regular programming. The ratio shifted to 90/10 in favor of Russian music. However, modern foreign hits continued to air during the morning show Poehali ("Let's Go") and the evening show Murzilki LIVE. Additionally, foreign songs accounted for up to 50% of the content in the special project Disco 80s. On May 27, 2021, Avtoradio reintroduced contemporary foreign hits at the end of every hour.

From April 1, 2022, Avtoradio added contemporary foreign hits at the 27th and 58th minutes of each hour. 80s–90s hits began airing at the 11th and 41st minutes. Occasionally, tracks from the 2000–2022 period are played at the 41st minute, while 80s–90s tracks sometimes appear at the 58th minute.

== Awards ==
Certificate of Honor from the Moscow City Duma (June 18, 2003) — for contributions to the city community.

Avtoradio is a laureate of the international professional award NAB 2005 International Broadcasting Excellence Award, a multiple winner of the Radiomania award in various categories, a champion of the All-Russian Advertising Professionals Competition PROFI, a three-time recipient of the honorary Brand of the Year award, a laureate of the ZD AWARDS by the newspaper Moskovsky Komsomolets, the National Russian Music Award Ovation, the Russian National Olympus Award, the Moscow International Advertising Festival Golden Apple, and others.

=== Ratings ===
According to the Brand Media agency’s 2015 ratings, Avtoradio ranked 1st in Moscow and held a 6.2% audience share nationwide.

== See also ==
- Euro disco
- Italo disco
- Interros (parent company)
- Serhiy Kurchenko
