= Hit FM (Russia) =

Radio station

Хит FM / Hit FM
- Country: Russia and Kyrgyzstan
- License area: Moscow
- Headquarters: Moscow, Russia
- Branding: Хит FM / Hit FM

Programming
- Language(s): Russian
- Format: contemporary hit radio

Ownership
- Owner: Russian Media Group (Русская Медиагруппа) (Radio-Art JSC)
- Parent: Capital Investments JSC; BIZ Enterprises (until 2004)
- Sister stations: DFM; Radio Maximum; Radio Monte Carlo Russia; Russkoye Radio

History
- Founded: May 30, 1997 by Boris Zosimov
- Launch date: May 30, 1997; 28 years ago

Coverage
- Stations: 107.4 MHz (Moscow)

Links
- Webcast: http://www.hitfm.ru
- Website: http://www.hitfm.ru

Hit FM (in Russian: Хит FM) is a private radio station chain in Russia founded on 30 May 1997 by former Universal Music Russia president Boris Zosimov. It is currently owned by "Russkaia Mediagrouppa" holding (Русская Медиагруппа).

Initially it started with broadcasts to the Moscow region on 107.4 FM, it now covers around 600 of the big Russian cities, as well as online and satellite (via Eutelsat W7 and Tricolor TV). It also has stations in Transnistria and Kyrgyzstan.

Hit FM broadcasts mainly contemporary hits (rock, RnB, electronic music).

== See also ==
- For comprehensive listings of frequencies: Hit FM (Russian Wikipedia)
