= Russkoye Radio =

Russian radio station

Русское радио / Russkoye Radio
- Country: Russia, Armenia, Belarus, Cyprus, Kazakhstan and others
- License area: Moscow
- Headquarters: Moscow, Russia
- Branding: Русское радио / Russkoye Radio

Programming
- Language(s): Russian
- Format: Russian Hot AC

Ownership
- Owner: state company Russian Media Group (Русская Медиагруппа) (Russkoye Radio - Eurasia JSC)
- Parent: Capital Investments JSC
- Sister stations: DFM, Hit FM, Radio Maximum, Radio Monte Carlo Russia

History
- Founded: August 2, 1995; 31 years ago by Sergey Arkhipov, Sergey Kozhevnikov and Vitaly Bogdanov
- Launch date: August 2, 1995; 31 years ago

Coverage
- Stations: 105.7 MHz (Moscow); 107.8 MHz (Saint Petersburg); 104.9 MHz (Yerevan)

Links
- Webcast: http://www.rusradio.ru
- Website: http://www.rusradio.ru

Russkoye Radio (Russian: Русское радио, in English: Russian Radio) is a Russian radio station, broadcasting in some CIS countries. It differs from other similar stations since it broadcasts songs almost exclusively in Russian.

== History ==
In Moscow Russkoye Radio began broadcasting on 2 August 1995.

In 1996, Russkoye Radio established the folk music award Golden Gramophone, which takes place at the end of each year in the Kremlin in Moscow and a similar ceremony takes place at the Ice Palace in St. Petersburg.

During its initial summer test phase (until late 1995), the station aired music-only programming from 08:00 to 22:00 without jingles, with silent gaps lasting 5–20 seconds between songs. Commercial advertising was introduced in 1996. Each ad break concluded with humorous segments voiced by Nikolai Fomenko (until 2009), Vadim Galygin (2009–2012), Dmitry Nagiyev (December 20, 2012 – March 22, 2024), and Anton Yuryev (since April 1, 2024).

The ceremony has been held at various Moscow venues: the State Kremlin Palace (1996–2014, 2017–2022), Olimpiysky Arena (2015–2016), Crocus City Hall (2023), and VTB Arena (since 2024). Parallel events take place at Saint Petersburg's Ice Palace and Minsk Arena in Belarus. A television counterpart, RU.TV, launched in 2006.

The station's first program director, Stepan Stroyev, served until 1999. Subsequent directors included Alexander Karlov (2000–2003), Marcel González (2003–2007), Roman Yemelyanov (2007–2015), Olesya Volkova (2016–2021), and Vladimir Borisov (since 2022).

Programming

The weekly music chart Russkaya Gorka debuted in 1996, hosted by Gleb Deev and airing Saturdays at 21:00 with 12 top songs. Expanded to 20 tracks in February 1999 and renamed Golden Gramophone, the show aired Saturdays from 12:00 to 14:00. Hosts later included Boris Korablyov (2000–2001), Andrey Chizhov (2001–2002), Alexander Karlov (2002–2005), Alla Dovlatova and Andrey Malakhov (2005–2007), Roman Yemelyanov (2007–2015), and Ivan Suvorov (September–November 2015).

Records and Expansion

On September 22, 2010, Russkoye Radio entered the Guinness World Records for a 52-hour non-stop show, Russkie Pertsy, hosted by Vadim Voronov, Alisa Seleznyova, and Sergey Melnikov. A second record followed on April 3, 2015, for the longest team radio show (60 hours), featuring Dmitry Olenin replacing Melnikov due to personal reasons.

In 2012, the station introduced themed online streams: Russkoye Kino (soundtracks from Soviet/Russian films) and Golden Gramophone (award-winning hits). A user-customizable playlist feature was discontinued in December 2014, replaced by new channels: Vysotsky (Vladimir Vysotsky's music), Russky Rok (Russian rock), Bessmertny Polk (wartime songs, replacing Russky Shanson in 2015), Hip-Hop, and Detsky (children's music and stories). A standalone Skazki (fairytales) channel was later added.

Controversy

On June 26, 2014, program director Roman Yemelyanov terminated the partnership with Russkoye Radio – Ukraine (broadcasting in 37 cities) after the Ukrainian branch donated 10% of ad revenue (250,000 hryvnias) to the Kyiv Rus territorial defense battalion amid the Donbas conflict. Yemelyanov suggested the campaign, titled Protect the Army – It Will Protect You, targeted the station's branding due to its “Russian” name.

Also, Russkoye Radio was broadcast in Ukraine from 2001 to 2022 under the name Russkoye Radio Ukraina (Ukrainian: Русское Радио Україна). In February 2022, Russkoye Radio Ukraina stopped broadcasting due to the Russian invasion of Ukraine and was replaced with Radio Bayraktar (Ukrainian: Радіо Байрактар).
