= Radio Maximum =

Russian radio station

- Russia
- Broadcast area: Russia
- Frequency: 103.7 MHz in Moscow

Programming
- Format: Contemporary hit radio

Ownership
- Owner: Russian Media Group; (Radio Maximum CJSC)
- Sister stations: DFM; Hit FM; Radio Monte Carlo Russia; Russkoye Radio

History
- First air date: December 25, 1991

Links
- Website: maximum.ru

Radio Maximum is a Russian radio station, specializing in pop and rock music.

Founded in 1991 as a joint venture of Westwood One, Harris Corporation, StoryFirst Communications, and The Moscow News weekly, Maximum is currently owned and operated by Russian Media Group (Russkaya Mediagruppa - RMG). It started broadcasting in Moscow on December 25, 1991 on the frequency of 103.7 MHz. Broadcasting in St. Petersburg commenced in early 1993. The radio station was among the first Russian music stations to start round the clock broadcasting in 1994.

Radio Maximum's format is broad, and includes both western and Russian rock and pop music.

The station is popular, with a successful morning show, which at different times was hosted by such celebrities as Olga Maximova, Kostya Mikhalov, Gennady Bachinsky and Sergey Stillavin.

Radio Maximum is also known for the Maxidrom rock festival, which used to be held every May in Moscow, Russia.
