= Maria Makeeva =

Russian and German journalist and writer

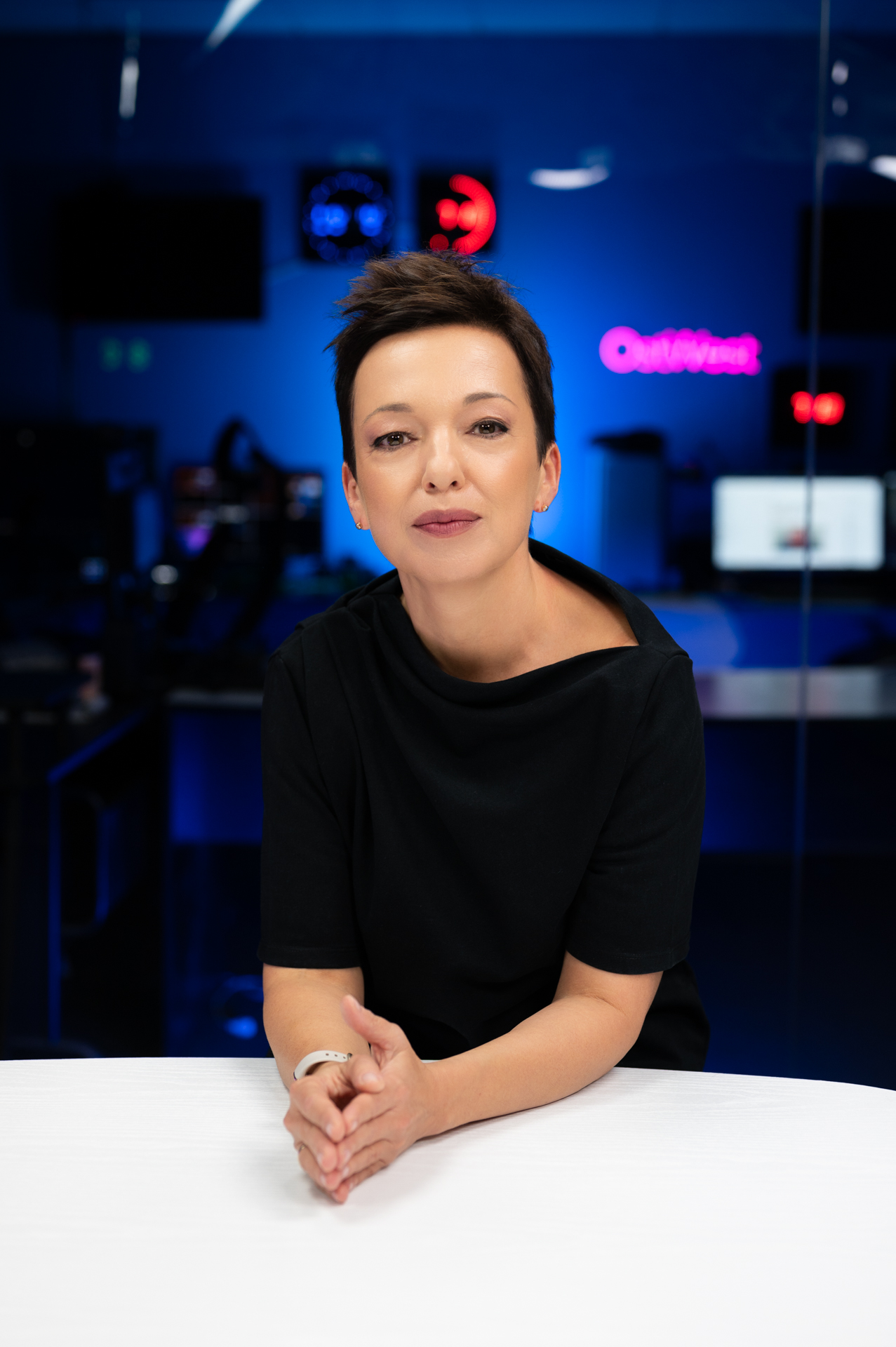
- Born: Maria Igorevna Makeeva; 25 August 1974 (age 52); Moscow, Russian SFSR, Soviet Union
- Citizenship: Soviet Union → Russia
- Education: Russian State University for the Humanities
- Occupations: Journalist, writer, radio and television presenter, media manager
- Years active: 1991–present
- Spouses: Leonid Ragozin (m. 1999; div. 2018) Alexei Kozlov (m. 2021)

Maria Igorevna Makeeva (Russian: Мария Игоревна Макеева) is a Russian and German journalist, writer, radio and television presenter. She previously served as the deputy editor-in-chief of the Russian independent channel TV Rain and as the editor-in-chief of the Berlin-based German Russian-language TV channel OstWest.

== Biography ==
Maria Makeeva was born on 25 August 1974 in Moscow. She attended School No. 630 in Moscow, later transferring to School No. 538 in Polyanka to study in a humanities class affiliated with the Russian State University for the Humanities (RSUH). In 1996, she graduated from RSUH with a degree in museology and art history. For her thesis, she studied the Kolomenskoye Museum-Reserve, where she briefly worked as a tour guide.

Makeeva began working in the media at age 16, starting with an internship in 1991 in the Alyy parus youth section of Komsomolskaya Pravda. She speaks English, Spanish, and German, and has studied Latvian.

Following the annexation of Crimea in 2014, Makeeva began spending significant time in Riga, Latvia, living between two countries for three years while managing her media career, before permanently relocating to Berlin, Germany, in 2017.

== Career ==
=== Russian radio and television ===
In October 1995, Makeeva began her career as a news presenter at Russkoye Radio, one of the first commercial radio stations in Russia. She also hosted programs such as Lyudyam o Lyudyakh (People to People), Russkiye kanikuly (Russian Vacations), and Chitalka (Reader). By 2005, she hosted the morning talk show Pogovorim (Let's Talk) on Russian News Service. She left the company in 2007, serving at the time as both the host of the daily morning news show and deputy general director of the Russian News Service.

From 2007 to 2010, she worked at Silver Rain Radio, hosting the daily evening news show Sobytiye dnya (Event of the Day) and Delovaya Sreda (Business Environment), a weekly business interview show produced in collaboration with Kommersant.

In 2010, she joined the independent television channel TV Rain as deputy editor-in-chief and TV presenter. At TV Rain, she anchored the daily news and hosted special broadcasts covering elections, the 2011–2013 Russian protests, the trials of Pussy Riot and Alexei Navalny. She also interviewed prominent guests, including then-Russian President Dmitry Medvedev.

Makeeva was TV Rain's special correspondent during the 2012 United States presidential election. She hosted the political show MAKEEVA and produced the youth-oriented reality show President-2042. In late 2015, she was appointed director of TV Rain's news department and temporarily fulfilled the duties of editor-in-chief after Mikhail Zygar stepped down. She held this position until her departure from the channel in July 2016.

=== Germany and OstWest TV ===
In 2017, Makeeva moved to Berlin and became the editor-in-chief of RTVD, a local Russian-language television channel. She initiated a major rebranding of the station, renaming it to OstWest. Under her leadership, the station launched dozens of new projects, including the weekly news and analysis program East-West. The Week (Восток-Запад. Неделя). Makeeva also produced several documentary series and films for the channel, including Am I crazy? (Я псих?), a series about mental health during the COVID-19 pandemic; The Family from Mirnyy (Семья из Мирного), centering on environmental activists; and the 2023 documentary Save and Be Saved (Спасись и сохранись), co-produced with her husband Alexei Kozlov and Aleksandra Perepelova.

In late 2023, she released an interview cycle on the channel titled What's wrong with the 90s? (Что не так с 90-ми?) shortly before stepping down as editor-in-chief later that year.

In 2022, the OstWest team received the Special Prize (Förderpreis) from the German National Foundation (Deutsche Nationalstiftung), with the jury citing the channel's contribution to defending democracy and countering propaganda. Later that year, OstWest TV was awarded the special prize at the Hanns Joachim Friedrichs Award for excellence in television journalism.

=== Literary career ===
In 2024, Makeeva made her debut as a novelist with the fantasy thriller Bear Ears. Amber Man (Медвежьи уши. Янтарный человек), published by Jūra&Laiki under the Vidim Books imprint. The book, described by her as a "novel of dreams," was illustrated by Latvian artist Ilona Gansovska and drew heavily from her years spending time in Latvia.

== Personal life ==
From 1999 to 2018, Makeeva was married to international journalist Leonid Ragozin. In 2021, she married Russian businessman and human rights advocate Alexei Kozlov.
