= Bibliography of Russia during World War I =

This is a select bibliography of post-World War II English language books (including translations) and journal articles about the Russia during the First World War, the period leading up to the war, and the immediate aftermath. For works on the Russian Revolution, please see Bibliography of the Russian Revolution and Civil War.

Works listed here are cited in the notes or bibliographies of scholarly sources. Each is published by an academic or major press, written by a recognized expert, or substantially reviewed in scholarly journals; borderline cases are omitted. A selection of primary sources are included. Many of the books below carry their own bibliographies; see the Further reading section for other bibliographies, and the External links section for historical sites, academic sites, and museums.

Citations follow APA style. (Note: Entries are in plain text APA 7 format without templates; templates are used only for reviews and notes.) Book have citations to academic journal or mainstream published reviews when available. For books only partly about the subject, relevant chapter or section titles are provided when useful and available. Translators of the original-language edition are included when possible. In cases where a title or name has appeared with more than one English spelling, the most recent published form is used and a footnote documents any earlier title under which the work appeared.

== General history of World War I ==
- Emmerson, C. (2019). Crucible: The Long End of the Great War and the Birth of a New World, 1917–1924. New York: PublicAffairs.
- Hart, P. (2013). The Great War: A Combat History of the First World War. New York: Oxford University Press.
- Keegan, J. (2000). The First World War. New York: Vintage.
- Leonhard, J. & Camiller, P. (2018). Pandora's Box: A History of the First World War. Cambridge, MA: Harvard University Press.
- Goldstein, E. (2013). The First World War Peace Settlements, 1919–1925. London: Routledge.
- Meyer, G. J. (2006). A World Undone: The Story of the Great War 1914 to 1918. Random House.
- Stevenson, D. (2005). Cataclysm: The First World War as Political Tragedy. New York: Basic Books.

== General history of Russia and World War I ==
- Gatrell, P. (2015). Tsarist Russia at War: The View from Above, 1914–February 1917. The Journal of Modern History, 87(3), 668–700.

=== Background ===
- Clark, C. M. (2013). The Sleepwalkers: How Europe Went to War in 1914. New York, NY: Harper.
- Dowler, W. (2010). Russia in 1913. DeKalb: DeKalb: Northern Illinois University Press.
- Emmerson, C. (2013). 1913: In Search of the World Before the Great War. New York: PublicAffairs.
- Lieven, D. (1983). Russia and the Origins of the First World War. London, UK: Palgrave Macmillan.
- ———. (2016). The End of Tsarist Russia: The March to World War I and Revolution. New York: Penguin Books. (Note: Originally published outside the United States under the title Towards the Flame: Empire, War and the End of Tsarist Russia.)
- McMeekin, S. (2013). The Russian Origins of the First World War. Cambridge, MA: Harvard University Press.

=== Domestic Russian history ===
- Bushnell, J. (2017). Russian Peasants and Soldiers during World War I: Home and Front Interacting. Russian Studies in History, 56(2), pp. 65–72.
- Gatrell, P. (1999). A Whole Empire Walking: Refugees in Russia during World War I. Bloomington: Indiana University Press.
- Gatrell, P. (2005). Russia’s First World War: A Social and Economic History. Harlow, UK: Pearson-Longman.
- Kenez, P. (1972). Changes in the Social Composition of the Officer Corps during World War I. The Russian Review, 31(4), pp. 369–375.
- Lohr, E. (2003). Nationalizing the Russian Empire: The Campaign Against Enemy Aliens During World War I. Cambridge, MA: Harvard University Press.
- Sanborn, J. A. (2005). Unsettling the Empire: Violent Migrations and Social Disaster in Russia during World War I. The Journal of Modern History, 77(2), pp. 290–324.
- Sanborn, J. A. (2003). Drafting the Russian Nation: Military Conscription, Total War, and Mass Politics, 1905–1925. DeKalb, IL: Northern Illinois University Press.

=== The Russian Empire ===
- Reynolds, M. A. (2011). Shattering Empires: The Clash and Collapse of the Ottoman and Russian Empires 1908–1918. Cambridge, UK: Cambridge University Press.
- Smele, J. (2016). The “Russian” Civil Wars, 1916-1926: Ten Years That Shook the World. New York, NY: Oxford University Press.
- Staliūnas, D., & Aoshima, Y., (eds.). (2021). The Tsar, the Empire, and the Nation: Dilemmas of Nationalization in Russia's Western Borderlands, 1905–1915. Historical Studies in Eastern Europe and Eurasia. Budapest: Central European University Press.
- Steinberg, J. W. (2014). Imperial Apocalypse: The Great War and the Destruction of the Russian Empire. New York, NY: Oxford University Press.
- Zygar, M. (2017). The Empire Must Die: Russia's Revolutionary Collapse, 1900-1917. New York, NY: PublicAffairs.

=== Related to the Russian Revolution ===
- Buzinkai, D. (1967). The Bolsheviks, the League of Nations and the Paris Peace Conference, 1919. Soviet Studies, 19(2), pp. 257–263.
- Engelstein, L. (2017). Russia in Flames: War, Revolution, Civil War, 1914-1921. New York, NY: Oxford University Press.
- Heenan, L. E. (1987). Russian Democracy's Fatal Blunder: The Summer Offensive of 1917. New York, NY: Praeger.
- Krammer, A. (1983). Soviet Propaganda among German and Austro-Hungarian Prisoners of War in Russia, 1917–1921. In Richardson, S. R. & Pastor, P (Eds.). Essays on World War I: Origins and Prisoners of War. (pp. 249–64). New York, NY: Brooklyn College Press, 1983.
- Lieven, D. (2016). The End of Tsarist Russia: The March to World War I and Revolution. New York, NY: Penguin Books.
- Lincoln, W. B. (1986). Passage Through Armageddon: The Russians in War and Revolution, 1914-1918. New York, NY: Simon and Schuster.
- Morrison, A., Drieu, C., & Chokobaeva, A. (Eds.). (2020). The Central Asian Revolt of 1916: A Collapsing Empire in the Age of War and Revolution. Manchester: Manchester University Press.
- Nation, R. C. (2009). War on War: Lenin, the Zimmerwald Left, and the Origins of Communist Internationalism. Chicago, IL: Haymarket Books.
- Read, C. (2013). War and Revolution in Russia, 1914–22. London, UK: Macmillan.
- Smith, S. A. (2017). Russia in Revolution: An Empire in Crisis, 1890 to 1928. New York, NY: Oxford University Press.

== Military history ==
- Buttar, P. (2014). Collision of Empires: The War on the Eastern Front in 1914. Oxford: Osprey Publishing.
- ——— (2017). Germany Ascendant: The Eastern Front 1915. Oxford: Osprey Publishing.
- ——— (2017). Russia's Last Gasp: The Eastern Front 1916–17. Oxford: Osprey Publishing.
- ——— (2019). The Splintered Empires: The Eastern Front 1917–21. Oxford: Osprey Publishing.
- Dowling, T. C. (2009). The Brusilov Offensive. Bloomington, IN: Indiana University Press. (Note: See Brusilov Offensive.)
- Marshall, A. (2004). Russian Military Intelligence, 1905–1917: The Untold Story behind Tsarist Russia in the First World War. War in History, 11(4), pp. 393–423.
- Neiberg, M. S. & Jordan, D. (2012). The Eastern Front 1914-1920: From Tannenberg to the Russo-Polish War. London, UK: Amber Books.
- Sanborn, J. A. (2003). Drafting the Russian Nation: Military Conscription, Total War, and Mass Politics, 1905–1925. DeKalb, IL: Northern Illinois University Press.
- Steinberg, J. W. (2010). All the Tsar's Men: Russia's General Staff and the Fate of Empire, 1898-1914. Baltimore, MD: Johns Hopkins University Press.
- Stoff, L. S. (2006). They Fought for the Motherland: Russia's Women Soldiers in World War I and the Revolution. Lawrence, KS: University Press of Kansas.
- Stone, D. R. (2015). The Russian Army in the Great War: The Eastern Front, 1914-1917. Lawrence, KS: University Press of Kansas.
- Stone, N. (1998). The Eastern Front, 1914–1917. New York, NY: Penguin Books.
- Wildman, A. K. (1980, 1987). The End of the Russian Imperial Army (2 vols.). Princeton, NJ: Princeton University Press.

== Topical ==
=== Industry and labor ===
- Engel, B. A. (1997). Not by Bread Alone: Subsistence Riots in Russia during World War I. The Journal of Modern History, 69(4), 696–721.
- Siegelbaum, L. H. (1978). Moscow Industrialists and the War-Industries Committees During World War I. Russian History, 5(1), 64–83.

=== Agriculture and the peasantry ===
- Seregny, S. J. (2000). Peasants, Nation, and Local Government in Wartime Russia. Slavic Review, 59(2), 336–342.
- Seregny, S. J. (2000). Zemstvos, Peasants, and Citizenship: The Russian Adult Education Movement and World War I. Slavic Review, 59(2), 290–315.

== Other works ==
- David-Fox, M., Holquist, P., & Martin, A. M. (2012). Fascination and Enmity: Russia and Germany as entangled histories, 1914-1945. Pittsburgh, PA: University of Pittsburgh Press.
- Hartley, J. M. (2021). Chapter 13:The Volga in War, Revolution and Civil War. In The Volga: A History. New Haven: Yale University Press.
- Pschichholz, C. (Ed.). (2020). The First World War as a Caesura? Demographic Concepts, Population Policy, and Genocide in the Late Ottoman, Russian, and Habsburg Spheres. Berlin: Duncker and Humblot.

== Historiography and memory studies ==
- Kobiałka, D., Kostyrko, M., & Kajda, K. (2017). The Great War and Its Landscapes Between Memory and Oblivion: The Case of Prisoners of War Camps in Tuchola and Czersk, Poland. International Journal of Historical Archaeology, 21(1), 134–151.

== See also ==
- Bibliography of the Russian Revolution and Civil War
