= Republic.ru =

Russian analytical online magazine

Republic
- Website type: Magazine
- Available in: Russian language
- Predecessor: Slon.ru
- Country of origin: Russia
- Owner: Moscow Digital Media
- Founder: Leonid Bershidsky
- Editor: Zinaida Pronchenko
- Key people: Natalya Sindeyeva, Dmitry Kolezev
- Employees: 42 (as of 2014)
- Parent: Moscow Digital Media
- Website: republicmag.io
- Commercial: Yes
- Registration: Optional
- Launched: May 18, 2009; 17 years ago
- Current status: Active

Republic (previously known as Slon or Slon.ru) is a Russian analytical online magazine that mainly covers politics, business and economics. It is published by the Moscow Digital Media private limited company.

== History ==
=== Slon ===
The Slon.ru website was launched on 18 May 2009. The website's name Slon (Russian: Слон, lit. 'Elephant') is a reference to the blind men and an elephant parable, in which blind people disagreed about what the elephant looked like. Slon authors stated that its mission is to show "the whole elephant" to its readers. The website mainly publishes materials about politics, economics and business.

The first editor-in-chief and executive director of Slon.ru was the Russian journalist and publisher Leonid Bershidsky. Among the first employees of Slon.ru were Russian journalists Alexander Gordeev, Olga Romanova, former deputy editor-in-chief of SmartMoney magazine Yuri Granovsky and former editor-in-chief of Russky Newsweek magazine Dmitry Kuznets. The main shareholders are Russian media managers Natalya Sindeyeva and Alexander Vinokurov.

In 2010, the website changed its format; the main goal was to move towards the creation of an expert platform. The move was inspired by the concept of the Slate online magazine. On 18 February 2011, Bershidsky announced that he had left Slon. Since the summer of 2014, the website has been working on a paid subscription basis.

=== Republic ===
On 6 November 2016, it was announced that the website had changed its name to Republic. The change also included a new design and three additional sections; the sphere of interest of the magazine has expanded to the topics of science and technology. In August 2016, Irina Malkova, a Russian journalist and former deputy editor-in-chief of RBC, became the editor-in-chief of the magazine. In 2018, Republic was transformed into a platform for a group of online magazines.

In June 2021, Russian journalist Dmitry Kolezev became the chief editor. On 15 October 2021, Moscow Digital Media was labelled as a 'foreign agent' in Russia. In response, Kolezev said that he did not know why the Russian authorities decided to do it. He also said that Republic does not have foreign financing: "... it only exists thanks to subscribers' money".

=== Awards ===
In 2010, the website won first place in the Information Site of the Year category in the ROTOP (Russian Online TOP) competition.

In 2010, the Butyrka-blog diary published on the Slon.ru website won the online voting in the Best Blog nomination in The Best of Blogs (BOBs) competition.

In January 2017, Republic journalist Siranush Sharoyan received the Redkollegia media award for her article "Black Cash. How a Trillion Dollars Was Withdrawn from the Country in 25 Years. The History of the Russian Banking System - Based on Criminal Cases".

== Chief editors ==
May 2009-18 February 2011: Leonid Bershidsky

March 2011-August 2011: Yuri Saprykin

August 2011-October 2014: Andrey Goryanov

November 2014-August 2016: Maxim Kashulinsky

August 2016-July 2017: Irina Malkova

August 2017-October 2018: Maxim Kashulinsky

9 June 2021-April 2025: Dmitry Kolezev

Since April 2025: Zinaida Pronchenko
