= Silver Eye Award =

Czech award for Central and Eastern European documentary films

- Description: Best Central and Eastern European documentary films from the East Silver / East Doc market
- Location: Jihlava (2009–2022); Prague (since 2023)
- Country: Czech Republic
- Presented by: Institute of Documentary Film
- Rewards: Trophy, prize money and a year of festival distribution through East Silver Caravan
- First award: 2009

The Silver Eye Award is an annual award for documentary films from Central and Eastern Europe, presented by the Prague-based Institute of Documentary Film (IDF). It is given to the best films from the East Silver documentary market. From 2009 to 2022 it was presented at the Jihlava International Documentary Film Festival (Ji.hlava IDFF); since 2023 it has been presented in Prague during the East Doc Platform. The award goes to a film's producer rather than its director, and is intended to help the film's promotion and international distribution.

== History ==
The East Silver Market introduced the award in 2009, alongside the 13th Jihlava festival. Films from that year's market were eligible in three categories, short, mid-length and feature-length, and each winner received €1,500. The first winners were announced on October 31, 2009, at the festival's closing ceremony. Winners also received a year of festival distribution through the IDF's East Silver Caravan service.

From 2018 the award was given in two categories: short documentaries (up to 40 minutes) and feature-length documentaries (over 60 minutes), with about 11 films nominated in each. Winners are chosen by international juries of film industry professionals, such as sales agents, distributors and festival programmers. By 2022 each winner received a trophy, €2,500 and a year of East Silver Caravan festival service worth a further €3,500.

Since 2023 the award has been presented in March in Prague, during the East Doc Platform, which the IDF organises with the One World International Human Rights Documentary Film Festival. In 2026 it was awarded to the best project at the rough-cut stage from the East Doc Market, and the winner received a year of festival distribution through the East Doc Caravan.

== Notable nominees ==
Films nominated for the award include F@ck This Job (2021), Vera Krichevskaya's documentary about the Russian independent television channel TV Rain, produced by Mike Lerner and Krichevskaya.

== Winners ==
=== At Ji.hlava (2009–2022) ===
Year	Feature-length	Mid-length	Short	Special mention(s)
2009	Disco and Atomic War (Jaak Kilmi; Estonia, Finland)	Rabbit à la Berlin (Bartek Konopka; Poland, Germany)	Six Weeks (Marcin Janos Krawczyk; Poland)	Sidetrack (Anna Kazejak; mid-length)
2010	At the Edge of Russia (Michał Marczak; Poland)	Family Instinct (Andris Gauja; Latvia)	That's Life (Daniel Zieliński; Poland)	Michael Berger – A Hysteria (Thomas Fürhapter; mid-length)
2011	Solar Eclipse (Martin Mareček; Czech Republic)	Crulic – The Path to Beyond (Anca Damian; Romania, Poland)	I Will Forget This Day (Alina Rudnitskaya; Russia)	
2012	Sofia's Last Ambulance (Ilian Metev; Bulgaria, Croatia)	We Will Be Happy One Day (Paweł Wysoczański; Poland)	Cut-Paste (Rafał Samusik; Poland)	
2013	The 727 Days Without Karamo (Anja Salomonowitz; Austria)	Joanna (Aneta Kopacz; Poland)	Previous Scenes (Aleksandra Maciuszek; Poland, Cuba)	Art of Disappearing (Bartek Konopka, Piotr Rosołowski; mid-length)
2014	Toto and His Sisters (Alexander Nanau; Romania)	Blood (Alina Rudnitskaya; Russia)	The Visit (Matej Bobrik; Poland)	Gottland (feature-length); Euromaidan. Rough Cut (mid-length)
2015	Over the Years (Nikolaus Geyrhalter; Austria)	Casa Blanca (Aleksandra Maciuszek; Poland)	Snails (Grzegorz Szczepaniak; Poland)	Drifter (Gábor Hörcher; feature-length); Prison System 4614 (Jan Soldat; mid-length)
2016	Communion (Anna Zamecka; Poland)	5 October (Martin Kollár; Slovakia)	Pulse (Robin Petré; Hungary, Belgium, Portugal)	My Own Private War (Lidija Zelovic; mid-length)
2017	Sand and Blood (Matthias Krepp; Austria)	Paper Stars (Inna Omelchenko; Russia)	Dust (Jakub Radej; Poland)	
2018	When the War Comes (Jan Gebert; Czech Republic, Croatia)	—N/a	Eight Images from the Life of Nastya Sokolova (Alina Kotova, Vladlena Sandu; Russia)	Lembri Uudu (short)
2019	Transnistra (Anna Eborn; Sweden, Denmark, Belgium)	—N/a	Pripyat Piano (Eliška Cílková; Czech Republic)	The Wind. A Documentary Thriller (Michał Bielawski; feature-length); Waiting for a Miracle (Aljona Surzhikova; short)
2020	A New Shift (Jindřich Andrš; Czech Republic)	—N/a	Son of the Streets (Mohammed Almughanni)	To Feather, to Wither (Hanna Hovitie; short)
2021	Mara (Sasha Kulak)	—N/a	Sounds of Weariness (Taymour Boulos)	Orpheus (Vadim Kostrov; feature-length)
2022	Love Is Not an Orange (Otilia Babara; Belgium, Moldova, France, Netherlands)	—N/a	Avitaminosis (Kateryna Ruzhyna; Ukraine, Czech Republic)	Plai. A Mountain Path (Eva Dzhyshyashvili; feature-length)

=== At the East Doc Platform, Prague (since 2023) ===
Year	Winner	Special mention
2023	We Will Not Fade Away (Alisa Kovalenko; Ukraine)	
2024	Flowers of Ukraine (Adelina Borets; Poland, Ukraine)	The Other One (Marie-Magdalena Kochová)
2025	A Song Without Home (Rati Tsiteladze; Georgia)	What About Petey? (Martin Trabalík)
2026	Inside (Dorota Vlnová; Slovakia, Croatia; short film)	Animals of the East (Anna Ďurišíková, Andrej Kolenčík)

== See also ==
- Jihlava International Documentary Film Festival
