= Kamerton =

Russian award for journalism and human rights

Kamerton Prize
- Native name: Премия «Камертон» имени Анны Политковской
- Description: Outstanding achievements in defending human rights and freedom of speech
- Location: Moscow
- Country: Russia
- Presented by: Novaya Gazeta (since 2020); Union of Journalists of Russia (2013–2019)
- Reward: A 440 Hz tuning fork
- First award: 2013

The Kamerton Prize (Russian: Премия «Камертон» имени Анны Политковской, "tuning fork"), officially the Anna Politkovskaya Kamerton Prize, is an annual Russian award named after Anna Politkovskaya, the Novaya Gazeta journalist murdered in Moscow in 2006. It is awarded for outstanding achievements in defending human rights, for courage and consistency in upholding the principles of freedom of speech, and for honesty, dignity, civic responsibility and human compassion. The prize was established by the Union of Journalists of Russia in 2013; since 2020 its sole founder has been Novaya Gazeta.

== History ==
The idea for the prize came from Georgy Karetnikov, a journalist, musician and friend of Politkovskaya. The secretariat of the Union of Journalists of Russia established it on August 30, 2013, which would have been Politkovskaya's 55th birthday.

From 2013 to 2019 the prize was presented on September 8, the International Day of Journalists' Solidarity, at a charity concert in memory of journalists killed at work, held in the Great Hall of the Moscow Conservatory. In 2017 the pianist Evgeny Kissin performed at the ceremony.

In 2020, at Karetnikov's request and with the agreement of Politkovskaya's children, the prize was re-established as the Russian Kamerton Prize named after Anna Politkovskaya, with Novaya Gazeta as its sole founder. Since then the ceremony has been held on or near August 30, Politkovskaya's birthday.

The prize was traditionally given to journalists. In 2023 it went to non-journalists for the first time: the jailed theatre director Yevgenia Berkovich and playwright Svetlana Petriychuk. In recent years the prize has been awarded in several named categories, alongside special prizes. The prize was presented for the 14th time in August 2026.

== Award ==
The award is a tuning fork tuned to 440 Hz, in a case engraved with the laureate's name.

== Laureates ==
Year	Laureate(s)	Notes
2013	Olga Allenova	Special correspondent, Kommersant; first laureate
2014	Andrei Mironov and Andrea Rocchelli	Awarded posthumously; killed in eastern Ukraine in May 2014
2015	Galina Arapova	Media lawyer, head of the Mass Media Defence Centre
2016	Sergei Rusanov	Journalist from Tyumen
2017	Yulia Latynina and Yevgeny Poddubny	
2018	Kirill Vyshinsky	Editor-in-chief of RIA Novosti Ukraine
2019	Ivan Golunov	Correspondent, Meduza
2020	Elena Kostyuchenko and Yuri Kozyrev	Journalist, Novaya Gazeta, and photographer; presented by Vladimir Spivakov
2021	Natalya Sindeeva, Dmitry Markov, Nikolai Solonovich and the Moscow Virtuosi	Head of TV Rain; photographer; cellist; chamber orchestra conducted by Vladimir Spivakov
2022	Katerina Gordeeva	Journalist and author of the YouTube channel Skazhi Gordeevoy (Tell Gordeeva)
2023	Yevgenia Berkovich and Svetlana Petriychuk	Theatre director and playwright, then in pre-trial detention; first non-journalist laureates
2024	Alexandra Astakhova; Sobesednik; the mothers of Alexei Navalny and Yulia Navalnaya	Astakhova is a photographer who covers political trials
2025	Irina Pankratova (posthumously); Takie Dela; Mediazona, BBC Russian Service and journalists of Novaya Gazeta	Special jury prize to the artist Ekaterina Galaktionova
2026	The Bell; Verstka; Boris Grebenshchikov	Special prize "For saving lives" to John Coale, U.S. special envoy, for talks that freed nearly 500 political prisoners in Belarus

== See also ==
- Anna Politkovskaya
- Novaya Gazeta
