= Mark Ten =

Russian media executive, general director of TV Rain

- Марк Тен
- Born: 22 May 1991 (age 35); Vladivostok, Russian SFSR, Soviet Union
- Education: Moscow State Institute of International Relations (BA, sociology)
- Occupation: Media executive
- Years active: 2010s–present
- Employer: TV Rain
- Known for: CEO of Sports.ru (2019–2022); general director of TV Rain (2024–present)
- Title: General director of TV Rain
- Term: April 2024 – present
- Predecessor: Natalya Sindeyeva

Mark Ten (Russian: Марк Тен; born 22 May 1991) is a Russian media executive who has served as general director of the independent Russian-language television channel TV Rain (Dozhd) since April 2024. He was previously the chief executive of the sports portal Sports.ru from 2019 to 2022. In October 2026 a Moscow court sentenced him in absentia to five years in a penal colony for organising the activities of an "undesirable organisation".

== Early life and education ==
Ten was born in Vladivostok and grew up in Primorsky Krai before moving to European Russia. He entered the Moscow State Institute of International Relations (MGIMO) in 2009 and graduated with a bachelor's degree in sociology.

== Career ==
=== Sports.ru ===
Ten joined Sports.ru without prior media experience and rose to managing director of the publication. In April 2019 co-founder Dmitry Navosha stepped down as general director and Ten succeeded him; Navosha remained in charge of the parent publisher Tribuna Digital. According to Natalya Sindeyeva, during his time at Sports.ru he became both a partner in the company and its general director.

Under Ten, Sports.ru launched a Kazakhstan edition, expanded into documentary production, and put greater emphasis on statistics and mobile apps. In 2021 the company acquired the football sites Bombardir.ru and Gol.ru from Dmitry Terekhin, founder of Nekki. In 2020 Ten was included in Forbes Russia's "30 Under 30" list in the management category. He left the CEO role in December 2022.

=== TV Rain ===
Ten joined TV Rain in 2023, after the channel had relocated to Amsterdam. On 23 April 2024 founder Natalya Sindeyeva announced during a fundraising marathon that Ten would replace her as general director. Sindeyeva said she lacked the physical energy for day-to-day management and that the channel needed to evolve from a family business into a company with normal business processes. She remained majority shareholder and became chair of the board of directors, while Ten became one of the channel's co-owners. On his appointment Ten said the channel's aims were to attract new audiences and expand programming while keeping to its values and international journalistic standards.

In an interview with Meduza shortly after taking office, Ten discussed the channel's operations in Amsterdam, its efforts to generate revenue, and mistakes by management during the 2022 dismissal of presenter Alexei Korostelev. He has said his goal is to bring the channel to break-even and then profitability within two to three years.

=== Prosecution in Russia ===
TV Rain was designated an "undesirable organisation" by Russia's Prosecutor General's Office in July 2023. In September 2026 Ten and Sindeyeva were arrested in absentia. Prosecutors alleged that from April 2024 to September 2026, while outside Russia, Ten organised the channel's activities. On 30 October 2026 a Moscow court convicted him in absentia under Part 3 of Article 284.1 of the Criminal Code of Russia and sentenced him to five years in a general-regime penal colony.

== Personal life ==
Ten lives in the Netherlands.
