= Hadn Dadn =

Russian synth-pop band

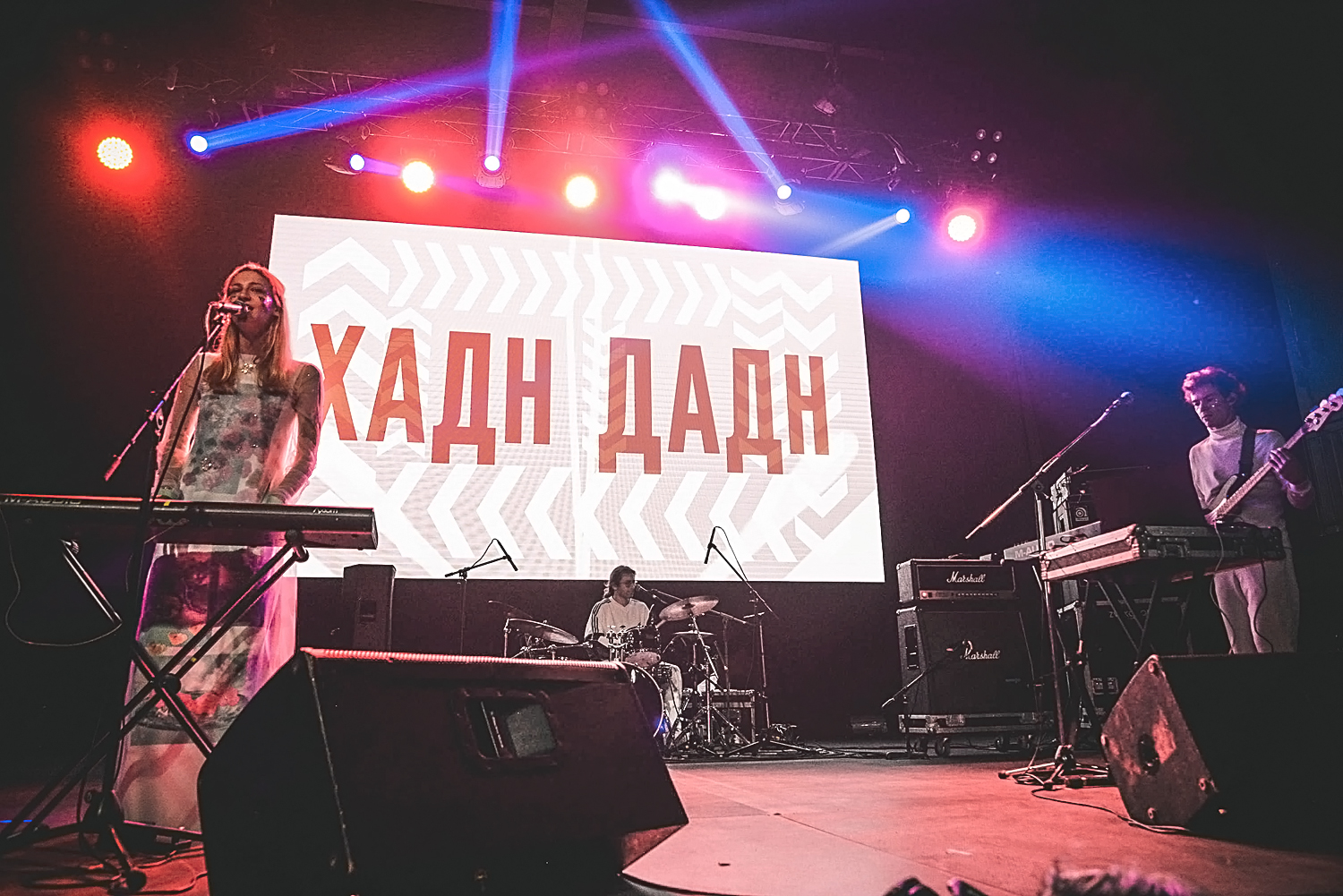

Background information
- Origin: Moscow, Russia
- Genres: synth-pop
- Years active: 2016–present
- Members: Varvara Kraminova; Nikita Chernat; Sergei Kakurkin

Hadn Dadn is a Russian synth-pop band formed in Moscow in 2016.

== History ==
The band's history began with the song "Wait" when amateur video with it was uploaded to VK social network by Varvara Kraminova, future lead singer of the band. Initially, it was dedicated to Vladimir Presnyakov.

In 2018, the band's "Secret Album" was included in Sobaka.ru magazine's article "13 Albums of 2018 According to the Authors of Telegram Channels", and in 2019, the album "Lyaoakyn" was included in the article "50 Best Albums of 2019" by Time Out.

In 2020, the Hadn Dadn performed at the Evening Urgant show.

During the COVID-19 pandemic, band's song "We Are at Home Today" gained popularity and became the basis for various flash mobs one of which was organized by the TV Rain. According to the Meduza, the work has become "the unspoken anthem of self-isolation" since the beginning of the pandemic.

== Features of creativity ==
The group's creativity is a combination of synth-pop with folklore motifs.

The Hadn Dadn's music is dedicated to everyday life and "immerses us in the world of familiar objects". The group "opens slightly a window into someone else's head for us, shows the familiar world from an unusual point of view".

The band also pay much attention to creating songs about cities ("Taganrog", "Nakhichevan", "Novosibirsk" etc.), which reflect the Varvara Kraminova's impressions about these places.

== Studio albums ==
Year	Original title	Translated title
2017	Постепенный альбом	Gradual Album
2018	Тайный альбом	Secret Album
2018	Подружки	Girlfriends
2019	Ляоакын	Lyaoakyn
2020	Ностальгия	Nostalgia

== Music videos ==
- Москва (Moscow)
- Мы сегодня дома (We are at home today), animated video
- Звезды на плечах (Stars on the shoulders)
- Храмомама (Khramomama)
- Максим Горький (Maxim Gorky), animated video

== Awards ==
In 2018, the Hadn Dadn received the Jager Music Awards in the Young Blood nomination.
