= Alexei Kozlov =

Alexei Kozlov may refer to:

- Alexei Kozlov (businessman) (born 1974), Russian businessman in the construction sector
- Alexei Kozlov (figure skater) (born 1979), Estonian figure skater
- Aleksei Aleksandrovich Kozlov (1831–1901), Russian philosopher
- Aleksei Kozlov (footballer, born 1975), Russian footballer
- Aleksei Kozlov (footballer, born 1986), Russian footballer
- Aleksei Kozlov (footballer, born 1999), Russian footballer
- Aleksei Kozlov (musician) (1935–2026), Russian saxophonist
- Alyaksey Kazlow (born 1989), Belarusian footballer
- Alexey Kozlov (intelligence officer) (1934–2015), Russian intelligence officer
