= Mikhail Fishman =

Russian journalist (born 1972)

- Михаил Фишман
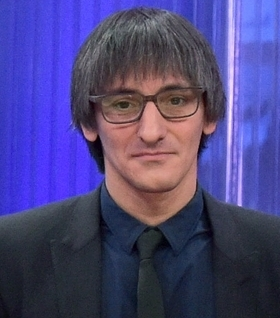
- Fishman in 2016
- Born: 3 December 1972 (age 53); Moscow, USSR
- Education: Moscow State University
- Occupation: Journalist
- Years active: 1995-present
- Known for: TV Rain
- Mikhail Fishman's voice From the Echo of Moscow program, 15 March 2014

Mikhail Vladimirovich Fishman (Russian: Михаил Владимирович Фишман; born 1972) is a Russian journalist and television presenter. He has anchored the TV Rain program «И так далее» ("And so on") since 2010. Fishman also wrote columns for Forbes, Die Welt and the Russian business daily Vedomosti. He has previously contributed to many publications and edited several including the weeklies The Moscow Times and the Russian Newsweek.

== Early life ==
Fishman was born on 3 December 1972 in Moscow. He is a grandson of biophysicist Mikhail Volkenstein and nephew of film director Vladimir Alenikov. He is Jewish. He graduated in 1995 from the philology department of Lomonosov Moscow State University.

== Career ==
Fishman has worked for several media outlets in Russia, often concurrently supplying material for more than one publication. After graduating, he worked first for radio station Echo of Moscow and newspaper Kommersant, and later for such outlets as Russkiy telegraf «Русский телеграф» and the magazines Results «Итоги» and Internet «Интернет». Between 1998 and 2003 he was a journalist, reviewer and editor for the internet publications «Полит.ру» (polit.ru) and «Еженедельный журнал» (ejforever.com). From 2000 to 2008 he wrote articles for the internet publication «Газета.Ru» (gazeta.ru).

In 2004 he joined the newly created Russian edition of Newsweek as a political commentator, and became deputy editor under chief editor Aleksandr Gordeev. After a break from Jan-Nov 2006 as a special correspondent for Kommersant, Fishman returned to Newsweek as political editor. In Sept 2008 he succeeded Kyrill Aleksandrovich as Russian Newsweek's editor-in-chief. Fishman remained as editor of Russian Newsweek until October 2010, when its owner, Axel Springer Russia, the Russian subsidiary of the German media concern Axel Springer AG terminated publication "for economic reasons".

In November 2008, Fishman was awarded the Paul Klebnikov Prize for Excellence in Journalism. Fishman had been with Klebnikov as the latter was dying after he was attacked on a Moscow street in 2004.

In March 2010 Fishman was reportedly smeared in a sting involving hookers and cocaine. Fishman was quoted by The Sunday Times as saying the "KGB style tactic" was a signal to independent journalists to keep a low profile.

In 2013 he became editor-in-chief of an online paper startup project for Moscow's metropolitan area, Cityboom, and remained until it was closed in July 2014.

In the autumn of 2015 Fishman became editor-in-chief of the English-language paper The Moscow Times. The last printed edition was published on 6 July 2017, and Fishman left the organisation.

Since 2015 he has presented an annual program Conversation with Dimitry Medvedev on TV Rain. His weekly current affairs discussion show And so on with Mikhail Fishman appears on the same channel each Friday evening. That show discusses major events of the past seven days, puts them into context and examines their implications.

In a 2017 opinion contribution to CNN, Fishman lamented the pressures that he blamed for "the decline of editorial freedom and professional integrity in journalism in Russia".
