= Tikhon Dzyadko =

Russian journalist, television presenter and media manager (born 1987)

- Тихон Викторович Дзядко
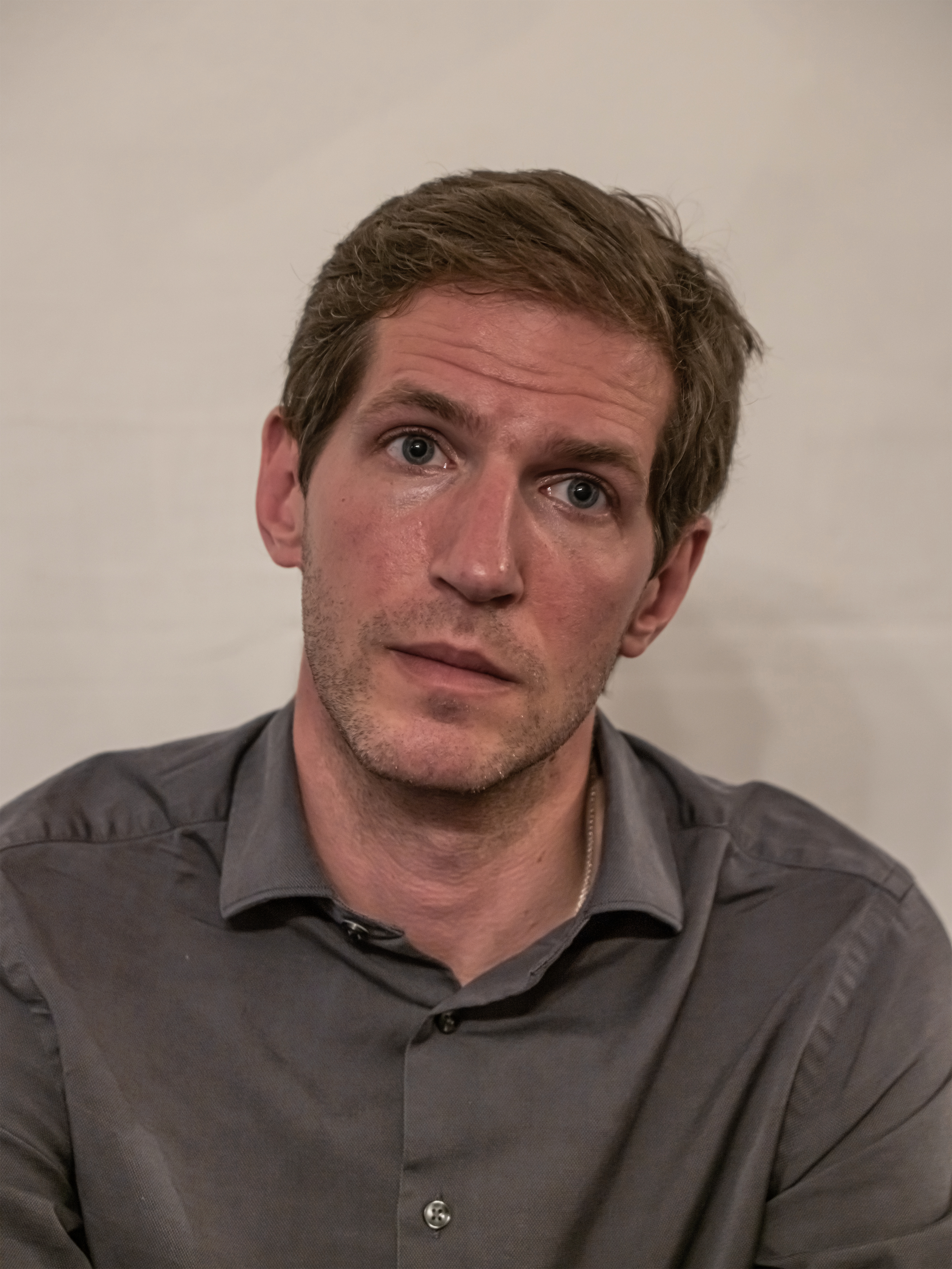
- Dzyadko in 2024
- Born: Tikhon Viktorovich Dzyadko; 23 June 1987 (age 39); Moscow, Soviet Union
- Citizenship: Russia
- Education: Russian State University for the Humanities
- Occupations: Journalist, television and radio presenter, media manager, editor
- Years active: 2005 — present
- Known for: Editor-in-chief of TV Rain
- Spouse: Ekaterina Kotrikadze (m. 2019)
- Children: 3
- Mother: Zoya Svetova

Tikhon Viktorovich Dzyadko (Russian: Тихон Викторович Дзядко, IPA: [ˈtʲixən dzʲɪtˈko]; born June 23, 1987) is a Russian journalist, television presenter and media manager. He is the editor-in-chief of the TV Rain channel, former deputy editor-in-chief and host of the RTVI TV network. He previously worked at the radio station Echo of Moscow and the Ukrainian channel Inter.

== Biography ==
=== Education ===
Dzyadko studied at the Russian State University for the Humanities at the Faculty of Philology.

=== Career ===
He worked at the portal Polit.ru. From 2007 to 2012 he worked as a correspondent in Russia for the international organisation Reporters Without Borders.

From 2005 to 2013 he worked as a correspondent and presenter at the radio station Echo of Moscow, hosted the programmes Разворот, Одним словом, Обложка-1 and Супервласть.

From May 2010 to October 2013, together with his brothers Philipp and Timofei, he led the weekly public affairs programme Dzyadko3 on TV Rain. Since May 24, 2011, on the same TV channel he has hosted the weekly Hard Day's Night programme. In 2012, Tikhon was nominated for the Made in Russia award for the programme.

In August 2015, he left TV Rain to start working on the TV channel Inter in Washington, D.C. He started working as a news anchor on RTVI in 2016. From January 2018 to December 2019 he was Deputy Editor-in-Chief of the TV channel.

In December 2019, Dzyadko became the chief editor of TV Rain, replacing Alexandra Perepelova in this position.

=== Political position ===
In March 2014, he signed an appeal against the annexation of Crimea by the Russian Federation. Participant of the Congress "Ukraine – Russia: Dialogue", held on April 24–25, 2014 in Kyiv.

On October 14, 2022, Russian Ministry of Justice included Dzyadko in its "foreign agents" list.

A criminal case was opened against Dzyadko for disseminating false information under the wartime censorship law. On October 7, 2025, Dzyadko was added to Rosfinmonitoring's list of terrorists and extremists.

== Family ==
Tikhon's father, Dzyadko Viktor Mikhailovich (1955–2020), was a programmer, Soviet human rights activist and artist. His mother Zoya Svetova is a journalist and human rights activist. He has two brothers, Philipp and Timofey. He has two children from a previous marriage.

Dzyadko is married to journalist Ekaterina Kotrikadze. They have a son, Maxim.
