= Ekaterina Kotrikadze =

Georgian-Russian journalist and news presenter

- ეკატერინე კოტრიკაძე
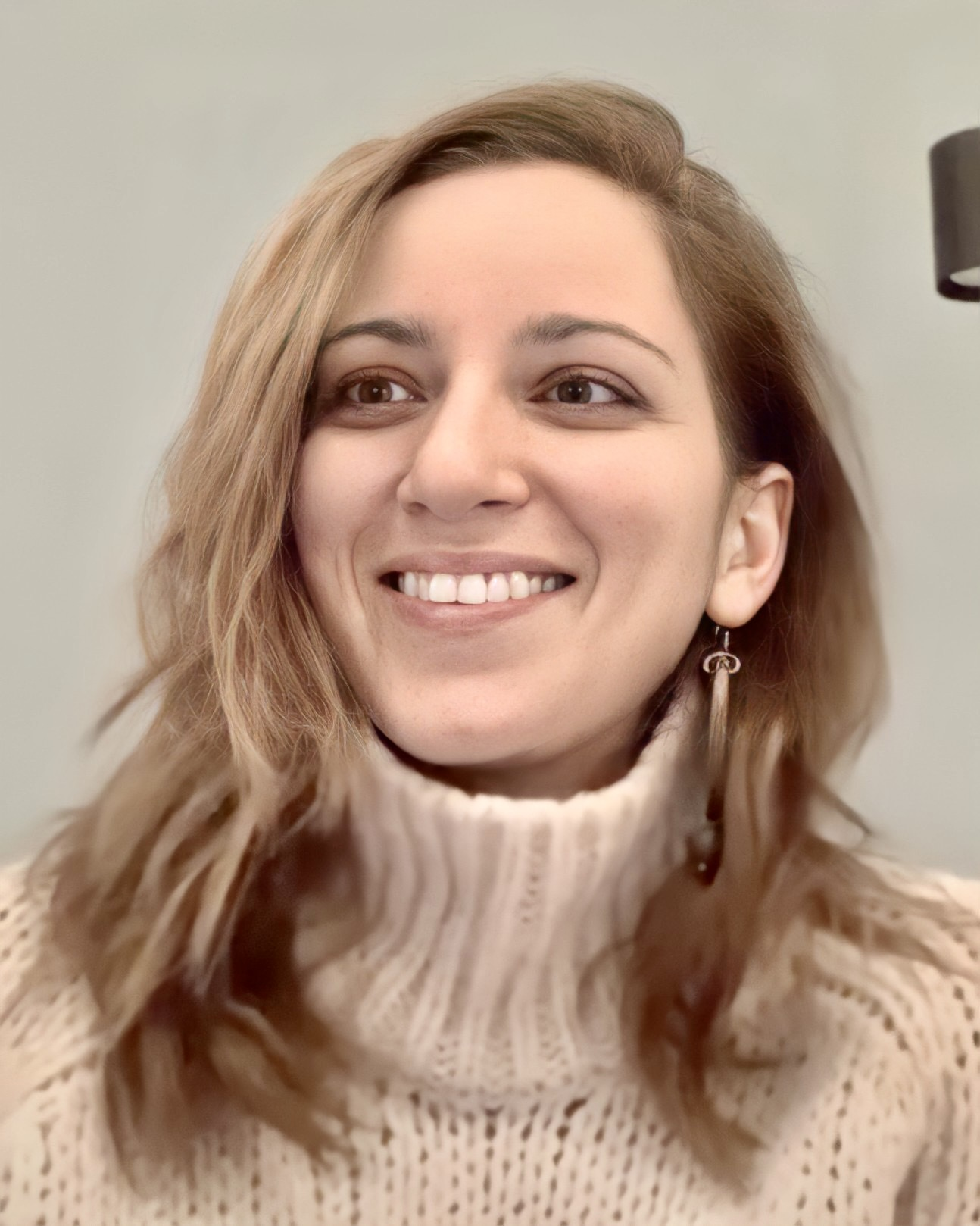
- Kotrikadze in 2021
- Born: Yekaterina Besikiyevna Kotrikadze; 23 March 1984 (age 42); Tbilisi, Georgian Soviet Socialist Republic, Soviet Union
- Citizenship: Georgia
- Education: Moscow State University
- Occupations: Journalist, television presenter, media manager
- Years active: 2003 — present
- Spouse(s): Egor Kuroptev; Alexey Zyunkin Tikhon Dzyadko (m. 2019)
- Awards: Redkollegia (Bring Back That Memory, 2021)

Yekaterina Besikiyevna Kotrikadze (Note: Also transliterated as Ekaterina) (Russian: Екатерина Бесикиевна Котрикадзе; Georgian: ეკატერინე კოტრიკაძე, romanized: Ekaterine Kotrikadze; born 23 March 1984) is a Georgian journalist and media manager, host of the TV Rain channel and the former head of the information service of the RTVI TV channel.

After having criticized the Russian president Vladimir Putin for having started the Russian invasion of Ukraine, she moved to Latvia for security reasons.

== Biography ==
=== Early life ===
Ekaterina Kotrikadze was born in Tbilisi, then the Georgian Soviet Socialist Republic. In 2005 she graduated with honours from the Faculty of Journalism of Moscow State University.

Her mother died in the explosion of house number 19 on Guryanov Street in Moscow in 1999; their apartment was above the epicenter of the explosion.

=== Career ===
From 2003 to 2005, Ekaterina worked on the Dangerous Zone (Russian: Опасная зона) programme on the TVC channel.

In 2006 she returned to Georgia. The first place of work in Georgia was the Alania TV channel, where Kotrikadze started from the position of an ordinary reporter, having worked for three years. At the same time, in 2008, she began cooperation on the RTVI channel as a correspondent for Georgia. In 2009 she began working for the Russian radio station Echo of Moscow.

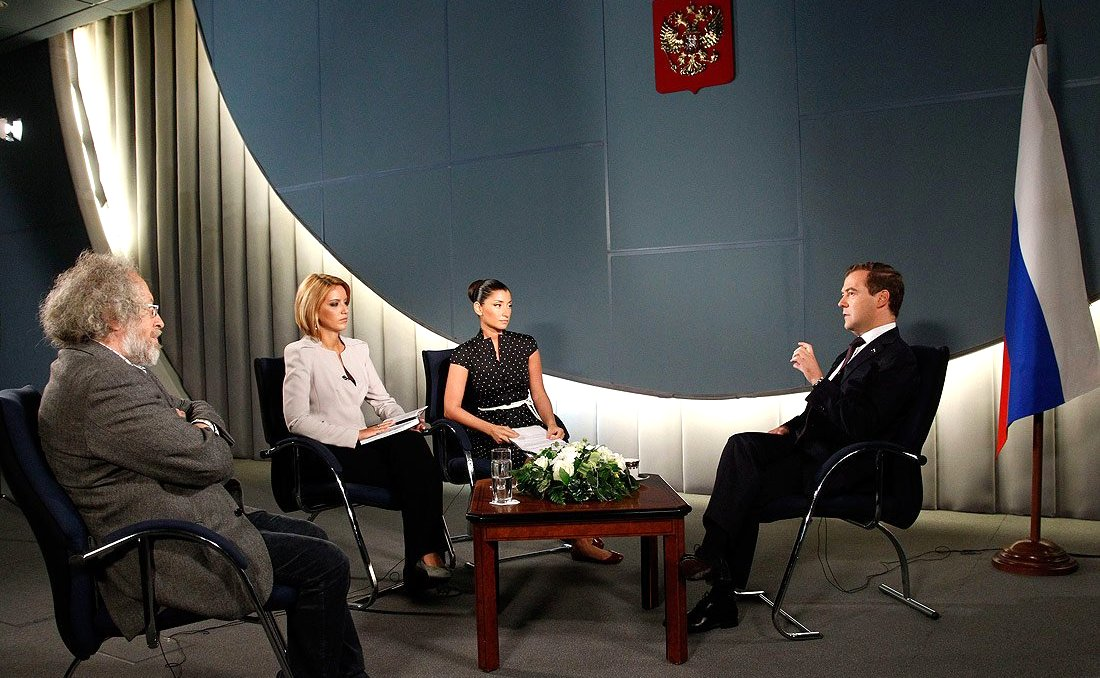
Kotrikadze interviewing Dmitry Medvedev along with Alexei Venediktov and Sophie Shevardnadze in 2011

In October 2009, she became one of the founders of the Russian-language television channel the First informational Caucasian (FIC), which was created in Georgia. Ekaterina headed the information service and in 2011 she took the position of general director, in 2012 – chief editor of the information service.

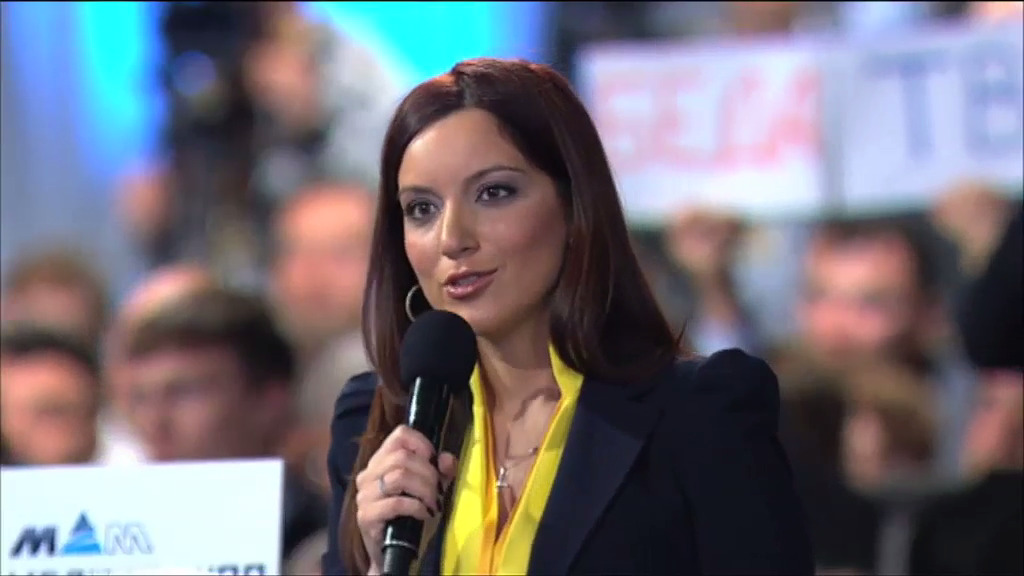
Kotrikadze during Vladimir Putin's press conference in 2013

In 2012, after the closure of the FIC channel, she accepted RTVi's invitation to become head of the information service and form the channel's editorial policy. In 2016, after Alexey Pivovarov joined the channel as general producer and editor-in-chief, she was appointed deputy editor-in-chief.

In February 2018, she accused Leonid Slutsky, a member of the Russian State Duma from the Liberal Democratic Party, of sexual harassment.

In April 2019, she was invited as a speaker on the topic of the safety of journalists at the international journalism festival in Perugia, Italy.

In June 2020, she went on maternity leave, and later left RTVi.

Since September 2020, she has been a host of the TV Rain channel.

=== Political persecution ===
On October 28, 2022, Russian Ministry of Justice included Kotrikadze in its "foreign agents" for her political activity and accused her of receiving funding by Ukraine.

On July 18, 2025, Russian Investigative Committee opened a criminal case against Kotrikadze for "fakes about the Russian army" and "non-fulfillment of duties of a foreign agent". On September 5, Kotrikadze was placed on the Russian criminal wanted list. On October 5, Kotrikadze was added to Rosfinmonitoring's list of terrorists and extremists.

=== Personal life ===
Ekaterina Kotrikadze's first husband was Egor Kuroptev. Her second husband was Alexey Zyunkin and the couple have a son.

In 2019, she married Russian journalist Tikhon Dzyadko.
