= Zinaida Pronchenko =

Russian film historian, critic, and journalist

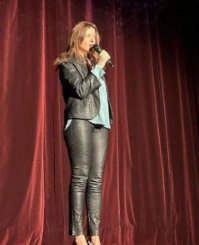
- Born: Zinaida Sergeyevna Pronchenko; September 11, 1981 (age 44); Leningrad, RSFSR, USSR
- Citizenship: Russia
- Occupations: film critic journalist
- Children: 1

Zinaida Sergeyevna Pronchenko (Russian: Зинаи́да Серге́евна Про́нченко; born September 11, 1981, Leningrad) is a Russian film historian, film critic, and journalist. She is the Chief editor of Iskusstvo Kino's site since April 1, 2020.

== Biography ==
A native of Leningrad, Pronchenko graduated from the Faculty of History and Theory of Arts at the Saint Petersburg Repin Academy of Arts. She studied at the High Courses for Scriptwriters and Film Directors (workshop of Pyotr Todorovsky and Natalya Ryazantseva). She studied comparative art studies at the Higher School of European Cultures at the Russian State University for the Humanities. As a director, she shot several short films. She lived in France for several years.

Pronchenko is a regular contributor to a number of publications on film and culture, including Forbes Russia and Gorky Media.

In March 2022, she signed a collective appeal of film critics, film historians and film journalists of Russia against Russian invasion of Ukraine.

In April 2025, she became the editor-in-chief of the online publication Republic.ru.

== Bibliography ==
- Alain Delon (2021) ISBN 978-5-604-27950-2
- The Protagonist. Biography of Leonardo DiCaprio (2025) ISBN 978-5-04-200473-5
