= Leonid Bershidsky =

Russian journalist and commentator

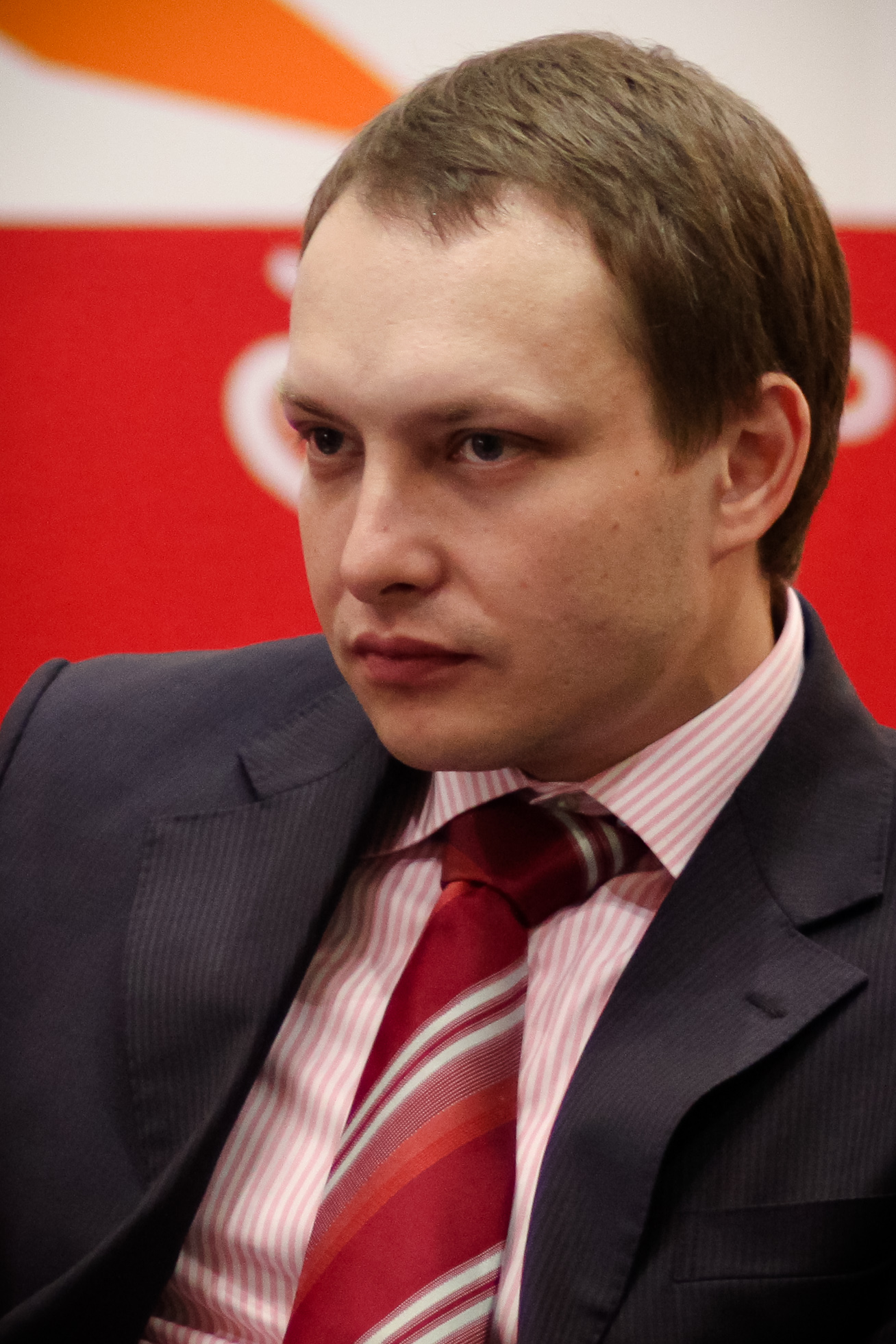
- Bershidsky in September 2010
- Born: Leonid Davidovich Bershidsky (Леонид Давидович Бершидский); 23 November 1971 (age 54); Moscow, Russian SFSR, Soviet Union
- Occupation: Journalist

Leonid Davidovich Bershidsky (Russian: Леони́д Дави́дович Берши́дский; born 23 November 1971) is a Russian journalist, publisher and columnist for Bloomberg View, the editorial division of Bloomberg News. He is currently based in Berlin, Germany.

== Biography ==
Bershidsky was born in Moscow to a Jewish family. He studied at, but did not finish, the Moscow State Linguistic University and the University of California. He spent a year in France on his MBA from INSEAD in Fontainebleau, France.

In the late 1980s and early 1990s, he worked at The Philadelphia Inquirer, Newsweek, The Moscow Times, and was the chief editor of "Capital" weekly. From 1999 to 2002, he was the first editor in chief of the newspaper Vedomosti.

In 2007, at the invitation of Alexander I. Vinokourov, Bershidsky went into business as the managing director of KIT Finance Investment Bank. In 2009, Bershidsky became a co-owner and chief editor of the business website Slon.ru. In 2010, he was appointed director of the business book division of Eksmo, a Moscow book publisher.

He has written several novels in the genre of art-detective: Rembrandt must die (2011), Devil's Trill, or test Stradivari (2011), Eight Faberge (2012). In 2011, Bershidsky retired from Slon.ru and began working in the Ukrainian magazine consultant project "Focus." In 2012, he edited the Ukrainian web portal Forbes.ua. In 2014 after the Russian annexation of Crimea, Bershidsky announced his emigration to Germany.
