= Vera Krichevskaya =

Russian-British filmmaker and journalist

Vera Krichevskaya (born November 10, 1974) is a UK-based Russian filmmaker, journalist, screenwriter, television director, and producer known for her contributions to independent media and documentary filmmaking. She co-founded TV Rain, an independent Russian television channel, and has directed documentaries such as F@ck This Job (2021), which examines the challenges faced by independent media in Russia.

== Early life and education ==
Krichevskaya was born on November 10, 1974, in Leningrad, Soviet Union (now Saint Petersburg, Russia). She attended the Gymnasium at the State Russian Museum during her school years and worked as a correspondent for the youth newspaper Change from 1990 to 1993. She graduated from the Russian State Institute of Performing Arts in 1996 with a degree in theater criticism and editing-screenwriting for television. She later earned a diploma in feature film direction from the High Courses for Scriptwriters and Film Directors. In 2014, she moved to the United Kingdom.

== Career ==
Krichevskaya began her television career in 1992, working at 5TV and the State Television and Radio Broadcasting Company. She contributed as an author and editor to programs such as the musical supplement Zebra and the documentary Silver Ida, about Soviet writer and photographer Ida Nappelbaum. In 1995, she joined Art Pictures Petersburg as a director, working on programs like Pesnya goda (Channel One Russia) and Hot Ten (Russia-1). From 1996 to 1997, she directed Morning Mail on ORT.

In 1997, Krichevskaya joined NTV, where she directed and produced various projects, including the news program Today (1997–1999) and the anti-drug campaign and TV Show Twilight (1997–1998). She also worked on programs like Favorite Melodies of the 20th Century (1999), and Anthropology with Dmitry Dibrov (1999–2001). During the 2001 NTV takeover, she continued with the channel under Boris Jordan and Rafael Akopov, directing live political talk-show Freedom of Speech with Savik Shuster (2001–2003), Hero of a Day, and producing Country and the World (2003) evening news. She left NTV in 2003.

From 2003, during the Russian legislative election campaign, she produced television coverage and live political debate for the All-Russia State Television and Radio Broadcasting Company under Oleg Dobrodeev. Between 2005 and 2008, she worked in Ukraine for Viktor Pinchuk's Starlight Media, launching The Freedom of Speech (ICTV).

In 2008, Krichevskaya co-founded TV Rain with Natalya Sindeeva, serving as creative producer and chief director until 2011. The channel became known for its independent political coverage. She also authored and produced Constitution on the Rain (2010) and worked as a creative producer for the documentary channel 24 Doc from 2011 to 2013. In 2011, Krichevskaya launched as a creative producer “24Doc” TV cable channel focused on the current affairs documentary from around the globe. From 2024/2025 academic year Krichevskaya works as a Senior Fellow of Watson School Brown University, USA. In 2019 she founded "Six Days Film" a film production company in London.

== Documentary filmmaking ==
Krichevskaya later focused on documentary filmmaking, exploring media censorship and political repression. Her 2021 documentary F@ck This Job (released internationally as Tango with Putin) details TV Rain's history and was screened at international film festivals. In 2025, Connected premiered at Artdocfest in Riga, focusing on Russian journalists in exile.

Beyond documentaries, Krichevskaya edited an episode of the Russian crime drama Liniya zashchity (2002) and co-produced and appeared in an episode of the Dutch series VPRO Backlight (2022), discussing her career.

== Filmography ==
- 2025, Connected (director, producer and editor)
- 2021, F@ck This Job (director, producer, writer and editor)
- 2018, Delo Sobchaka (Director and writer)
- 2016, The Man Who Was Too Free (director and producer)
- 2012, Grazhdanin poet. Progon goda (director, producer and writer)
- 2002, Liniya zashchity (editor) – 1 episode
- 2022, VPRO Backlight (herself)

== Awards and recognition ==
Krichevskaya has received numerous awards for her work, including:

- TEFI Awards – 2000, 2004, 2005 (for television programs)
- Golden Ray – 2010, 2012 (National award in satellite, cable, and Internet television)
- Golden Pen of Russia – 2011
- Glamour Magazine Director of the Year – 2018
- White Elephant Award – Best Documentary for The Man Who Was Too Free (2017, shared with Mikhail Fishman and Evgeniy Gindilis)
- Laurel Prize (Lavr Prize) – Best TV Movie for F@ck This Job (2021)
- Thessaloniki Documentary Festival – Amnesty International Award for F@ck This Job (2022)
- Dock Film Festival – Jury Prize for F@ck This Job (2022)
- Golden Unicorn Awards – Best Documentary for Delo Sobchaka (2019)
- Artdocfest Special Prize – Connected (2025)

She was also nominated for the Silver Eye Award (Jihlava International Documentary Film Festival) and Best Documentary Award (Warsaw International Film Festival) for F@ck This Job (2021).
