= Alexei Kozlov (businessman) =

Russian businessman

Alexei Alexandrovich Kozlov (born 1974) is a prominent Russian businessman in the construction sector, believed by human rights groups to have suffered from a conspiracy to expropriate his property. He is the fourth husband of the journalist Olga Romanova, who has written for Novaya Gazeta about the ordeals experienced by her husband and herself, including the pressure on her to bribe officials. Her evidence, as well as that of Yana Yakovleva of Business Solidarity, has been used by the Helsinki Commission (see Commission on Security and Cooperation in Europe) for a briefing on Russian corruption.

Kozlov and Romanova have accused Federation Council member Vladimir Slutsker of conspiring to have Kozlov jailed, and lodged a complaint to that effect with Russia's Prosecutor General, Yury Chaika. Chairman of Korfinans, he was arrested on 30 July 2008 and charged with the fraudulent acquisition of a factory in North West Moscow called 'Artificial Leather'. He was found guilty by the Moscow City Court and is serving a seven-year sentence at a penal colony in the Perm region. He maintains his innocence, and that documentation supports his case, while arguing that he has the evidence of translators and notaries that documents used by the prosecution are forgeries. In July 2011 his prospects of release brightened when the Supreme Court ruled that he had not had a fair trial.

Earlier attempts to appeal his sentence had failed and the official volte face has been attributed by some to the influence of Medvedev, who according to Pavel K. Baev is 'sensitive to the impression that he has lost control over the marauding siloviki and is trying to compensate by making small steps that should prove his commitment to the rule of law.'

Kozlov has himself maintained a blog during his incarceration, called the Butyrka blog after the Moscow prison where he was initially detained. The blog, which several of those involved in human rights in Russia now contribute to, was awarded a Deutsche Welle prize in 2010.

In 2005–08 was married to Olga Romanova (journalist). In 2021 married to Maria Makeeva.
