= Natalya Sindeyeva =

Russian entrepreneur

Natalya Sindeeva
- Наталья Синдеева
- Sindeeva in December 2026
- Born: Natalya Vladimirovna Sindeeva; 11 June 1971 (age 55); Michurinsk, Russian SFSR, Soviet Union
- Occupation: Journalist
- Natalya Sindeeva's voice Sindeeva on the Echo of Moscow program, 19 May 2014

Natalya Vladimirovna Sindeeva (Russian: Наталья Владимировна Синдеева, IPA: [nɐˈtalʲjə sʲɪnˈdʲejɪvə]; born 11 June 1971) is a Russian media and arts entrepreneur and producer, the main owner of TV Rain and chair of its board of directors. She built the TV Rain media holding, which at its height included the TV Rain channel, the Republic.ru online magazine and the Big City magazine. She is the co-founder and former general producer of the Silver Rain radio station, and founder of the Silver Galosh anti-award. She is also a three-times winner of the "Media Manager of Russia" prize, an honorary academician of the Russian Academy of Radio. Since 2022 she has lived and worked outside Russia; she has been designated a "foreign agent" and, in 2026, was charged in a criminal case.

== Early life and education ==
Natalya Vladimirovna Sindeeva was born in Michurinsk into the family of a military dentist. From the age of three, Natalya was transferred to the care of her grandparents. As a child, she was fond of sports, graduated from a ballet school, studied music and folk dances. After school she received a specialty "teacher of elementary grades and mathematics" at the Michurinsk State Pedagogical Institute (MGPI).

== Career ==
After graduation in 1992, she moved to Moscow. In the beginning, she worked in an Italian clothing company and on a project for a night show on the water in the Chaika pool. Working as a promoter at one of the exhibitions, Sindeeva met with producer Pavel Vashchekin and later became his personal assistant. At that time, she established contacts with future figures in the media market: Sergei Kozhevnikov, the founder of the Russian Media Group, radio producer Mikhail Kozyrev, Andrei Wolf and Otar Kushanashvili. In 1993, she moved to the 2x2 TV channel, where she worked her way up from secretary to producer of the Thousand and One Nights TV show.

While working on 2x2, Sindeeva met her future husband Dmitry Savitsky. The couple started creating the FM radio station Silver Rain. While working on the radio, Sindeeva met a Russian businessman and restaurateur Jamil Asfari, who became her second husband. In 2002, the couple had a son, Luka.

In 2005, at a match of the Chelsea football club, Sindeeva met the banker Alexander Vinokurov, who was then the head of the investment bank KIT Finance. In 2006, she graduated from the Stockholm School of Economics Russia, course of business development Entrepreneur Essential 4. In 2006 Sindeeva and Vinokurov married and in 2009, their daughter Alexandra, was born. Together with Vinokurov, who became the main investor, Sindeeva created the TV Rain media holding.

=== Silver Rain, 1995–2009 ===
Together with her first husband, Dmitry Savitsky, Sindeeva created the Silver Rain FM radio station. The first broadcast took place in 1995. Savitsky became the general director, and Sindeeva became the general producer of the station and organizer of the anti-award for dubious achievements Silver Galosh. Many journalists were brought to work at the radio station. In addition, Silver Rain gained an audience via the Internet and the concept of "music non-stop" was introduced by Sindeeva.

From 2002 to 2009, Natalya served as commercial director of Silver Rain, while retaining the position of general producer. After leaving the radio station, she remained its co-owner.

=== TV Rain media holding, 2007–2022 ===
In 2007, Natalya Sindeeva began developing TV Rain with Vera Krichevskaya; the channel launched online in 2010. Sindeeva also developed the larger TV Rain media holding, which at that time included the TV Rain channel, the Republic.ru publication and the Big City magazine.

Aleksandr Vinokurov is an investor in all three projects, but legally Sindeeva alone owned Republic and Big City which later were spun off. The exact investment in the holding has not been disclosed, but by mid-2013, according to some estimates, the total investment in the channel alone could have reached $40 million.

In 2012, the total revenue of the holding amounted to 433 million rubles, according to Russian Accounting Standards. The TV channel accounted for almost 66% — 285 million rubles, the Slon.ru portal (created in 2009) — 20%, the rest – the magazine and website Bolshoi Gorod (acquired in 2010). At the time, none of the resources brought an operating profit. In June 2014, plans were announced to combine all projects into one holding company and bring it to an IPO on the Moscow Exchange.

In late January 2014, shortly before Russia's annexation of Crimea, the major cable and satellite providers dropped TV Rain after it ran an online poll about the World War II siege of Leningrad. Before the scandal, the channel reached about 17.7 million homes. Sindeeva said the providers had acted under pressure from the Kremlin. The government also put TV Rain on a blacklist, which discouraged businesses from advertising with it or continuing partnerships, and the channel was evicted from its studio. The Russian parliament also passed a law at this time prohibiting advertising on cable channels, which cut off TV Rain's main source of revenue.

To survive the loss of its advertising, TV Rain switched to an online subscription model, which kept the channel going.

In 2019, during the Moscow protests, in which many young people took to the streets against the exclusion of independent candidates from the Moscow City Duma election, the authorities detained more than a thousand protesters. TV Rain considered the protests an important event and removed the paywall from its live broadcasts so that everyone in the country could watch. The TV Rain audience grew, and YouTube became its most important platform.

TV Rain became the most influential independent channel in Russia, always under pressure of the state authorities. It was declared a 'foreign agent' in 2021.

Following Russia's invasion of Ukraine on 24 February 2022, the media regulator Roskomnadzor blocked TV Rain and other independent media outlets.

Authorities accused independent media of spreading "false information" about what they called a "special military operation", and a bill introduced in the State Duma made discrediting the military and spreading "fake news" about it crimes punishable by up to 15 years in prison. The TV Rain team decided that, as journalists, they could not in good conscience comply with this military censorship, and on 3 March Sindeeva announced on air that the current broadcast would be the last for the time being. At the end of the final broadcast, the staff gathered in the studio, said "No to war" and walked off the set together. The channel then showed a black-and-white clip of Tchaikovsky's ballet Swan Lake, which Russians recognized as a reference to the attempted coup of August 1991. Many editorial staff left Russia around the time of the final broadcast, fearing arrest; Sindeeva later left as well.

=== Exile, 2022–present ===
After the channel's last broadcast in Russia, TV Rain restarted outside the country. The network received a Latvian broadcasting license in June 2022, and in July it announced its return, with studios set to operate in Riga, Amsterdam, Tbilisi and Paris. TV Rain has been based in the Netherlands since 2022, with its main studio in Amsterdam.

In October 2022, Russia's Justice Ministry added Sindeeva herself to its register of "foreign agents". In July 2023, Russia's Prosecutor General's Office declared TV Rain an "undesirable organization", stating that the channel's foreign legal entities had been created by a "foreign journalist", Sindeeva.

Sindeeva now chairs TV Rain's board of directors; Mark Ten has served as the channel's general director since April 2024. In August 2026, Russian authorities opened a criminal case against Sindeeva and Ten, accusing them of organizing the activities of an undesirable organization, a charge that carries two to six years in prison. In September 2026 both were arrested in absentia, and in October 2026 a Moscow court sentenced Ten in absentia to five years in a penal colony. No verdict against Sindeeva had been reported at that time.

Sindeeva's son, Luka Asfari, is the publisher of Republic (republicmag.io, formerly Republic.ru), which is now based in Amsterdam.

== Documentary ==
A documentary, F@ck This Job, presented as Tango with Putin by Storyville, a BBC documentary series, about the history of TV Rain over 12 years and Sindeyeva's involvement in the station, was directed by Vera Krichevskaya, and released in 2021. The documentary is available to stream on Amazon Prime in the US, under the title Tango with Putin, and on Apple TV, Google Play and other platforms in Europe.

== Personal life ==
On 2 February 2020 Sindeeva announced on her own program that she had been diagnosed with breast cancer. She has since recovered and is in good health.

Sindeeva is a passionate tango dancer. She and Vinokurov are divorced. She has been married three times and has two children, a son, Luka, and a daughter, Alexandra. She lives in Amsterdam.

== Awards ==
In 2004, Sindeeva became a laureate of the Media Manager of Russia award in the Radio category — "for innovative and non-standard approaches to the station's off-air promo campaigns".

In 2016, Sindeeva became a laureate of the Moscow Helsinki Group Prize for the Protection of Human Rights.

In 2021, she won the Kamerton award.
