= Silver Rain Radio =

- "Intelligent Radio" (Умное радио)

Russia
- Broadcast area: Russia
- Frequency: 100.1 FM

Ownership
- Owner: Mediaindustriya CJSC (Vladimir Orlovsky); (Silver Rain Radio Station CJSC)

Links
- Website: www.silver.ru

Silver Rain Radio (Russian: Серебряный Дождь) is a Russian (including post-Soviet countries) FM radio station since July 4, 1995. Radio frequency in Moscow, Russia – 100,1 FM. Since June 2024, the station is owned and operated by Mediaindustriya CJSC of former Uralchem general manager Vladimir Orlovsky.

Silver Rain Radio is the initiator of the Silver Galosh Award for the most dubious achievements in show business every year. This prize awarded at the congress-hall of Radisson-Slavyanskaya hotel. It is known for being the most eccentric radio station in Russia. The award can be compared to The Razzies.

== History timeline ==
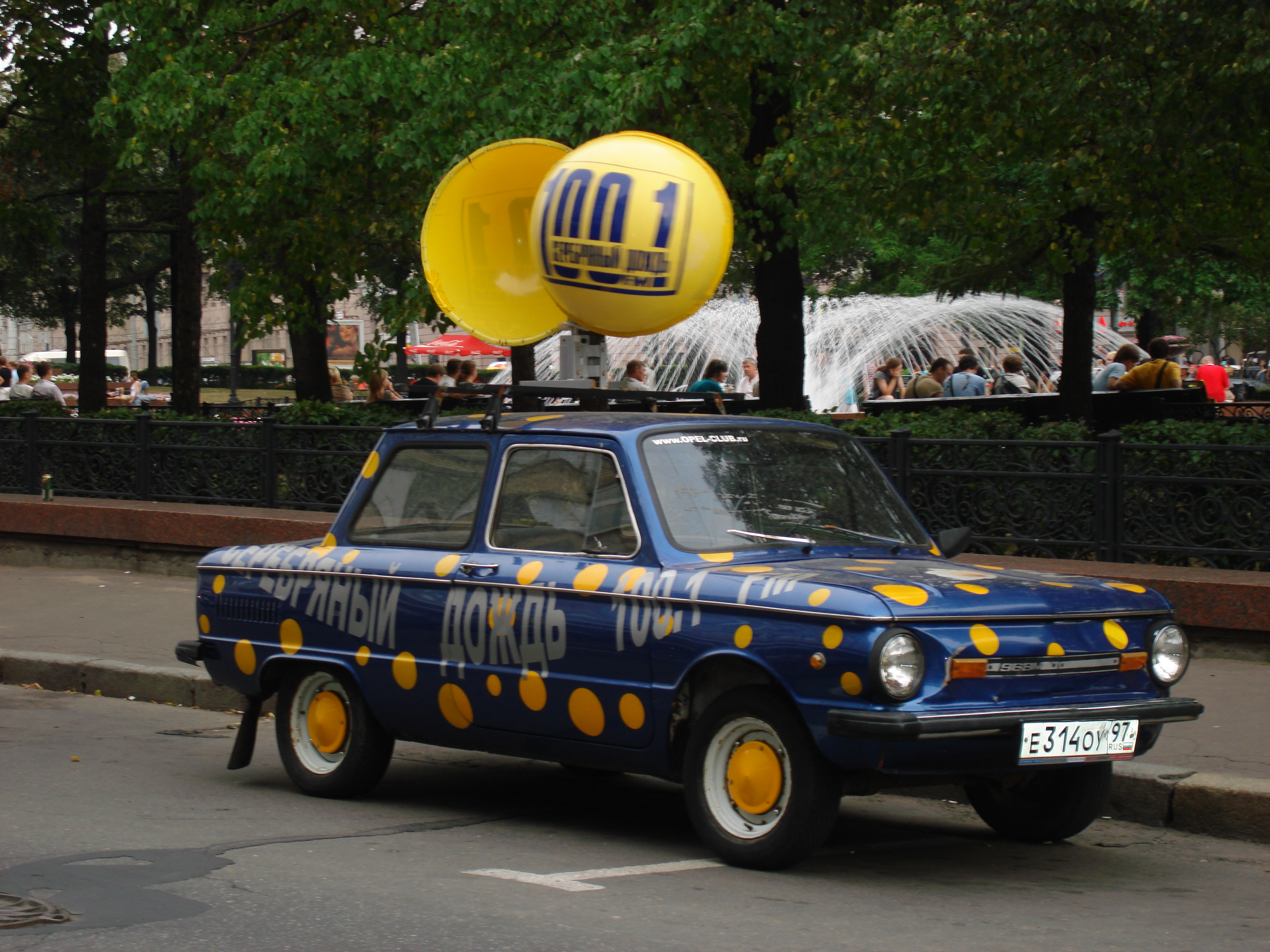
Zaporozhets of Silver Rain Radio (as seen in 2007)

- On February 3, 1996, awarded with the first "Quality Mark" Prize
- On March 26, 1996, first Silver Galosh '96 ceremony.
- Since October 20, 1996 starts online broadcasting.
- Was one of the sponsors of Russian Mars 96 artificial satellite launched on November 16, 1996
- On July 4, 1997, first morning show of Vladimir Soloviev aired
- On February 27, 1997, introduced the new broadcasting scheme music non-stop
- On January 15, 1997, started to transmit the RDS signals for car audio devices.
- On 1998 April Fool's Day started a Ukrainian broadcasting instead of the usual Russian. Also in the announcement on the previous day the promotion department constated the closing of Russian Office and the migration to Ukrainian FM space.
- On June 6, 1998, the Lowered Ball '98 football match held between the radiostation staff and the audience football teams.
- On December 31, 1999 special correspondent Alexander Begak raised a flag of Silver Rain Radio on the highest peak of Antarctica. The other record was in the air of Thailand when 572 paratroopers grouped around the same flag – this was a message of Happy Birthday to the King of Thailand.
- On January 25, 1999, first shows of Savik Schuster aired – football show Out of play and an informational project (together with Radio Svoboda)
- On December 31, 2000, a frost-resisting fountain full of Vodka opened
- On January 22, 2001, the new show of Yuriy Ohochinskiy Stars fall out of the sky about the most notable performers of 1950-1960-th aired
- Since January 17, 2002 the new electronic music and literary exquisites show of Vlad Copp Elements. Assembly Model aired (together with Mus-TV).
- On February 3, 2002 Lou Bega performs on the birthday of Silver Rain Radio
- On May 29, 2002, became the first who interviewed Cesária Évora in Russia , , , ,
- On June 3, 2002, the first interview of Rhythm and blues King James Brown in Russia
- On June 20 Silver Galosh '02 became the most row and most provoking Russian ceremony ever conducted , ,
- On October 14, 2002 Nina Hagen in the studio of Silver Rain Radio , ,
- On November 20, 2002, became the first radiostation in Russia to present an Adriano Celentano's new album – Per sempre.
- On 2003 Valentine's Day a Monument to All in love opened during the Silver Kiss action in the Moscow Hermitage Garden. It was sold later for $4,000 in an act of charity to be erected again every year. , ,
- On 2003 April Fool's Day the action Destroy Your Lavatory Pan held under the motto "You deserve to sit on better things!". Pans of some lucky guys were broken live and then replaced with the new wonder of sanitary engineering
- On June 10, 2003 Engelbert Humperdinck on Silver Rain Radio
- On July 25, 2003 Jay-Jay Johanson on Silver Rain Radio
- On August 8, 2003 Toto Cutugnio on Silver Rain Radio
- On December 9, 2003 Manfred Mann on Silver Rain Radio
- On May 18, 2004 B. B. King on Silver Rain Radio ,
- On August 4, 2004 Dani Klein (Vaya Con Dios) on Silver Rain Radio
- On March 3, 2005 Earth Wind & Fire (Verdin White, Ralph Johnson) on Silver Rain Radio
- On April 1, 2005 Freedom Dance (art-ballet) on Silver Rain Radio
- On April 22, 2005 Alan Parsons on Silver Rain Radio
- On October 19, 2005 Phil Collins on Silver Rain Radio
- On March 9, 2006 Chris Rea on Silver Rain Radio
- On July 27, 2006 Jethro Tull on Silver Rain Radio
- On August 8, 2006 Liza Minnelli on Silver Rain Radio

Source: Silver Rain Radio Homepage (translated from Russian)

== Staff ==
- Elena Raskatova
- Michael Plotnikov
- Lyusiya Green
- Pavel Vashekin
- Ekaterina Schevtsova
- David Schneiderov
- Philip Obruchev
- Leonid Volodarskiy
- Eugene Bakaev and Vika Agapova
- Vladimir Solovyov
- Savik Schuster
- Yuriy Ohochinskiy
- Vlad Copp
- Alex Dubas ("Something Good")

== Former staff ==
- Nikolay Pivnenko
- Alexey Alexeyevich Eibojenko and Konstantin Grigorievich Tsivilev (surnames unknown, used collective pseudonym "Lazy-bones" or Lezheboki )

== Address ==
- Headquarters is located in Russia, Moscow, Petrovsko-Razumovskaya Alleya, 12A, 127083

== Trivia ==
- "To sit into Galosh" is the Russian colloquial phrase for "to get into a mess".

== See also ==
- TV Rain, similarly named broadcaster also co-founded by Natalya Sindeyeva
- List of Russian-language radio stations
