= The Empire Must Die: Russia's Revolutionary Collapse, 1900-1917 =

2017 book by Mikhail Zygar

- Author: Mikhail Zygar
- Translator: Thomas Hudson
- Genre: Non-fiction
- Publisher: PublicAffairs
- Publication date: 7 November 2017
- Pages: 576
- ISBN: 978-1-610-39832-9

The Empire Must Die: Russia's Revolutionary Collapse, 1900-1917 is a 2017 book by Mikhail Zygar which covers the buildup to Tsar Nicholas II's abdication of the throne, as well as how Russia briefly embraced liberalism and openness in the period before the Russian Revolution began. Zygar has been in self-imposed exile from Russia since the Russian Invasion of Ukraine in 2022.

== Reviews ==
Howard Amos of the New East Digital Archive praised Zygar's focus on the individuals within the Russian Revolution, it also criticized the limitations of focusing on leaders within the revolution, which he stated distracted from the reasons that the working class supported or opposed the revolution. Amos also stated that the book was more an allegory of the politics in modern Russia as it was a historical novel, and that it represented a warning about Russia stumbling into catastrophe.
