= Russky Newsweek =

Weekly Russian news magazine (2004–2010)

- Editor-in-chief: Mikhail Fishman
- Categories: News magazine
- Frequency: Weekly
- Publisher: Axel Springer
- First issue: June 2004
- Final issue: 18 October 2010
- Country: Russia
- Language: Russian

Russky Newsweek (Russian: Русский Newsweek) or Newsweek Russia was a news magazine published in Russia between 2004 and 2010 as the Russian edition of Newsweek. It was the first news magazine of Western origin published in the country.

== History and profile ==
Russky Newsweek was established in June 2004. The license of the magazine was held by the Axel Springer Russia, a subsidiary of Axel Springer AG. The magazine was published on a weekly basis by Axel Springer Russia. The weekly featured detailed articles some of which were critical of Kremlin.

Leonid Parfyonov and Alexander Gordeev served as the editors-in-chief of Russky Newsweek. Between 2009 and 2010 Mikhail Zygar was its political editor and deputy editor-in-chief. Mikhail Fishman was the last editor-in-chief. The magazine was printed in light weight coated paper provided by LEIPA.

Russky Newsweek was the recipient of the Press Leaders-2008 award of the Association of Press Distributors in the category of general interest magazines.

The last issue of Russky Newsweek was published on 18 October 2010 when it ceased publication due to economic reasons.
