= Mikhail Zygar =

Russian journalist (born 1981)

- Михаил Зыгарь
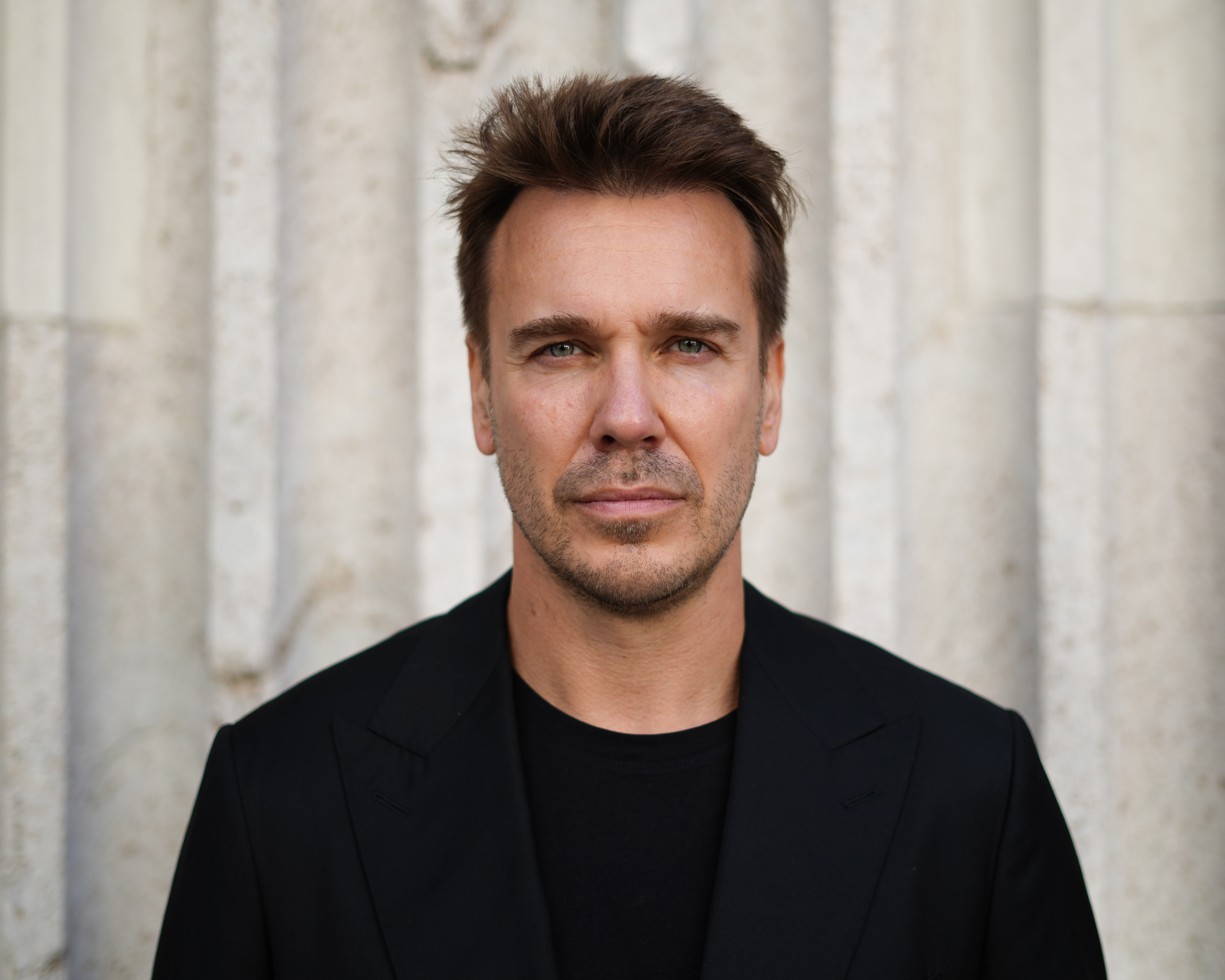
- Zygar in 2023
- Born: Mikhail Viktorovich Zygar; 31 January 1981 (age 45); Moscow, Russian SFSR, Soviet Union
- Education: MGIMO
- Known for: TV Rain
- Notable work: All the Kremlin's Men
- Spouse: Jean-Michel Scherbak

Mikhail Viktorovich Zygar (Russian: Михаи́л Ви́кторович Зы́гарь; born 31 January 1981) is a Russian-born journalist, writer and filmmaker, and the founding editor-in-chief of Russian news channel TV Rain (2010–2015). Under Zygar's leadership, TV Rain provided an alternative to Kremlin-controlled federal TV channels by focusing on news content and giving a platform to opposition voices. The channel's coverage of politically sensitive issues, like the Moscow street protests in 2011 and 2012 as well as the Russo-Ukrainian war, has been dramatically different from the official coverage by Russia's national television stations. Zygar is also the author of the book All the Kremlin's Men (2017), the history of Putin's Russia, based on interviews with Russian politicians from Putin's inner circle.

== Biography ==
Zygar was born in Moscow on 31 January 1981. He became known as a war correspondent of Kommersant, covering wars in Iraq and Lebanon, genocide in Darfur, and revolution in Kyrgyzstan. In May 2005, Zygar was the only international journalist to report from Uzbekistan's Andijan (Andijan massacre). After that, he investigated Russian arms supplies to Uzbekistan. In August 2005, he was beaten by unknown men in Moscow, allegedly Uzbek security agents.

Between 2009 and 2010, he worked as political editor and deputy editor-in-chief of Russky Newsweek.

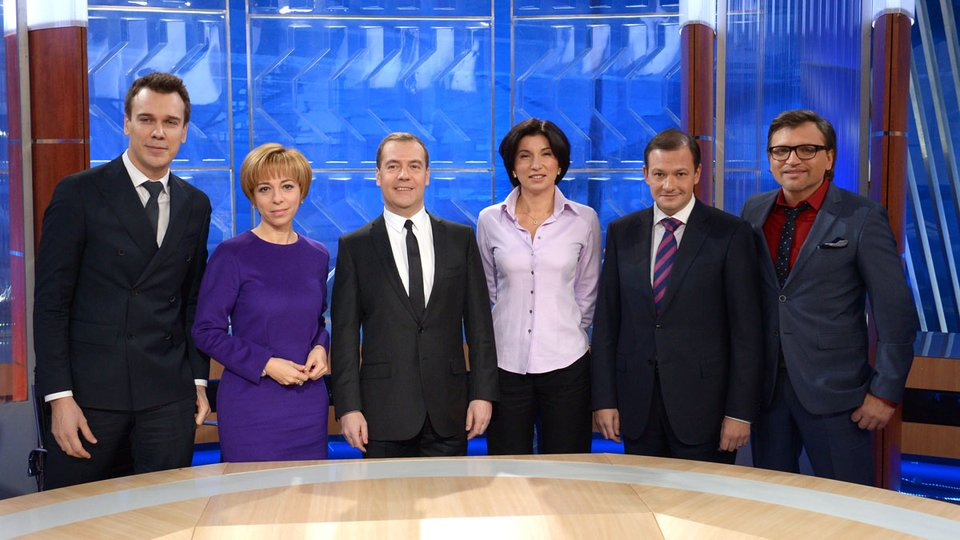
Mikhail Zygar and other journalists during an interview with President Dmitry Medvedev

In 2010, Zygar became the founding editor in chief of TV Rain, the first independent TV-channel in Russia in 10 years. TV Rain rose to prominence in 2011 with its coverage of the mass protests against Vladimir Putin. Zygar organised live coverage of all protest rallies, which were largely not covered by state-owned television. Vice News called Zygar and his team "the last journalists in Russia".

In 2012–2014, Zygar was among the group of 'leading Russian journalists' who had annual interviews with President of Russia (then Prime Minister) Dmitry Medvedev. According to an AP reporter, "Mikhail Zygar's questions were sharper than those of the others".

In 2014, TV Rain became a target of politically motivated attacks. Its troubles began when the channel was aggressively covering the daily anti-government protests in Ukraine, which state-owned television dismissed as a neo-Nazi coup. In that year, nearly all cable networks dropped TV Rain and since then the channel has been largely ignored. The channel cut its expenses in half, shed about 30 percent of its staff and reduced its monthly budget before being hit with an eviction notice. At the same time, TV Rain raised about $1 million in a crowd-funding campaign in March, proving that the demand for independent media in Russia is still present. The TV channel started broadcasting from an ordinary flat in Moscow.

In December 2015, Zygar announced he would be leaving the post of chief editor. He told Kommersant that he intends to engage in his own multimedia project "1917. Free History". "I’m five and a half years running the channel, every Executive needs to expire once a period, that’s right, I gotta do something," added Zygar. But according to other independent media, Zygar's resignation may have been caused by political pressure. Chief editor of Echo of Moscow radio Alexei Venediktov claimed that some high-ranking statesmen, including Prime Minister Dmitry Medvedev, were infuriated by the book, and demanded that TV Rain's owner Natalya Sindeyeva get rid of Zygar.

In 2018, Zygar joined the Information and Democracy Commission, which was created at the initiative of Reporters Without Borders with the intention to "mobilize all those who are committed to defending a free and pluralistic public space, which is essential for democracy".

On 24 February 2022, the day Russia's invasion of Ukraine began, Zygar launched an online petition on Facebook condemning the war. On the third day of the war, he left Russia, and now lives in Berlin.

Zygar writes a weekly column on Russia and the war for Der Spiegel, and a column for The New York Times.

As of April 2022, Zygar has been making a series of interviews on YouTube with "the brightest minds of humanity", including Francis Fukuyama, Robert Sapolsky, Yuval Noah Harari, Steven Pinker, Anne Applebaum, Ralph Fiennes, John Malkovich, Timothy Snyder, Karl Schlögel, Massimo Pigliucci, William Taubman, Fareed Zakaria, Aleksander Kwaśniewski and Mikhail Gorbachev.

He has organized the only interview of Russian independent media with Ukrainian president Volodymyr Zelenskyy since the start of the war. In 2024, he was convicted in absentia for disseminating fake news about the armed forces of the Russian Federation.

=== Personal life ===
On 25 October 2022, Zygar came out and announced his marriage to Russian actor Jean-Michel Scherbak in Portugal.

== Awards ==
In 2014, CPJ announced that Zygar was to receive the International Press Freedom Award. He was the seventh Russian to be honored (after Tatyana Mitkova in 1991, Yevgeny Kiselyov in 1995, Yelena Masyuk in 1997, Musa Muradov in 2003, Dmitry Muratov in 2007 and Nadira Isayeva in 2010).

== Books ==
War in Myth (2007). A collection of Zygar's essays about his work in hotspots like Iraq, Lebanon, Uzbekistan, Kyrgyzstan, etc.

Gazprom. New Russian Weapon (2008), together with Valery Panyushkin. An investigation of the most mighty Russian state-owned corporations.

All the Kremlin's Men (2015) is a non-fiction book about Vladimir Putin and his inner circle. The book was #1 bestseller in Russia for 4 months. In it, Zygar traces Putin's ascent to become the most powerful Russian president in decades, and illustrates the grip that extreme paranoia has on Moscow's power elite. It took Zygar seven years to write, interviewing current and former associates of the Russian president. Zygar criticized the notion of Putin as a savvy puppet-master, stating it was an exaggerated portrait created by both the West and Russian state media. His book also traced how the Russian government embraced an increasingly aggressive worldview which led to the Russian invasion of Ukraine in 2014 as well as their involvement in the Syrian civil war. The book gained popularity in Ukraine, especially the claim that the annexation of Crimea was planned by the Kremlin in December 2013.

Nobel prize winner Svetlana Alexievich praised the book saying that "This is the first consistent description of everything that has happened over the last 20 years that I have read. It is a very serious study and an opportunity to learn from first hand reports". John Kampfner of The Guardian called the book "one of the most compelling" accounts written about Vladimir Putin. The Sydney Morning Herald reviewed the book as a "fascinating, in-depth and authoritative study of Russian politics". The book was also published in Sweden, Germany, Bulgaria, Finland, Poland, Czech Republic, and Hungary. All the Kremlin's Men was published in English in 2016.

Zygar's next book, The Empire Must Die: Russia's Revolutionary Collapse, 1900-1917, was released both in Russian and in English on the centenary of the Russian revolution. It followed how Russian society developed amidst significant changes between 1900 and 1917, as well as the intertwined fates of leading figures such as Tolstoy, Diaghilev, Rasputin, and Stolypin. Emily Tamkin of Foreign Policy described the book as "an immensely compelling work that transports the reader to the streets of St. Petersburg to see the early 20th century unfold for herself". The Empire Must Die is listed among the Best Non-Fiction works of 2017 by Kirkus Reviews, which characterised it as a "a vivid, character-driven reconstruction of the period leading up to the overthrow of the Romanovs".

In 2023, Zygar next published War and Punishment: Putin, Zelensky, and the Path to Russia's Invasion of Ukraine with Simon & Schuster. Nobel Peace Prize winner Dmitry Muratov wrote on the book: "Zygar has invented a new genre. If Tolstoy's story is a wide river, Proust's is a slow river, Zygar’s is a chase. Alas, under President Putin's rule, no one would dare to publish this terrific book in Russia. So it's easy to tell if the regime has changed—if Zygar is openly on sale in Moscow shops, then yes." In The Guardian review, Luke Harding notes: "Zygar rips apart the claim that Russia and Ukraine were co-founded... Zygar has written a fine book. And yet he is unlikely to find the forgiveness he craves, so long as Russia denies Ukraine’s basic right to exist." The book was also featured on The New Yorker's Best Books of 2023 list.

== Future History ==
In 2016, Zygar founded the creative studio Future History specialising in educational digital ventures. In November 2016, the studio launched its first digital project "1917. Free history" that used diary entries, memoirs, letters, pictures etc. of the contemporaries of the Russian Revolution to let Internet users follow their daily events live. The project was supported by Yandex, Sberbank and the Russian social network VKontakte. The project ran until 18 January 2018, the day of the dissolution of the Russian Constituent Assembly.

An English-language version of the website was launched in February 2017.

In 2018, Zygar's Future History studio launched its next digital venture: 1968.digital, a web documentary series with vertical episodes that "show the life of real historical personalities through the screens of their would-be smartphones". The series covers the events of 1968 all over the world and is distributed in English on BuzzFeed News, in Russian and in French on the website of the Libération newspaper. It became a finalist for the 3rd annual Shorty Awards for Social Good in 2018.

Zygar participated in the 2018 TED conference in Vancouver talking about his historical digital ventures and the storytelling techniques he uses in his work.

In November 2018, Future History pre-launched an app of a series of Moscow walking tours – the Mobile Art Theatre. The tours resemble a play taking place in the imagination of the audience, telling the stories of historical figures who lived and worked in these city streets. The first tour is narrated by Kirill Serebrennikov who "tells the history of his neighbourhood in Moscow, which was home to cultural icons such as Mikhail Bulgakov, Boris Pasternak, poet Sergei Yesenin, or philosopher and writer Alexander Herzen".

== Films ==
- To Bury Stalin (2013)
- Who's the Power (2013)
- Past and Duma (2013). Dramatic mini-series about the history of the Russian Parliament.
