= Leonid Parfyonov =

Russian journalist, news presenter, TV producer and author (born 1960)

- Леонид Парфёнов
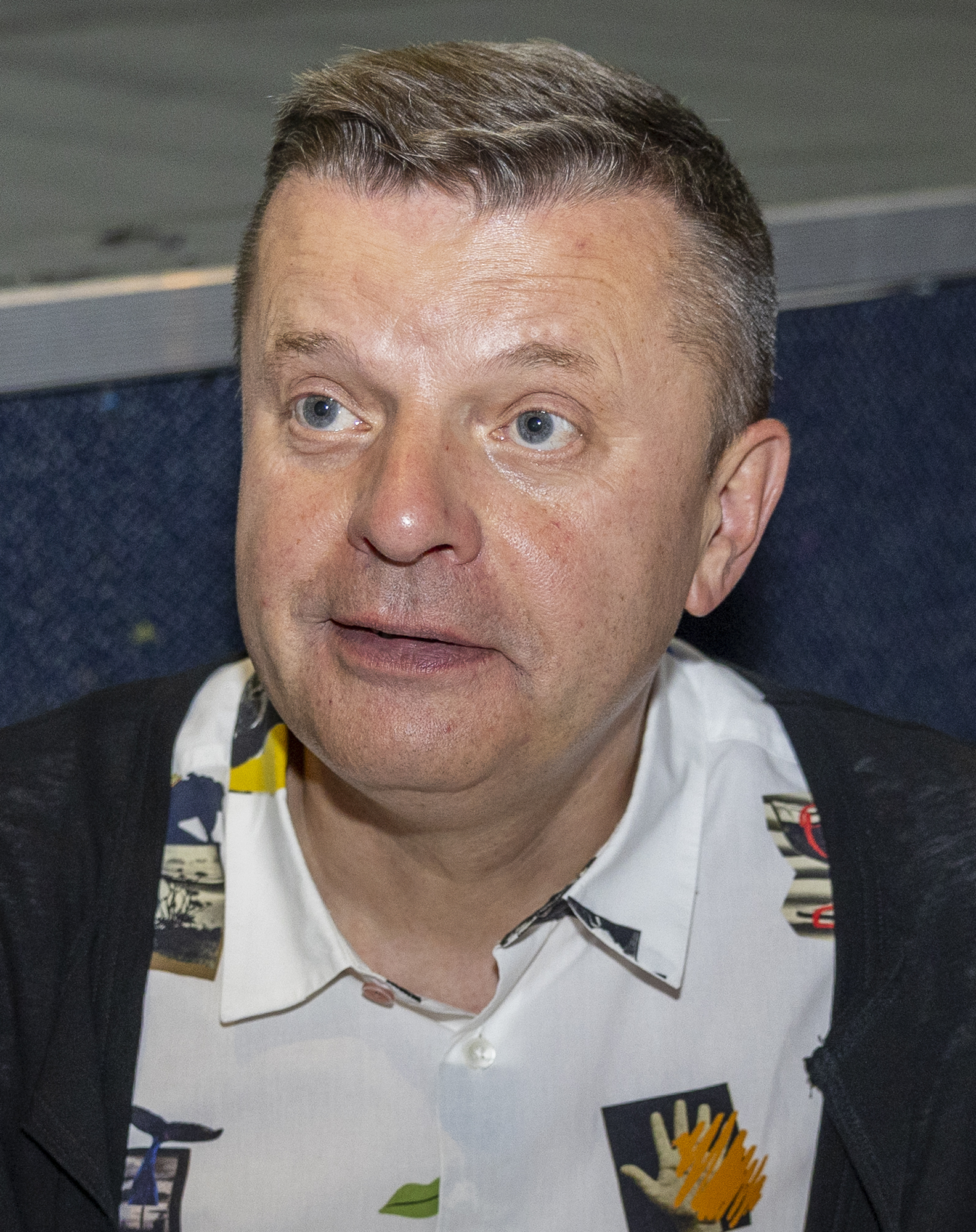
- Parfyonov in 2025
- Born: Leonid Gennadyevich Parfyonov; January 26, 1960 (age 66); Cherepovets, Vologda Oblast, Russian SFSR, Soviet Union
- Citizenship: Soviet Union and Russia → Israel (since 2017)
- Education: Leningrad State University (Journalism, 1982)
- Occupations: Journalist; TV presenter; contributing editor; film director; writer; screenwriter; contributing editor; YouTuber
- Years active: 1986–present
- Spouse(s): Yelena Chekalova (1987–present)
- Website: leonidparfenov.ru

Leonid Gennadyevich Parfyonov (Russian: Леонид Геннадьевич Парфёнов, born January 26, 1960) is a Russian journalist, news presenter, TV producer and author of many documentary TV shows. Parfyonov is known for his studio work and productions for the NTV (of which he was Producer General between 1997 and 1999). From December 3, 2004, until December 20, 2007, he was an editor-in-chief of Russky Newsweek, Russian edition of Newsweek. From 2012 until 2018, Parfyonov was a member of Presidential Council for Civil Society and Human Rights.

As the author and narrator of the daily culture news TV show Namedni on NTV, Parfyonov produced the line of popular history TV documentaries which he narrated and hosted on-site of almost each event portrayed. The series achieved great success and were repeatedly broadcast for years after premiere.

== Early life ==
Leonid Parfyonov was born on January 26, 1960, in Cherepovets, Vologda region. His mother, Alvina Andreevna Parfyonova (maiden name Shmatinina, born 1931), came from the village of Ulomy; his father's ancestors, metallurgical engineer Gennady Viktorovich Parfyonov (1931–2004), were from Yorga. His father was chief engineer of the Cherepovets Iron and Steel Complex. Leonid's brother Vladimir Parfyonov (born 1966) is a businessman, owner of a company selling medical equipment.

Parfyonov studied at school in Cherepovets. In 1973 he received a diploma as a young correspondent of Pionerskaya Pravda. The first big material, for the State Prize, was devoted to Sergey Solovyov's film One Hundred Days After Childhood (1975). In 1977 he entered the Faculty of Journalism at Zhdanov Leningrad University. In the dormitory he lived together with students from Bulgaria, thanks to which he learned the Bulgarian language, which, according to his own words, is still the only foreign language he can speak fluently. He graduated in 1982.

In the Soviet press he was published in such publications as Krasnaya Zvezda, Pravda, Moskovskiye Novosti and Ogoniok. In 1983 he was a correspondent in the newspaper Vologda Komsomolets. For the newspaper he wrote articles on youth culture, fashion, art, in particular he wrote a number of articles about the Leningrad Rock Club. Some time later, two resolutions follow on behalf of the Vologda Regional Committee of the CPSU: "On deficiencies in the newspaper 'Vologda Komsomolets'" and "On serious deficiencies in the newspaper 'Vologda Komsomolets'". After them, Parfyonov would be forced to quit the newspaper and go to work for Vologda Regional TV in Cherepovets, where he worked until he left for Moscow in 1986. On regional TV, he interviewed Aleksandr Bovin, disgraced music journalist Artemy Troitsky, and Gunnar Graps, leader of the Magnetic Band.

He was friends with the future famous rock musician Alexander Bashlachev. It was at Parfyonov's apartment in September 1984 that Bashlachev had his fateful meeting with Artemy Troitsky, after which the latter organized for Bashlachev the first house concerts in Moscow and Leningrad.

== Career ==
=== Television ===
In 1986 Parfyonov was a special correspondent of the youth editorial office of the Central Television, at the same time he worked as a correspondent of the program "The World and Youth". In 1988, he went to work for ATV. In 1989, in co-authorship with Andrey Rasbash, he made a three-part documentary film "Children of the XX Congress" (Russian: "Дети XX съезда") about the generation of the sixties (Yevgeny Yevtushenko, Len Karpinsky, Yegor Yakovlev, Andrei Voznesensky, etc.)

From November 1990 to March 1991 - author and host of the information and analytical program Namedni, which he made together with the TV company ATV. In early 1991, Parfyonov was suspended from the airwaves for making "incorrect" remarks about Eduard Shevardnadze's resignation as foreign minister.

In 1992, he made a series of programs "Delo", telling about the events that took place in the world in 1991.

In 1992, Parfyonov, Konstantin Ernst, Igor Ugolnikov and ex-producer of the TV company VIDgital Svetlana Popova formed the company "Master TV" to produce their own programs, which existed for three years.

From March 1992 to May 1993, on Ostankino Channel 1, Parfyonov was the author and presenter of the documentary "Portrait on the background". At first, he talked about political figures (Gaidar, Rutskoy, Shevardnadze, Nazarbayev), and then devoted the broadcasts to people who personify any era (Zykina, Kirillov, Magomaev, Pugacheva, Grebenshchikov). In December 1992, as part of this program, Parfyonov interviewed Evgeny Leonov, which, as it later turned out, was the last for the popular actor, but was not fully shown on television until 2002.

In October 1993, he moved to work at the newly established television company NTV, where he decided to relaunch the program Namedni, but this time in the format of a "weekly informational program on non-political news." Parfyonov was the first in Russia to wear pink shirts instead of white ones during filming and to appear on air unshaven. This was part of the format he called "infotainment" — news through entertainment.

In 1994, he was the author and host of the project NTV — Novogodnee TeleVidenie (NTV — New Year's Television), for which he received his first TEFI award in the category "Entertainment Program".

On March 15, 1995, Leonid Parfyonov hosted an episode of Vladislav Listyev's talk show Chas Pik (Rush Hour) on Channel 1 Ostankino.

== Selected filmography as narrator and producer ==
- Namedni 1961–1991: Nasha era (1997) (Russian: "Намедни 1961-1991: Наша эра", literally "Recently: Our Era") and 2003 sequel Namedni 1961–2003: Novaya era (Russian: "Намедни 1961-2003: Новая эра", literally ("Recently: New Era") are TV series recapping the History of the Soviet Union and modern Russia since 1961 in 42 year-part manner.
- Rossiyskaya imperiya (Russian: "Российская империя", literally "Russian Empire") (2000–2003) is a similar, but larger-span project dedicated to the History of Russian Empire starting with the Peter the Great rule. The series also used animation and additional narration by famous stage actress Alla Demidova.
- Noveyshaya istoriya. Semnadtsat mgnoveniy 25 let spustia (Russian: Новейшая история. Семнадцать мгновений весны 25 лет спустя) (1998) and Noveyshaya istoriya. Mesto vstrechi, 20 let spustia (Russian: Место встречи. 20 лет спустя) are commemorative documentaries on the two iconic Soviet TV series:
  - Seventeen Moments of Spring
  - The Meeting Place Cannot Be Changed, putting the history of the series' creation in the wider social context of both the plot and the production eras. Parfyonov interviewed members and acquaintances of the casts and crews as well as actual police and KGB operatives.
- Russia in Bloom (2013) (Russian: "Цвет нации") – a documentary about Sergey Prokudin-Gorsky, a pioneer in color photography of early 20th-century Russia. Available for public viewing with English subtitles on Vimeo.

== 2010 political censorship escapade ==
In November 2010 Parfyonov became the first recipient of the Listyev Prize, in honour of Vladislav Listyev, a Russian TV journalist who was murdered in 1995. On the live-broadcast ceremony for the prize, Parfyonov made an unexpected and emotional speech damning Russian TV community for dependence on the authorities, saying “journalists are not journalists at all but bureaucrats, following the logic of service and submission”. This became a contradiction to the past, when Parfyonov had refrained from making political statements, saying "I am a professional journalist, not a professional revolutionary. My job is to report, not to climb the barricades".

== Presence on YouTube ==
In February 2018, Parfyonov created a YouTube channel named Parfenon, where he publishes his documentaries and runs a weekly blog on "what has happened [to Parfyonov] during the week, what [he] saw, and what [he] thought about" as written in his channel's description. He later revived his TV show Namedni and started discussing the latest news. As of April 2020, his channel has 760 thousand subscribers and almost 50 million views.

== Awards ==
- TEFI award and also a special prize in 2004 – for the "Namedni 1961–2003"
- 4 more TEFI awards
