= TV Rain =

Independent television channel founded in Russia

Coordinates: 52°23′02.4″N 4°53′30.1″E

TV Rain Дождь
- Type: News, current affairs
- Broadcast area: Global (via YouTube)
- Headquarters: Moscow, Russia (2010–2022); Riga, Latvia (2022); Amsterdam, the Netherlands (2022–present)

Programming
- Languages: Russian; English
- Picture format: 576i (16:9 SDTV); 1080i (16:9 HDTV)

Ownership
- Owner: Natalya Sindeyeva
- Parent: TVR Studios B.V.
- Key people: Mark Ten (CEO); Tikhon Dzyadko (editor-in-chief)

History
- Founded: 21 April 2008; 18 years ago
- Launched: 27 April 2010; 16 years ago
- Founder: Natalya Sindeyeva

Links
- Webcast: Live stream
- Website: tvrain.tv

TV Rain (Russian: Дождь, romanized: Dozhd, IPA: [ˈdoʂtʲ]; stylized as ДО///ДЬ) is an independent Russian-language television channel. Launched in Russia in 2010, it has been based in the Netherlands since 2022. It focuses on news, discussions, culture, politics, business reports, and documentaries. TV Rain is owned by journalist Natalya Sindeyeva. Its slogan is "Optimistic Channel."

In March 2022, Russian authorities blocked access to TV Rain in response to its coverage of the Russian invasion of Ukraine. The channel relaunched from studios in Latvia in July, but after multiple alleged violations had its license cancelled in December. TV Rain continued to broadcast via YouTube and received a Dutch broadcast license in December 2022.

== History ==
=== Early years ===
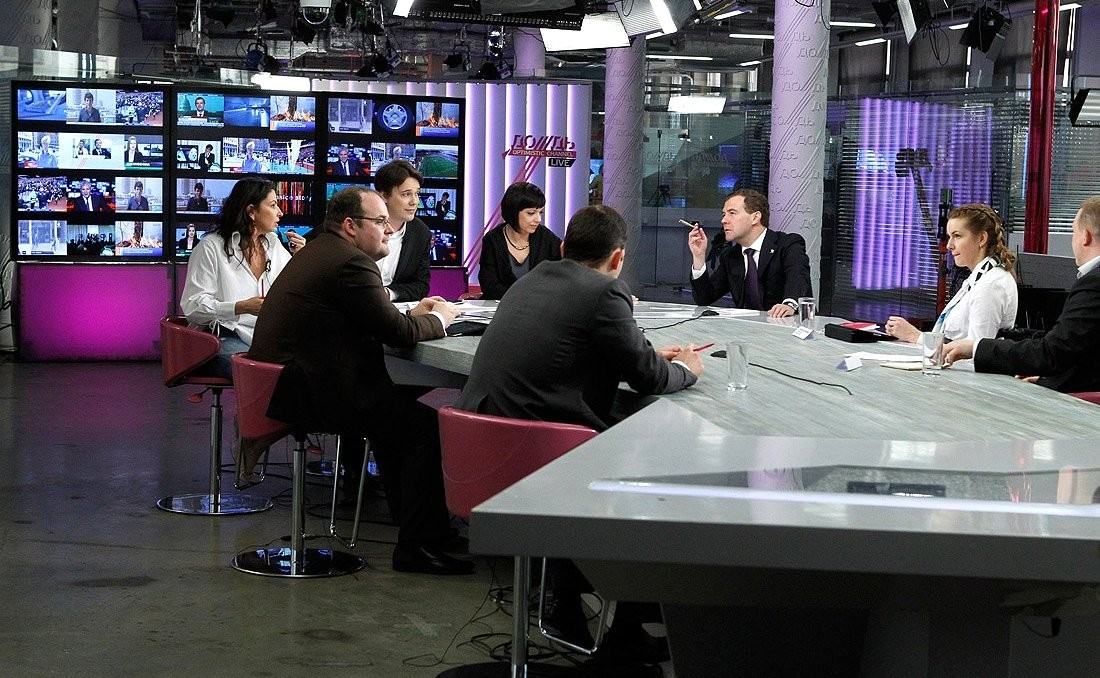
TV Rain news room hosting the channel founder Natalya Sindeyeva during a visit by then-President of Russia, Dmitry Medvedev in 2011

TV Rain was founded in 2010 by Natalya Sindeyeva, media entrepreneur and owner, and Vera Krichevskaya, a TV and documentary film director. It has focused on news, discussions, culture, politics, business reports, and documentaries. Most TV Rain shows have been live broadcasts with a motto to "talk about important things with those who are important to us".

TV Rain was one of the first channels in Russia to cover the 2011 Russian protests against the alleged rigging of the parliamentary elections. President Dmitry Medvedev was also noticed to have unfollowed TV Rain on Twitter. However, the channel was the first mass media outlet that he had chosen to follow on Twitter, according to an RIA Novosti report. On 9 December 2011, TV Rain was asked to provide copies of its coverage of the protests to check if it had abided by Russian media laws. By 10 December, it was showing a white ribbon, a symbol of the protests, by its on-screen logo. The station's owner, Sindeyeva, explained this as being a sign of "sincerity", rather than "propaganda", and an attempt to be "mediators" instead of simply journalists.

=== Siege of Leningrad controversy ===
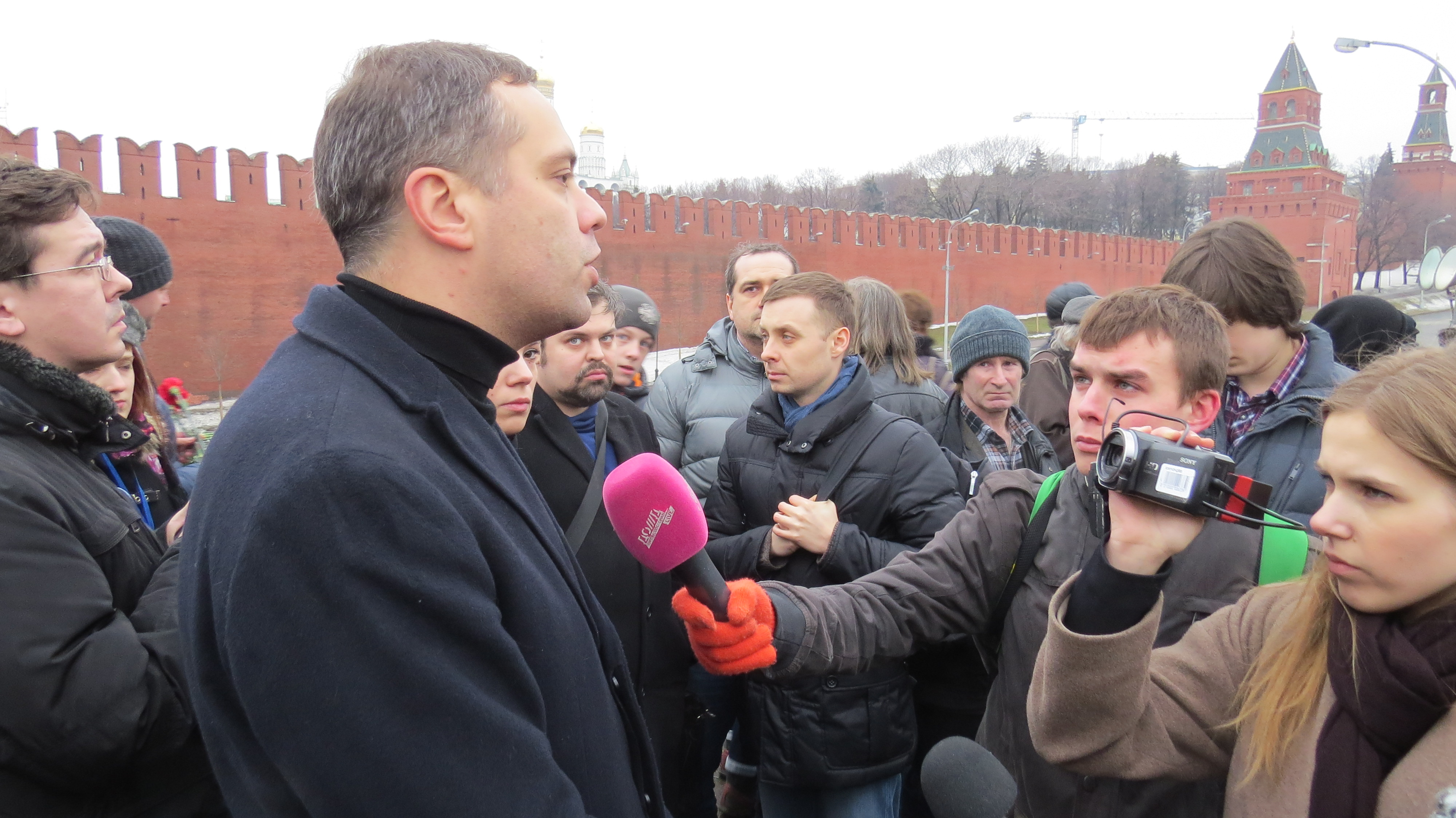
Vladimir Milov gives an interview to TV Rain at the site of the assassination of Boris Nemtsov in 2015

On 26 January 2014, TV Rain ran a poll on its website and on its live "Dilettantes" discussion program asking viewers if Leningrad should have been surrendered to the invading Nazi army in order to save hundreds of thousands of lives during the siege of Leningrad. Presenters cited Viktor Astafyev and compared it with the 1812 capture of vacant Moscow. Within 30 minutes, TV Rain removed the poll and apologized for incorrect wording. In the following days the channel was criticized by politicians, activists, State Duma members and Valentina Matvienko for its online poll on the Leningrad siege of World War II. Dmitry Peskov, Vladimir Putin's press secretary, also criticized the channel and said that they violated "more than a law". Yuri Pripachkin, President of the Cable Television Association of Russia (AKTR), said that he wanted "to take functions of censoring". In a resolution backed by the St. Petersburg legislature's deputies, Prosecutor General Yury Chaika was requested to "conduct an investigation into provocative material posted on [Dozhd] website … and, if just cause is found, take appropriate measures, including shutting down the channel." On 29 January, the largest Russian TV providers disconnected the channel. TV Rain was forced to move to a private apartment in October 2014. In November 2013, two months before the controversy, TV Rain broadcast a report by anti-corruption activist Alexei Navalny investigating high-ranking officials including Vyacheslav Volodin. The channel's owner, Natalya Sindeyeva, suggested that the program caused the campaign against the channel.

=== Foreign agent designation and suspension ===
On 20 August 2021, the Ministry of Justice of the Russian Federation added TV Rain, along with the investigative website Important Stories (iStories), into the list of "foreign agents". As stated by a representative of the Ministry of Justice of the Russian Federation at the meeting with the members of Presidential Council for Civil Society and Human Rights, the channel was designated as "foreign agent" by the request of Federal Service for Supervision of Communications, Information Technology and Mass Media due to distribution of materials prepared by media and individuals which were declared "foreign agents" that receive donations or funding from outside Russia earlier, such as Meduza, Current Time TV, Lev Ponomaryov, and Lyudmila Savitskaya. In response, Amnesty International criticized the move, stating that the authorities were "launching a campaign against independent media aimed at eradicating unbiased journalism and investigative reporting".

The Moscow Times reported that during the year-long prelude to the 2022 Russian invasion of Ukraine, the Russian government began to act against independent and critical media. In that period dozens of journalists and independent media agencies including TV Rain were designated as 'foreign agents' by the Russian authorities. The term foreign agent has Soviet-era undertones. Entities that are designated as foreign agents are obligated to disclose their sources of funding and have to label their publications including social media posts with the tag foreign agent. Violation of the obligation attracts fines.

On 24 February 2022, Russia launched a full-scale military invasion of Ukraine. On 1 March 2022, six days after the invasion began, the office of the Prosecutor-General of Russia ordered the country's censor, Roskomnadzor (arm of Russian government) to restrict access to TV Rain as well as Echo of Moscow due to their coverage of the invasion of Ukraine by Russian forces, claiming that they were spreading "deliberately false information about the actions of Russian military personnel" as well as "information calling for extremist activity" and "violence". On 2 March, TV Rain editor-in-chief Tikhon Dzyadko released a statement saying he and several other TV Rain workers had fled Russia, as "it became obvious that the personal safety of some of us is now under threat." On 3 March, TV Rain said it was temporarily suspending operations due to the forthcoming enactment of war censorship law, and towards the end of its final broadcast, the crew walked off-set and played Swan Lake in protest, in reference to the 1991 Soviet coup d'état attempt when channels could not report the news and instead played footage of the ballet.

=== Exile and ban in Latvia and Russia ===
On 6 June 2022, Latvia's media regulator, the National Electronic Mass Media Council (NEPLP), issued a broadcasting license to the channel. Tikhon Dzyadko stated on Twitter that the channel was going to broadcast not only from the Latvian capital, Riga, but also from several studios in the Netherlands, France and Georgia. According to Lyngsat.com, the channel reappeared on 2 June 2022 in a test format on the satellite Astra 5B and on its streaming website. On 18 July 2022, TV Rain resumed broadcasting from a studio in Riga. The channel's owner, Natalia Sindeeva, stated that the launch process would have several stages and would be finalized in autumn 2022.

On 1 December 2022, anchor Alexey Korostelev asked viewers to provide information about mobilization to publicize irregularities, saying: "We hope that we can help many service members, for example, with equipment and basic amenities at the front". The channel was criticized by Ukrainian activists over the statement, and Latvian Minister of Defence Artis Pabriks called on the channel to return to Russia. The next day, editor-in-chief Tikhon Dzyadko apologized, clarifying that the channel "has never been, is not, and will never be involved in assisting Russian armed forces with equipment" and stating that Korostelev had been fired. Three other employees, including hosts Margarita Lyutova and Vladimir Romensky, announced their departure from the channel over the firing. The same day the channel was fined 10,000 euros by the NEPLP for using a map which showed Russian-annexed Crimea as part of Russia and referring to the Russian Armed Forces as "our army", the second major violation for TV Rain in recent months, according to the Latvian regulator.

On 6 December 2022, the NEPLP decided to cancel the channel's broadcasting license, citing "threats to national security and public order". Latvia's State Security Service also urged authorities to bar Korostelev from entering the country and warned Dzyadko of potential "criminal liability in case of committing criminal offenses". Latvian Minister of Foreign Affairs Edgars Rinkēvičs defended the decision to initially allow TV Rain to operate in Latvia, but reminded that the channel has to comply with Latvian laws on the basis of which it was allowed to work there and therefore should be held responsible. Tikhon Dzyadko called the Latvian regulator's decision to cancel the channel's licence a "farce", "absurd" and "devoid of common sense", claiming that TV Rain was not allowed to appeal the decision, and affirmed the channel's staunch opposition to the war in Ukraine. CEO Natalya Sindeyeva apologized to Korostelev, calling it "disgraceful" that he was fired for a "mistake", asking him to rejoin the channel as well as Lyutova and Romensky.

Reporters Without Borders called on the Latvian regulator not to withdraw TV Rain's license. The Latvian Association of Journalists acknowledged TV Rain had "made a serious mistake", but believed the cancellation of licence was "disproportionate to the infringements committed". Russian-language news outlet Meduza, also based in Latvia, called the decision "unfair, wrong, and disproportionate to the official violations flagged by the agency" and called it "an incredible gift to the Russian authorities". Kremlin spokesman Dmitry Peskov said to reporters that "some always think that there is a place better than home, that there is always more freedom than at home. This is one of the clearest examples that shows that these are the wrong illusions".

In December 2022, Latvia's TV3 Group decided to evict TV Rain from its leased Riga studio in January 2023 in connection with channel's loss of license. However, the Latvian Office of Citizenship and Migration Affairs decided not to cancel employment visas issued to TV Rain employees. On 5 January 2023, the channel paid the 10,000 euro fine imposed by NEPLP, but appealed against the 4,000 euro fine that was imposed for not providing a language track in Latvian.

On 9 January, Dzyadko announced that the channel had received a broadcasting license in the Netherlands. The next day, the channel wrote that its editorial center would be moved to Amsterdam once its employees receive permission to work there and that it was appealing the NEPLP's decision to cancel its broadcasting license.

On 25 July, the Russian government branded the channel an "undesirable" organization and banned it from operating in Russia; the country's prosecutor's office accused TV Rain of distributing materials from “undesirable”, “extremist”, and “terrorist organizations”, as well as “foreign agents” such as Russian-language news website Meduza. The office also said the companies “discredit” Russian government bodies and law enforcement agencies, “disseminate false information” about the war in Ukraine, and support foreign agents.

In July 2025, a court in Latvia overturned the revocation of TV Rain's operating license in the country.

NEPLP chairman Ivars Āboliņš said the council would appeal the ruling and maintained that TV Rain would not return to Latvia. In August 2025, the NEPLP filed a cassation appeal with the Senate of the Supreme Court of Latvia, which accepted it for preliminary review on 19 August 2025.

=== Criminal prosecutions in Russia ===
In autumn 2025, Russian courts began criminal proceedings in absentia against several TV Rain journalists. In late September 2025, Moscow's Golovinsky District Court ordered the arrest in absentia of news director Ekaterina Kotrikadze and journalist Valeria Ratnikova on charges of spreading false information about the Russian Armed Forces. On 6 October 2025, the same court ordered the arrest in absentia of editor-in-chief Tikhon Dzyadko. He was charged with evading the obligations of a "foreign agent", later charged with spreading false information about the military, and placed on Russia's wanted list. On 16 February 2026, Kotrikadze was sentenced in absentia to eight years in prison for posts on her personal Telegram channel in spring 2022 about alleged war crimes by Russian troops in Ukraine.

In 2026, the prosecutions extended to the channel's management. Host Mikhail Fishman was arrested in absentia in the summer on charges of participating in an "undesirable organization", and his trial began at Moscow's Simonovsky District Court that autumn. In August 2026, Russian state news agency TASS reported a criminal case against Natalya Sindeyeva, chair of TV Rain's board, and Mark Ten, the channel's general director since April 2024. They were accused of organizing the activities of an undesirable organization, an offence punishable by two to six years in prison. On 9 September 2026, Moscow's Presnensky District Court ordered both arrested in absentia. Sindeyeva's trial in absentia opened at the same court on 28 October 2026. Prosecutors accused her of managing and raising funds for the channel and of broadcasting material that discredited Russian authorities and contained false information about the war in Ukraine. On 30 October 2026, Ten was sentenced in absentia to five years in a general-regime penal colony.

== Funding ==
Initially, TV Rain was planned as a niche television channel. Natalia Sindeeva invested her own money that she gained from the sale of a country house, to start the channel. Later, her husband, Russian banker Alexander Ivanovich Vinokurov, joined her as a co-investor. According to Forbes, by 2013, Vinokurov spent at least 15% of his 200 million dollars wealth on the channel. Although TV Rain became popular, Vinokurov mentioned that, in fact, it was unprofitable during its first years of broadcasting. As a result, in autumn 2011, Sindeeva and Vinokurov started looking for sponsors. Mikhail Prokhorov and Alisher Usmanov considered investing money in the channel, but eventually neither deal was finalized. As of 2013, advertising constituted about 80% of TV Rain's revenue. In the same year, the channel introduced a paid subscription: the cost of an annual subscription was 1,000 Russian rubles, access to live broadcast for one day or to one program in the channel's webarchive was available for 30 rubles.

In 2014, after the siege of Leningrad controversy, TV Rain was disconnected from Russian cable television. Consequently, the channel lost most of its audience and advertising revenue. While TV Rain's monthly budget was about 26 million rubles at the time, advertising brought only 6 million rubles a month. Trying to compensate the losses, the channel raised the price of an annual subscription from 1,000 to 4,800 rubles. In addition, TV Rain organized a telemarathon and thus raised funds for two months of operations. In the same year, the channel signed an advertising contract with the European Union. According to TV Rain's financial report, in 2014–2019, the contract generated from three (2014) up to 11 (2016) million rubles a year. In 2015, Boris Zimin's Sreda Foundation invested 7.5 million rubles to support the channel. In 2020, TV Rain's revenue was about 342.3 million rubles, and its net profit was 13.6 million rubles. As of 2021, the channel received income from advertising, paid subscriptions, donations, and sales of promotional goods in its online store.

== Awards ==
Natalya Sindeeva 2006

TV Rain received the following awards:

- TEFI (2011)
- Runet Prize (2013)
- Free Media Award (2014)
- Peabody Journalistic Integrity Award (2022)

The channel's journalists also received Redkollegia award six times. TV Rain's former editor-in-chief Mikhail Zygar was a recipient of the CPJ International Press Freedom Award.

== International availability ==
TV Rain website provides live broadcasting and archived programs. The channel is also broadcast on YouTube.

In January 2017, TV Rain was forced by the National Council of Television and Radio Broadcasting of Ukraine to stop broadcasting in the country. It was shut down because channel content implied Crimea was Russian territory. According to the channel's owner Natalya Sindeyeva, Russian law requires that media use maps that show Crimea as a part of Russia. Since its annexation by the Russian Federation, the status of Crimea is under dispute; Ukraine and the majority of the international community considers Crimea an integral part of Ukraine, while Russia considers Crimea an integral part of Russia. Ukraine has since moved to ban RTVI for similar reasons.

== Staff and programming ==
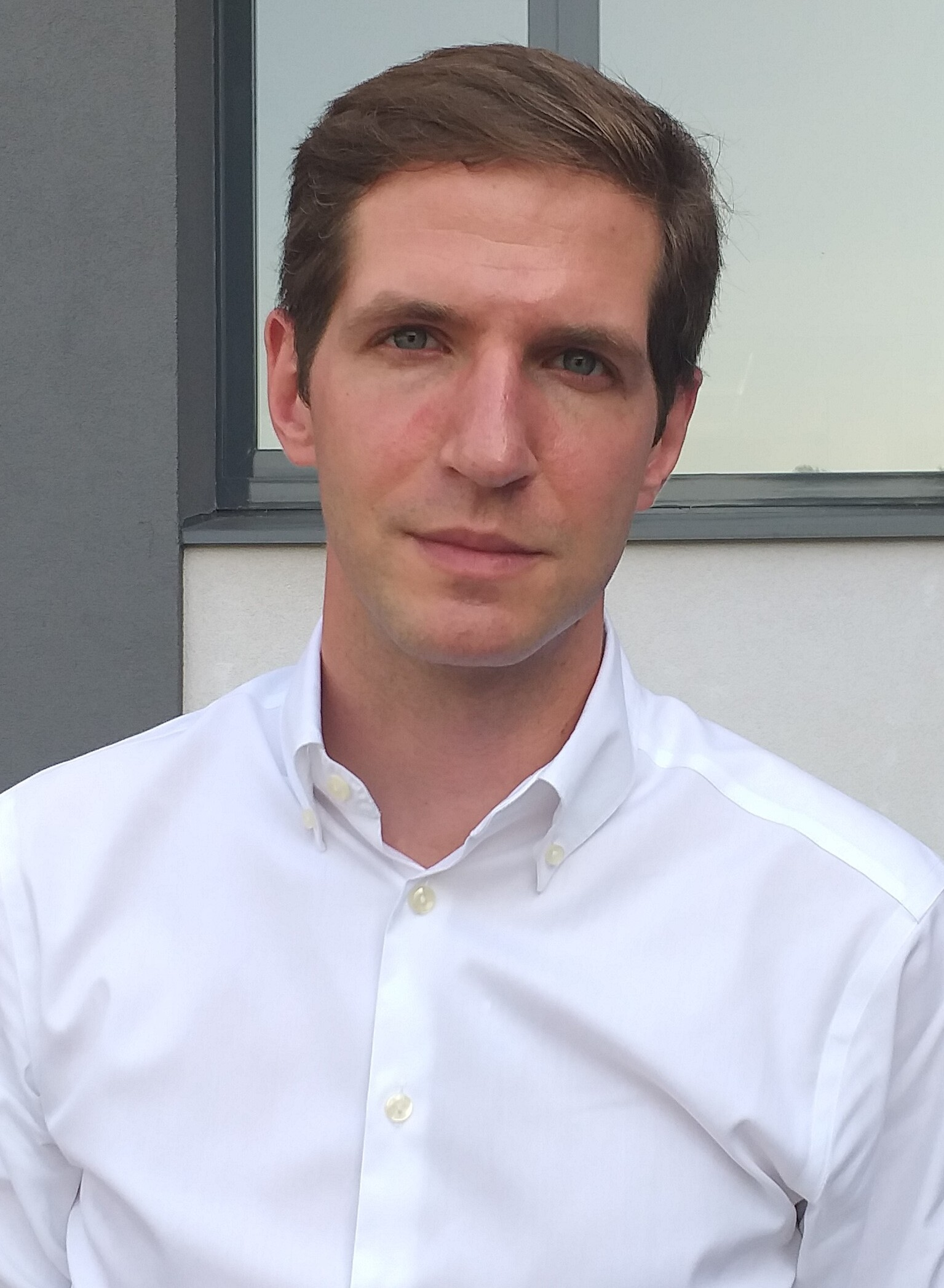
Current editor-in-chief, Tikhon Dzyadko

CEOs

- Natalya Sindeyeva (2010–2023)
- Mark Ten (2023–present)

Editors-in-chief

- Mikhail Zygar (2010–2015)
- Roman Badanin (2016–2017)
- Aleksandra Perepelova (2017–2019)
- Tikhon Dzyadko (2019–present)

Current journalists
(Moscow Time)

- Here and Now (daily news at 15:00 and 19:00) – Eduard Burmistrov, Tikhon Dzyadko, Denis Kataev, Ekaterina Kotrikadze, Nadezhda Metalnikova, Polina Milushkova, Anna Mongait, Valeria Ratnikova.
- Morning on TV Rain (weekdays at 10:00) – Eduard Burmistrov, Tikhon Dzyadko, Denis Kataev, Ekaterina Kotrikadze, Nadezhda Metalnikova, Polina Milushkova, Anna Mongait, Valeria Ratnikova.
- Kotrikadze of Foreign Affairs (Tuesdays at 17:00) – Ekaterina Kotrikadze.
- Nuances (Thursdays) – Yuliya Taratuta.
- And so on... (Fridays at 19:00) – Mikhail Fishman.
- How Everything Went Wrong – Mikhail Kozyrev.
- Memory Serves Well – Anna Nemzer.
- Women on Top – Anna Mongait.
- Report – Nigina Beroeva, Alina Didkovskaya, Ekaterina Fomina, Konstantin Goldenzweig, Valeria Kirsanova, Polina Milushkova, Michael Polenov, Valeria Ratnikova, Mikhail Shevelev, Aleksandra Shvedchenko.

Former journalists

- Here and Now – Yelena Khanga, Elena Pogrebizhskaya
- Report – Andrei Loshak, Farida Rustamova
- Fake News – Maria Borzunova, Maria Zholobova, Eduard Burmistrov, Ilya Shepelin
- Hard Day's Night (interviews) – Anton Zhelnov
- Money – Lev Parkhomenko, Vyacheslav Shiryaev, Artyom Torchinskiy, Margarita Lyutova, Stepan Danilov, Maya Nelyubina
- Sindeyeva – Natalya Sindeyeva
- Straight Line – Anna Nemzer, Anna Mongait, Kogershyn Sagieva, Lev Parkhomenko, Margarita Lyutova, Nadezhda Ivanitskaya, Stanislav Belkovsky, Victor Shenderovich
- Movchan – Andrey Movchan
- Parfenov-Posner – Leonid Parfyonov and Vladimir Posner
- Gosdep – Kseniya Sobchak
- Sobchak Live – Kseniya Sobchak, Ivan Golunov
- Citizen Poet – Dmitry Bykov, Mikhail Yefremov
- Prilepin – Zakhar Prilepin
- Breakfasts with Aliona Doletskaya – Aliona Doletskaya
- Zygar – Mikhail Zygar
- Kashin.Guru – Oleg Kashin
- Burden of News – Sergei Erzhenkov, Alexey Korostelev, Pavel Lobkov, Anna Mongait, Kogershyn Sagieva, Ksenia Sobchak, Oleg Yasakov
- It's Hard to be with God – Konstantin Eggert
- Panopticon (debates) – Anna Nemzer, Kogershyn Sagieva, Alexander Nevzorov, Stanislav Belkovsky, Vasily Utkin
- Speak (interviews) – Yuliya Taratuta
- Makeeva – Maria Makeeva
- Not Agreed Upon – Ilya Azar
- In What Sense? – Tatyana Felgenhauer
- Driving around the homeland – Sasha Filipenko

== In documentaries ==
In 2021, a full-length documentary film titled F@ck This Job was released. It was written and directed by Vera Krichevskaya, one of the founders of TV Rain. The film deals with work of the channel and its CEO Natalya Sindeyeva. The documentary was broadcast under its alternative title, Tango with Putin in the UK in March 2022 as part of the BBC documentary series, Storyville, about the history of TV Rain over 12 years and Sindeyeva's involvement in the station, was directed by Vera Krichevskaya, and released in 2021. The documentary had been due to receive its Moscow premiere and Russian distribution in early March 2022, which were cancelled due to bomb threats against the Moscow cinema, and new censorship rules following the Russian invasion of Ukraine. The documentary is available on Amazon Prime in the USA, under the title Tango with Putin, and on Apple TV, Google Play and other platforms in Europe.

In 2024, the documentary My Undesirable Friends: Part I — Last Air in Moscow was released, featuring real-time footage of how the staff of TV Rain, Echo of Moscow radio, and Novaya Gazeta coped with the government's suppression of freedom of speech.

== See also ==
- List of organizations nominated for the Nobel Peace Prize
- List of Russian-language television channels
- Meduza, another independent media outlet based in Riga that also publishes in Russian
- Silver Rain Radio, similarly named broadcaster also co-founded by Sindeyeva
