= Media freedom in Russia =

2025 World Press Freedom Index Good: 85–100 points Satisfactory: 70–85 points Problematic: 55–70 points Difficult: 40–55 points Very serious <40 points Not classified

The current government of Russia maintains laws and practices that make it difficult for directors of mass-media outlets to carry out independent policies. These laws and practices also hinder the ability of journalists to access sources of information and to work without outside pressure. Media inside Russia includes television and radio channels, periodicals, and Internet media, which according to the laws of the Russian Federation may be either state or private property.

As of 2023, Russia ranked 164 out of 180 countries in the Press Freedom Index compiled by Reporters Without Borders. Despite the constitution's provision of freedom of speech, the authorities possess significant discretion to suppress any speech, organization, or activity lacking official support due to ambiguous extremism laws. The government dominates the media landscape by controlling the majority of the national television networks, radio and print outlets, and media advertising market, either directly or through state-owned enterprises and friendly business magnates.

Multiple international organizations have criticized and continue to criticize various aspects of the contemporary press-freedom situation in Russia. The tenures of Russian president Vladimir Putin have led to increased censorship, including wartime restrictions of the Internet.

== Legislative framework ==
The Russian constitution provides for freedom of speech and press; however, government application of law, bureaucratic regulation, and politically motivated criminal investigations have forced the press to exercise self-censorship constraining its coverage of certain controversial issues, resulting in infringements of these rights. According to Human Rights Watch, the Russian government exerts control over civil society through selective implementation of the law, restriction, and censure.

=== Commissioner for Human Rights (ombudsman) ===
Russia's ombudsman, named officially the Commissioner for Human Rights, is appointed for a certain term by the Parliament. The ombudsman cannot be dismissed before the end of his term, and is not subordinate to any body of power, including the president or the government. Russia's 83 administrative regions have the right to elect a local ombudsman whose authority is limited to that region. Less than half have done so.

Russian Ombudsman Vladimir Lukin reported in 2006 that claims declaring that freedom of speech is non-existent in Russia would be an exaggeration, the constitutional right for speech freedom is basically observed, and there is no institutionalized censorship. Because the ombudsman has refused to acknowledge the barriers to free speech, journalists and publishers seldom appeal to the commissioner to protest restrictions of their right of seeking, receiving, transferring, publishing or distributing information. Disguised restrictions also exist to a considerable degree, mostly in the form of economic pressure on mass media by the authorities and loyal business. The so-called "self-censorship" which induces journalists to refrain from disseminating information which, in their opinion, may not please the authorities, is also widespread. In many places, the right to praise the authorities is ensured, while criticism is silenced.

In his 2008 annual report, Vladimir Lukin wrote that it is important to have a comprehensive legal interpretation of terms that may limit the freedom of thought and word. He spoke against the election legislation amendment, calling it "a practical prohibition" of contesting candidates' criticism and "obviously excessive". Lukin further criticized the Law on combating extremist activities, noting that extremism and dissent must be strictly legally divided and are not defined in the law.

== Attacks and threats against journalists ==
The dangers to journalists in Russia have been well known since the early 1990s but concern at the number of unsolved killings soared after Anna Politkovskaya's murder in Moscow on 7 October 2006. While international monitors spoke of several dozen deaths, some sources within Russia talked of over two hundred fatalities.

Remembrance Day of Journalists Killed in the Line of Duty in Russia is observed on 15 December every year.

=== Assaults on journalists ===
Since the early 1990s, a number of Russian reporters who have covered the situation in Chechnya, contentious stories on organized crime, state and administrative officials, and large businesses have been killed. According to the Committee to Protect Journalists, since 1992, 50 journalists have been murdered for their professional activity in Russia (which made it the third deadliest country for journalists in the 1992–2006 period): 33 journalists from 1993 to 2000, and 30 journalists from 2000 to 2025.

According to Glasnost Defence Foundation, there were 9 cases of suspicious deaths of journalists in 2006, as well as 59 assaults on journalists, and 12 attacks on editorial offices. In 2005, the list of all cases included 7 deaths, 63 assaults, 12 attacks on editorial offices, 23 incidents of censorship, 42 criminal prosecutions, 11 illegal layoffs, 47 cases of detention by militsiya, 382 lawsuits, 233 cases of obstruction, 23 closings of editorial offices, 10 evictions, 28 confiscations of printed production, 23 cases of stopping broadcasting, 38 refusals to distribute or print production, 25 acts of intimidation, and 344 other violations of Russian journalist rights.

On 7 October 2006, Russian journalist Anna Politkovskaya, known for her criticisms of Russia's actions in Chechnya and the pro-Russia Chechen government, was shot in the lobby of her apartment building. The death of Politkovskaya triggered an outcry of criticism of Russia in the Western media, with accusations that, at best, Vladimir Putin has failed to protect the country's new independent media.

The International Press Institute reports selective use of regulations, politically motivated criminal investigations, journalist imprisonments, outlet shutdowns and aggressive harassments by security services. According to the organization, Russia remains the most dangerous European country for journalists, with four killed in 2009.

Amnesty International reported in 2009, that "Human rights defenders, journalists and lawyers who spoke openly about human rights abuses faced threats and intimidation. The police appeared to be reluctant to investigate such threats and a climate of impunity for attacks on civil society activists prevailed." Amnesty International reported also a "climate of growing intolerance towards independent views". According to the Committee to Protect Journalists, Russia is a more dangerous place now than it was during the Cold War. Only Iraq and Algeria outrank it on the list of most life-threatening countries for the press.

In October 2016, a group of Chechen journalists published an anonymous, dramatic appeal in The Guardian describing the intimidation and physical attacks they are experiencing under the Ramzan Kadyrov government and complete control the officials are enforcing over the media organisations in the republic.

The Human Rights Committee of United Nations High Commissioner for Refugees is concerned about the contemporary situation in Russia,

at the alarming incidence of threats, violent assaults and murders of journalists and human rights defenders, which has created a climate of fear and a chilling effect on the media, including for those working in the North Caucasus, and regrets the lack of effective measures taken to protect the right to life and security of these persons.

- In August 2014 the Pskov-based publisher Lev Shlosberg, member of the opposition Yabloko party, suffered a serious attack that left him unconscious. He claims the attack was related to his paper's investigations on the deployment of Russian soldiers from Pskov to Ukraine.
- In August 2014 the investigative reporter Aleksandr Krutov was attacked and beaten in Saratov – the fourth time in his 20-year career in covering crime for a local publication.
- In September 2014 a TV crew reporting on fraud was attacked in Novosibirsk. Their equipment was destroyed and the videographer was injured.
- In December 2014, in Novosibirsk, the editor in chief of taiga.info was beaten by two men in the website premises.
- On 30 July 2018, Orkhan Dzhemal (son of Geydar Dzhemal), was killed along with film director Alexander Rastorguev and cameraman Kirill Radchenko in the Central African Republic while filming a documentary about the activities of illegal Russian military formations in the CAR.
- In June 2019, investigative journalist Ivan Golunov was arrested and allegedly beaten in custody
- In 2021, Roman Dobrokhotov left Russia after he was placed on a "wanted" list by FSB for alleged "illegal crossing of border".

=== Denial of entry and deportation of foreign journalists ===
- In February 2011, Guardian journalist Luke Harding, from Britain, was refused entry into Russia, contrary to OSCE regulations. He became the first foreign journalist to be expelled from Russia since the end of the Cold War. Some linked his expulsion with unflattering coverage of Russia, including speculation about Vladimir Putin's wealth. On 9 February Russia reversed the decision.
- In July 2014, the Ukrainian journalist Yevgeniy Agarkov (1+1 TV) was arrested in Voronezh while reporting on the trial of a Ukrainian prisoner of war. He was charged with missing proper accreditation, and was convicted, deported and banned for five years.
- In September 2014, a BBC team was attacked in Astrakhan while investigating the deaths of Russian soldiers in Ukraine – at the time still denied by the Kremlin. They had their equipment destroyed.
- In 2015, an Australian journalist, Helen Womack, who spent over 30 years reporting from Russia, was denied accreditation after listing on a nationalist-operated "list of enemies of Russia" website and forced to leave the country.
- Also in 2015, following the documentary on Russian soldiers serving in the war in Donbas, Simon Ostrovsky was denied accreditation to Russia.
- Wacław Radziwinowicz was expelled in December 2015.
- Thomas Nilsen, editor of The Barents Observer, was declared persona non grata in November 2016.
- Sarah Rainsford was banned from working in Russia in August 2021.
- Wall Street Journal reporter Evan Gershkovich was detained in Russia on 29 March 2023 by the FSB on charges of espionage. He is the first American journalist to be detained in Russia since the Cold War.

== Censorship and self-censorship ==
Article 29(5) of the Constitution of Russia states, "The freedom of the mass media shall be guaranteed. Censorship shall be prohibited." The World Report 2009 by Human Rights Watch said that the Russian government controlled over civil society through selective implementation of the law, media restrictions and harassment of activists and human rights defenders.

The Commissioner for Human Rights of the Council of Europe said in 2005 interview to Russian radio Ekho Moskvy that there was pressure on media from authorities in Russia's regions and the situation with the central media caused concerns, as many central TV stations were losing former independence. His conclusion was that the most important task in Russia was to protect the victories of the 1991 law on mass media, and to let journalists work fully independently. Yet, he concluded that with all the difficulties the Russian media were free as a whole, and that he was interviewed in a direct broadcast without censorship was evidence of some press freedom.

According to 2005 research conducted by the Russian Public Opinion Research Center (WCIOM), the number of Russians who approve of censorship on TV had grown from 63% to 82% in a year. However, sociologists believed that Russians were not voting in favor of press freedom suppression, but rather for expulsion of ethically doubtful material such as scenes of violence and sex (57% for restricting of violence and sex depiction on TV, 30% for ban of fraudulent businesses ads; and 24% for products for sex ads, and "criminal way of life propaganda" films).

According to journalist Maxim Kononenko, "People invent censorship for themselves, and what happens on some TV channels, some newspapers, happens not because Putin dials them and says: 'No, this mustn't go.' But because their bosses are fools." However, political scientist Yevgenia Albats, in interview with Eduard Steiner, has disputed this assertion: "Today the directors of the television channels and the newspapers are invited every Thursday into the Kremlin office of the deputy head of administration, Vladislav Surkov to learn what news should be presented, and where. Journalists are bought with enormous salaries. In discussions they tell us then how horrible it is to work in the state television service."

Since 2012, at the beginning of Vladimir Putin's third presidential term, numerous laws have been passed to make censorship and extensive surveillance easier. Such measures also led to self-censorship. A 2016 report by PEN America shows that limitations of freedom of expression in today's Russia do not affect only journalism and media, but the overall cultural space. According to the report, a confluence of laws aimed at contrasting terrorism and religious hatred and protecting children have led to an environment in which it is increasingly hard to distribute fiction, broadcast independent television and promote independent theatre and music productions. In addition, the selectivity and, at times, arbitrariness of Roskomnadzor, the Federal Service for Supervision of Communications, Information Technology, and Mass Media, create uncertainty for writers, authors, publishers and other media producers, which often results in self-censorship as a way to avoid uncertain rules and arbitrary enforcement.

Also, according to the 2016 Freedom House's report on freedom of the press, government officials frequently use the country's politicized and corrupt court system to harass journalists and bloggers who expose abuses by authorities. In the Russian legal system the definition of extremism is broad and this make possible for officials to invoke it to silence critical voices. Enforcement of such legal provisions has encouraged self-censorship in the country.

=== "Fake news" law and law on "disrespect for authorities" ===
In 2019 Russia introduced new regulation commonly called "fake news law" which criminalizes publications containing "unreliable" information" as well as opinions that show "disrespect for society, government, state symbols, the constitution and government institutions". The law was criticized for vague wording allowing selective application e.g. against political opposition.

In 2020, during the COVID-19 pandemic the Novaya Gazeta was fined 60,000 rubles under new "fake news" law for disputing the officially declared mortality statistics.

=== Prosecution of "extremist" content ===
In summer 2012, the Russian State Duma considered Bill 89417-6 which would create a blacklist of Internet sites including child pornography, drug-related material, and extremist material; as well as making providers of telecom services liable for such breaches. The bill was criticized as not being aimed at combating the causes of illegal content and its distribution through the internet, nor contribute to the effectiveness of law enforcement and prosecution of criminals, and its subjective criteria could allow Russian authorities to mass block internet resources with legal content. In December 2013, a law criminalizing "calls for separatism" was proposed. Under the law, violators face a fine of up to 306,700 rubles ($9,500) or jail terms of up to five years for making public calls for action aimed against the country's territorial integrity.

Since 2009, law enforcement agencies (most notably the FSB) have abused newly introduced anti-extremism laws to suppress freedom of speech, including corruption investigations. Publications and activities classified as "extremist" included protests against the court rulings in Bolotnaya Square case ("calling for illegal action") and criticism of overspending of local governor ("insult of the authorities") or publishing a poem in support of Ukraine ("inciting hatred") In 2015, the fines for "extremist" content were raised to a maximum of 1 million rubles ($19,000).

- In June 2015, Alexandr Byvshev, the poet whose works were previously banned as "extremist", was also listed on the official "list of terrorists and extremists" maintained by the Federal Financial Monitoring Service (Росфинмониторинг, Rosfinmonitoring) and a "spontaneous collective condemnation" campaign was started in his village described as Soviet-esque by independent media.
- Litvinenko's book Blowing Up Russia was also listed as an "extremist publication" and banned in 2015.
- In November 2015, just before the Holodomor anniversary in Ukraine, the articles of Raphael Lemkin, who coined the term genocide and used it to describe the Holodomor, were also added to the federal index of extremist materials in Russia.
- In February 2016, police in Saint Petersburg confiscated a whole print run of a book by Polish war-time author Jan Nowak-Jeziorański because of an allegedly "extremist content" (mentions of Nazi-Soviet collaboration during World War II).
- In 2017 an image of Putin as a "gay clown" was added as item 4071, as a result of a 2016 legal case against social media activist A. V. Tsvetkov.
- In October 2018 customs office in Saint Petersburg stopped a single copy of the book Future is History: How Totalitarianism Reclaimed Russia by Masha Gessen, ordered on Amazon by lawyer Sergey Golubok. DHL requested a declaration from Golubok that "the book does not contain extremist content" prior to delivery, and a few days later customs office requested him to certify that the book "does not spread specific views". The book is not sold in Russia, but it is also not in the register of extremist materials.
- Coordinated measures are being applied to films that do not follow Russia's currently preferred official version of historical events, including fiction and documentary movies. Preemptive "inspections" by the prosecutor general office, Ministry of Culture and other official organs, as well as not issuing a required "screening license", have been used to harass directors and block widespread shows of films such as The Death of Stalin, Holiday (Russian: Праздник) by Andrey Krassovski, Child 44, and Ordered to Forget.
- Doctors and medical personnel from Abinsk complaining about lack of overtime payments related to the COVID-19 crisis were accused of "carrying out extremist activities" by police.
- A Russian cover of the Dead Kennedys song "Kill the Poor" was deemed "extremist" and banned countrywide.
- A 1961 chemistry textbook was banned, as a chapter on synthesis of ketones was described by court as "undermining security of the country".

The Ministry of Justice maintains a list of "extremist materials" which are illegal to share.

Starting in 2021, Russia Today (RT) was increasingly involved in tracking any independent media outlets and singling them out as "foreign agents". RT relied on its own investigations and also on work of "patriotic" activists such as Alexander Ionov and Vitaly Borodin. RT is widely considered to be a purveyor of pro-government and pro-Putin propaganda rather than a legitimate news source and was created in 2013 by an executive order.

In September 2021 OCCRP declared it would cease work in Russia, as a significant number of journalists cooperating with OCCRP were harassed by the authorities.

The regulations about extremist content are applied selectively: in October 2021 the Republic news website was fined by Roscomnadzor for mentioning the Taliban without making a mandatory remark about its "banned terrorist organization", while at the same time state media agency Rossiya Segodnya sent out an internal memo to its reporters to discontinue adding the same remark to their news, which was described by editor of Republic as "introduction of two parallel legal realities".

=== References to the annexation of Crimea ===
After Russia took control of Crimea, the Russian parliament passed a law making it a criminal offense to question Russia's territorial integrity within what the government considers its borders. A man named Andrei Bubayev was jailed for two years for reposting a picture of a toothpaste tube with the words "squeeze Russia out of yourself" and an article under the headline "Crimea is Ukraine" by a controversial blogger, who is in jail now, calling for military aggression against Russia.

The Russian-language edition of the popular bestseller 21 Lessons for the 21st Century by Yuval Noah Harari, published in 2019, had references to the annexation of Crimea and Putin removed or replaced on the basis that they were fake news, and other references were also changed. The author said that he gave permission for these changes and said that he has allowed changes in other translations, as certain examples "could deter those audiences or spur censorship on the part of certain regimes".

=== Law Against Rehabilitation of Nazism ===
A number of people have been fined under a 2014 law against the "rehabilitation of Nazism" which includes criminalizing intentionally spreading what is deemed to be false information about the Soviet Union. Putin and other officials have talked about the need to counter the "rewriting of history", opposing interpretations that differ from official narratives.

=== Law on "educational activities" ===
In 2021 a new law was proposed to regulate "educational activities" (Russian: просветительская деятельность), which would require government license for any kind of educational activity, including public or private lectures, podcasts, video lectures etc. The proposal caused a large outcry from the scientific community, including a petition signed by nearly 250,000 people. Lawmaker Valentina Matviyenko defended the measures, explaining they "can be defined in different ways and very broadly", which was precisely why the law was so controversial. Critics pointed out that Russian law enforcement will stretch the meaning of the law beyond any common sense and use for the prosecution of free speech.

== Internet censorship and surveillance ==
Russia was found to engage in selective Internet filtering in the political and social areas; no evidence of filtering was found in the conflict/security and Internet tools areas by the OpenNet Initiative in December 2010. Russia was on the Reporters Without Borders list of countries under surveillance from 2010 to 2013 and was moved to the Internet Enemies list in 2014. On 31 March 2013, The New York Times reported that Russia was beginning 'Selectively Blocking [the] Internet'.

- Russia's System of Operational-Investigatory Measures (SORM) requires telecommunications operators to install hardware provided by the Federal Security Service (FSB). It allow the agency to unilaterally monitor users' communications metadata and content, including phone calls, email traffic and web browsing activity. Metadata can be obtained without a warrant. In 2014, the system was expanded to include social media platforms, and the Ministry of Communications ordered companies to install new equipment with deep packet inspection (DPI) capability. In 2015, the European Court for Human Rights found Russia's SORM surveillance legislation and practice in violation of the European Convention on Human Rights (Zakharov v. Russia).
- The Russian internet blacklist law (2012) faced criticism by major websites and NGOs on it launch. At the time of introduction the list was described as a means for the protection of children from harmful content; particularly content which glorifies drug usage, advocates suicide or describes suicide methods, or contain child pornography. In 2013 the blacklist law was amended with a clause to block content "suspected in extremism". It was expanded to include actions such as "calling for illegal meetings", "inciting hatred" and any other actions "violating the established order". During the 2014 annexation of Crimea by the Russian Federation, Roskomnadzor blocked a number of websites criticising Russian policy in Ukraine, including pages of Alexei Navalny, Garri Kasparov and Grani.ru. In July 2014, the online extremism law was used to prevent a march for Siberian autonomy. In subsequent years, it has been used to block caricatures of Vladimir Putin and LGBTQ content.
- The "Bloggers law" (2014), an amendment to existing anti-terrorism legislation, requires all web services to store the user data of Russian citizens on servers within the country. Sites which do not comply with this requirement may be added to the blacklist. Since August 2014, the law requires operators of free Wi-Fi hotspots (e.g. in restaurants, libraries, cafes etc.) to collect personal details of all users and identify them using passports.
- The "Yarovaya law" (2016) requires telecom operators to store recordings of phone conversations, text messages and users' internet traffic for up to 6 months, as well as metadata for up to 3 years. This data as well as "all other information necessary" is available to authorities on request and without a court order.

Social media platforms came under increased pressure in 2014. In April the founder of Vkontakte, Pavel Durov, announced he'd resign and leave the country due to FSB intimidation, after he refused to hand over the account data of Ukrainian activists. In September 2014 Vkontakte was taken over by mail.ru, owned by Kremlin-friendly businessman Alisher Usmanov.

- In 2004, Russia pressured Lithuania and in 2006 Sweden into shutting down the Kavkaz Center website, a site that supports creation of a Sharia state in North Caucasus and hosts videos on terrorist attacks on Russian forces in North Caucasus.
- Magomed Yevloyev, editor of Ingushetia.org, a vocal critic of the region's administration, was murdered in August 2008.
- Against the background of the December 2008 demonstrations in Vladivostok, it was reported by Kontury news website that FSB officers addressed moderators of the ru_auto Internet community with a request to remove stories about the Vladivostok protests. The major reason, as reported by a moderator of the resource, was that a number of repeating posts with the information about protests worsened some sort of statistics on people's attitudes. The moderator in question requested bloggers to publish only unique posts about protest actions.
- In December 2009, Internet provider Yota, with over 100,000 subscribers, blocked access to some Russian opposition Internet resources for its Moscow-based subscribers for a few days. The block occurred after the chief prosecutor of St. Petersburg recommended that the company block access to extremist resources. At the time, the only Internet resource listed as extremist by the Ministry of Justice of Russia was the site of Caucasian separatists Kavkaz Center. Since the evening of 6 December 2009, Yota opened access to all previously blocked resources, save for Kavkaz Center.
- On 5 April 2013, it was confirmed by a spokesperson for the Federal Service for Supervision of Communications, Information Technology and Mass Media that Wikipedia had been blacklisted over the article 'Cannabis Smoking' on Russian Wikipedia.
- On 7 August 2013, the Central District Court of the city of Tver, located 100 miles (roughly 160 km) northwest of Moscow, ruled that the official website of Jehovah's Witnesses should be banned throughout the Russian Federation. On 22 January 2014 the Regional Court of Tver ruled in favor of Jehovah's Witnesses and reversed the earlier ruling by the lower court. The Regional Court conducted a new trial, which concluded that the decision of the Central District Court was unjustified, since there was no legal reason to ban the site.

== Judicial prosecution of journalists and media outlets ==
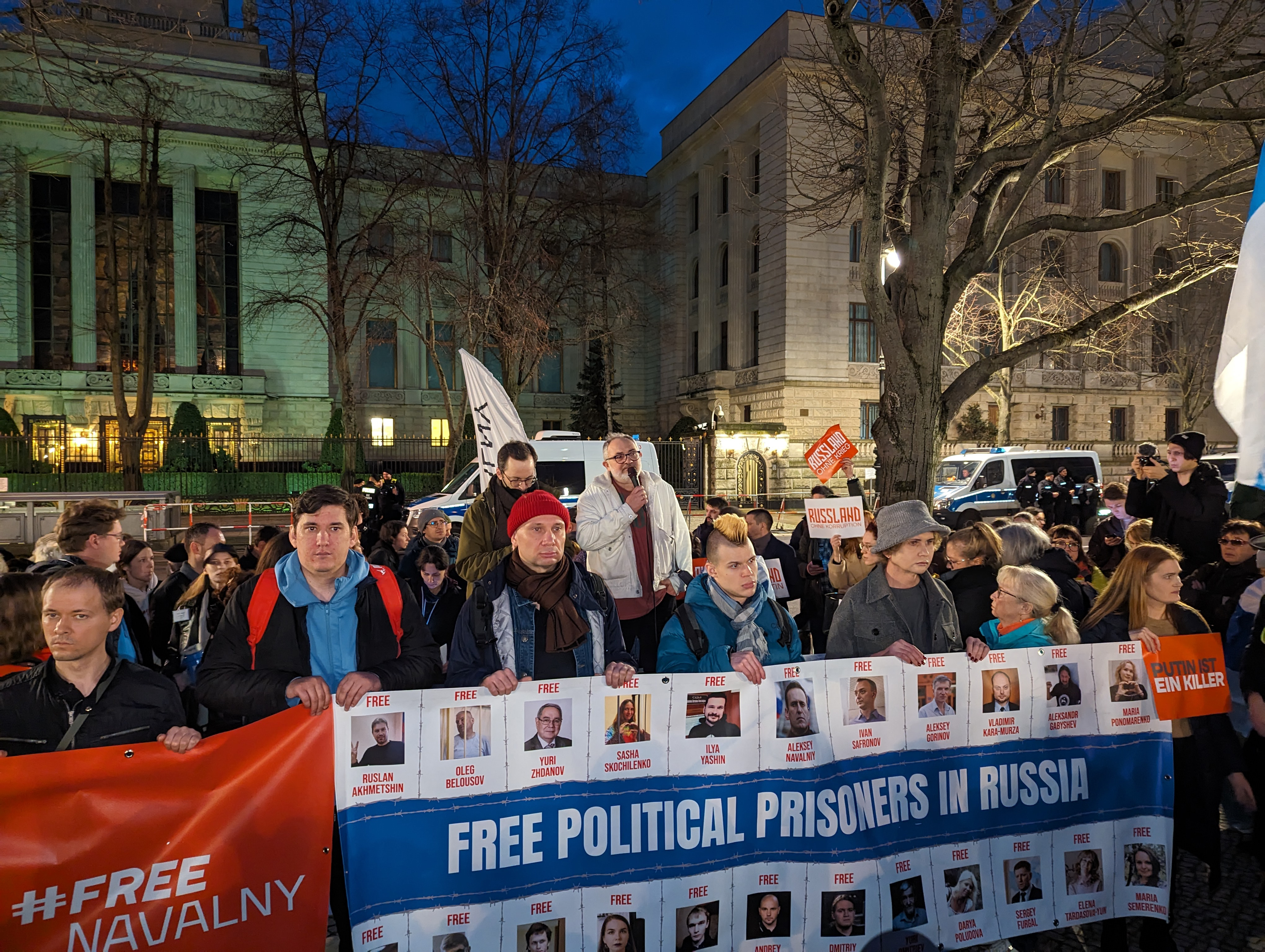
Protest outside the Russian Embassy in Berlin demanding the release of Russia's political prisoners, including journalists Ivan Safronov and Maria Ponomarenko, February 2024

Prosecutors in Russia have the custom of charging individuals – including journalists, bloggers, and whistle-blowers – with trumped-up criminal offenses including defamation, extremism, and other common criminal charges, as part of an effort to deter and limit their activities.

- In a three-year court case beginning in 2008, Chernovik, Dagestan's largest independent newspaper, saw its editor-in-chief Nadira Isayeva and several reporters prosecuted on charges of "inciting hatred toward law enforcement officials" following criticism of the Federal Security Service's counterinsurgency tactics. Reporters Without Borders, Committee to Protect Journalists, and ARTICLE 19 all protested the charges, and Isayeva was ultimately acquitted. She described the case as "a test for the institution of press freedom" in Dagestan.
- In November 2013 Rostov-na-Donu investigative journalist and blogger Sergey Reznik (often reporting on corruption and abuses by politicians) was sentenced to 1.5 years in jail on various charges, including insult to a governmental official. The jail term was upheld in appeal in April 2014. A new defamation case was open against him in July 2014.
- In January 2014 Aksana Panova, former chief editor of the Ura.ru website in Yekaterinburg, was given a two-year suspended sentence - including a ban on journalist activities - after being tried for extortion. She denied all charges, claiming to be targeted in retribution for critical coverage of local officials.
- In September 2015, the Siberian journalist and blogger Dmitriy Shipilov was arrested after he interviewed the organizers of a march for Siberian autonomy. The official reason included failure to serve a three-month sentence for "insulting a public official." Shipilov claims the detention is politically motivated.
- In October 2014, Rostov-na-Donu journalist Aleksandr Tolmachyov was convicted to 9 years of hard labor on extortion charges, after having already spent three years in pre-trial detention.

Judicial harassment of the blogger and politician Alexei Navalny continued in 2014. Navalny was fined $8,400 in April for defaming a Moscow city councillor on Twitter. In December he was sentenced to three and a half years (with suspended sentence) together with his brother Oleg Navalny upon fraud charges. Roskomnadzor warned four media that reported on the sentence and relied a video of Navalny calling for demonstration, accusing them of inciting extremism. On August 20, 2020, Navalny was poisoned and nearly died. The Russian government refused to open any investigation into the poisoning, which is suspected by many to have been carried out by government agents as retaliation for Navalny's investigations of political corruption and his activities in the Russian opposition movement.

Many Russian media outlets were forced to stop covering the Russian invasion of Ukraine because of new Russia's laws on "fake news". Leading speakers of several YouTube video blogs with large audiences have also become defendants in the "law on fakes". In particular, criminal cases were initiated against Maxim Katz of channel "Maxim Katz" and Anastasia Bryukhanova of channel "Objective".

- On 22 March 2022, television journalist Alexander Nevzorov was charged under Russia's "false information" law after he published information that Russian forces had shelled a maternity hospital in Mariupol.
- On 13 April 2022, Siberian journalist Mikhail Afanasyev, editor-in-chief of the online magazine Novy Fokus, was detained by the police for his reporting on Russian invasion of Ukraine. Afanasyev was twice awarded the Andrei Sakharov Prize "For Journalism as a Deed." He was sentenced to 5.5 years in prison in September 2023.
- In February 2023, journalist Maria Ponomarenko was sentenced to six years in prison for publishing information about the Mariupol theatre airstrike.
- In June 2023, Russian journalist Ilya Krasilshchik, former publisher of the independent news site Meduza, was sentenced in absentia to 8 years in prison for "spreading false information" about the Russian military. In August 2023, Russian authorities opened a criminal case against Russian-American journalist Masha Gessen on charges of spreading "false information" about the Russian army's actions in Ukraine. In December 2023, it was reported that Gessen was placed on the Russian Interior Ministry's online wanted list.
- On 4 October 2023, former Russian state TV employee Marina Ovsyannikova was sentenced in absentia to 8.5 years jail term for "spreading false information" about the Russian army.
- On 6 March 2024, Russian journalist Roman Ivanov was sentenced to 7 years in prison for spreading "fake news" about the Russian army. In March 2024, Russian authorities arrested six journalists working for independent Russian outlets, including Antonina Favorskaya, who worked for Sota.Vision and filmed the last video of Alexei Navalny before his death.
- In April 2024, Russian journalists Konstantin Gabov and Sergey Karelin, who had worked for Deutsche Welle and other international media in the past, were arrested by Russian authorities on charges of "extremism". Forbes Russia journalist Sergey Mingazov was arrested on charges of spreading "false information" about the Russian military.
- On 17 June 2024, a Moscow court issued arrest warrants for IStories editor-in-chief and award-winning investigative reporter Roman Anin and Ekaterina Fomina, a journalist at TV Rain and a former IStories correspondent, on charges of disseminating "false information" about the Russian armed forces. Russia's Interior Ministry added two Russian journalists in exile to its wanted list. Fomina said the arrest warrant would affect her professional life as she would not be able to travel to many countries that could arrest her and extradite her to Russia.

== Government ownership and control of media outlets ==
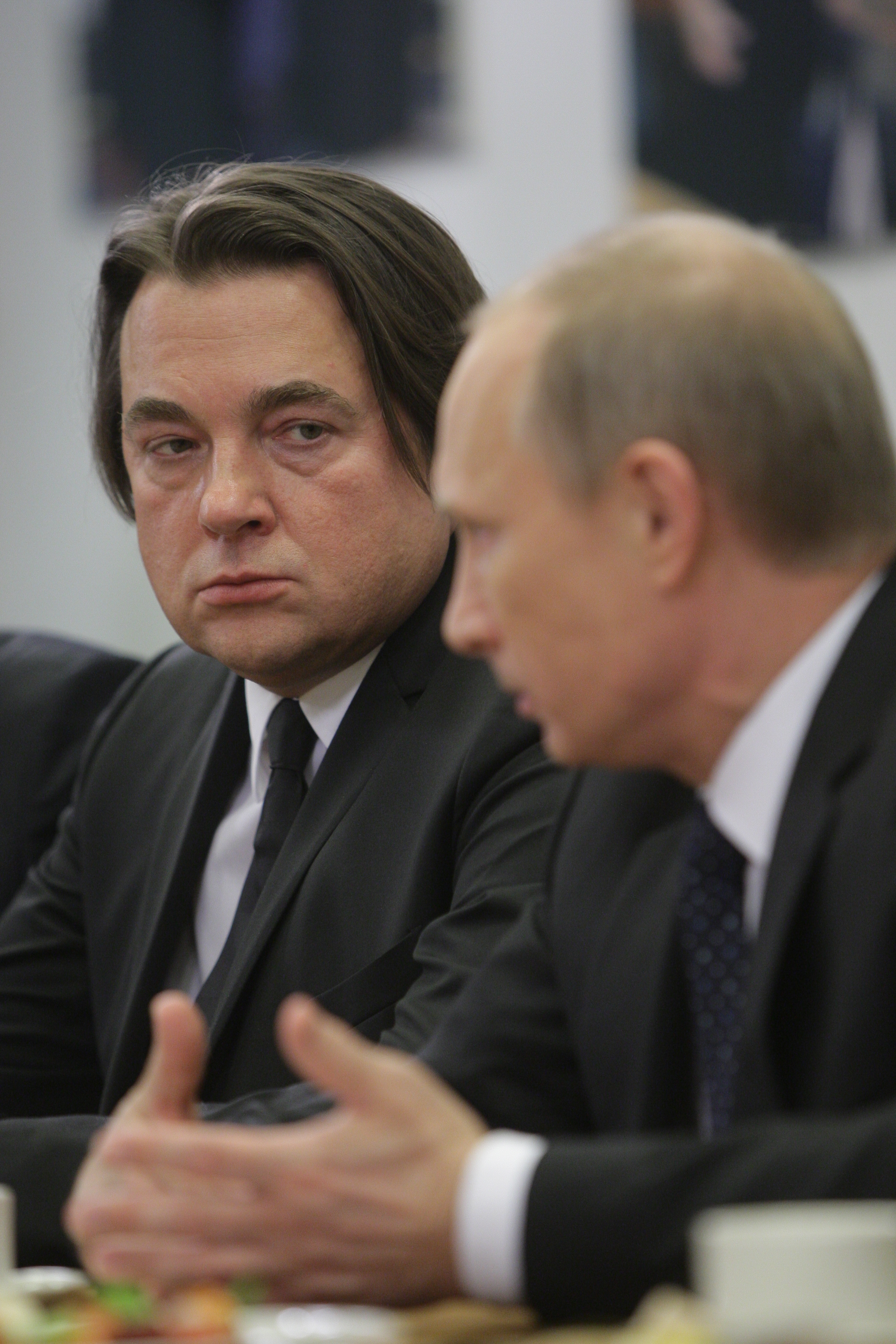
Putin and Konstantin Ernst, chief of Russia's main state-controlled TV station Channel One. About 85% of Russians get most of their information from Russian state media.

The government has been using direct ownership, or ownership by large private companies with government links, to control or influence major national media and regional media outlets, especially television. There were reports of self-censorship in the television and print media, particularly on issues critical of the government.

In a 2016 Mediastandart Foundation survey, most of the Russian journalists reported feeling that they are not free and independent, and believe that media owners undermine the independence of journalists. According to Alexey Kudrin, Russia's former Minister of Finance and current head of the Civil Initiative Committee, "in the regions, the number of independent media is progressively declining. The same happens on the federal level—major corporations and state institutions exercise influence on the media."

In the 15 years after 1990, most of the Russian print media underwent a change of ownership. Many of them disappeared, others changed owners repeatedly. After the new Law on Mass Media was adopted in 1991, the first stage of privatization of the media market followed. The term "oligarchs", including "media oligarchs", started to be used specifically in Russia indicating powerful businessmen close to political power. The latter made them the "chosen ones" in the redistribution of the country's wealth after the Soviet Union's dissolution. Since the election of Vladimir Putin in 1999, only oligarchs loyal to the government are able to maintain their control on strategic sectors of Russian economy and politic such as the information one.

Over 5 years between 2011 and 2016, the government forced changes of ownership in over 12 significant newsrooms with all-country reach, all of them previously associated with honest and independent reporting. RBC, Forbes, Russian Media Group, TV2, Russkaya Planeta, REN TV, Grani.ru, Lenta.ru, Rain TV, RIA Novosti, Gazeta.ru and Kommersant were suppressed or taken over using different techniques - some of them with government owned shares were completely disbanded and their resources passed to newly created bodies under control of state-approved managers (e.g. RIA Novosti, which became Russia Today), while Rain TV was forcibly removed from TV channels and only allowed to continue business as an Internet-only station.

All but one of the national TV channels are fully or partially owned by the state. The last channel – NTV – is owned by Gazprom, in which the state has a controlling stake. The situation in the radio market is similar. Major information channels are controlled in some capacity by the state.

As of 2009, the Russian government owns 60% of newspapers, and in whole or in part, all national television stations.

In 2008, the BBC stated that in recent years, companies with close links to the Government, state-owned Gazprom among them, have bought several of the most influential papers.

Concerning the IREX association Media Sustainability Index, in smaller cities, private independent media are often the only sources of local news, because local municipal newspapers publish only official information.

Russian antimonopoly regulation is still evolving, with many uncertainties and compliance challenges remaining. Many of the key provisions of the Competition Law are unclear and open to interpretation. For this reason, they require further interpretation by Russian courts.

Governmental control over media is also exercised through the distribution of state subsidies and advertising revenues.

=== Government control over the broadcast media ===
Observers have noted the loss of independence among national television stations. As of 2013, the three main federal channels, Channel One and Russia TV, and NTV, are controlled by the government, Channel One and Russia TV because they are completely or partially owned by the Rosimuschestvo (the Federal Agency for State Property Management), and NTV because it is owned by the state-controlled energy giant Gazprom.

Russia TV (Rossiya) covers 98.5% of the country's territory and is state-owned. Channel One (Pervyj Kanal) covers 98.8% of Russia's territory and has a shared state and private ownership (51% state- 49% private). However, most of the private shareholders include National Media Group (controlled by the structures of Yuri Kovalchuk, chairman of the Board of Rossiya Bank, one of the largest banks in Russia, and Vladimir Putin's personal friend; and Roman Abramovich, former owner of the Chelsea football club and Putin's ally). NTV covers 84% of the national territory.

According to the Committee to Protect Journalists, "All three major television networks are now in the hands of Kremlin loyalists." Indeed, while Rossiya TV (Channel Russia) was state-owned since its foundation in 1991, major shareholders of ORT and NTV (Boris Berezovsky and Vladimir Gusinsky, respectively) sold their stocks to the government and Gazprom in 2000–2001. Moreover, TV6, a media outlet owned by Berezovsky, was closed in 2002 using a legal loophole. In 2003 TVS channel which was formed mainly of former NTV and TV6 was closed due to financial problems.

Some networks attempt to operate with minimal government connection. There are private Russian TV networks with the broadcast cover reaching the majority of the Russia's population: REN TV (known for the daily analytical talk show with Tigran Keosayan, analytical news program "Week" with Marianna Maksimovskaya), TV Center (known for "Postscriptum" with Aleksey Pushkov, "Moment of Truth" with Andrey Karaulov), Petersburg - Channel 5.

Liberal opposition TV-Channel RTVi owned by Vladimir Gusinsky is not broadcast in Russia, but available in that country through networks of cable and satellite television, MMDS and IPTV networks. A former editor of a program on that channel, Vladimir Kara-Murza, believes it is the merit of the RTVi that the possibility of a third presidential term of Vladimir Putin was prevented, and that the "backdoor political technologists" were made to "abide to the Constitution, albeit with the Successor operation".

On 29 January 2014, the largest Russian TV providers, after key politicians expressed their discontent, disconnected TV Rain channel in response to a survey on its website and in live "Dilettants" discussing program. The survey asked if Leningrad should have been surrendered to the invading Nazi army in order to save hundreds of thousands of lives.

Top state television channels frequently apply self-censorship, avoiding any controversial topics that might impact the public image of the authorities. For example, massive truck drivers protests across the country were never even mentioned in the First Channel in spite of wide coverage in local and independent media and requests of the viewers.

The situation in the radio market is similar. Major information channels are in one way or another controlled by the state. Only four Russian radios broadcast political talk shows: Mayak, Radio Rossii, Vesti FM, and Ekho Moskvy. Mayak, Vesti FM and Radio Rossii are state-owned (Rosimushchestvo), while Ekho Moskvy is owned by the state-controlled Gazprom Media. A complete list of the audiovisual services in Russia can be found in the MAVISE Database, made by the European Audiovisual Observatory. Such list includes the ownership of TV channels and on-demand services.

==== Government control over print media ====
Kommersant-Vlast, Expert, and the New Times are weeklies that provide serious analysis of the current political issues. However, they are owned by oligarchs who openly support the government. Kommersant-Vlast is produced by Kommersant Publishing House that is owned by Alisher Usmanov. Expert is a part of Expert Media Holding that is owned by Oleg Deripaska's Basic Element and a Russian state corporation—Vnesheconombank.

==== Government control over web-sites ====
Most popular websites, if they are not internationally owned such as Google and Facebook, are state-owned or owned by influential businessmen such as Alexander Mamut and Alisher Usmanov.

=== Foreign media owners ===
A law signed in 2014 restricted foreign ownership stakes in any Russian media assets to 20% by early 2017. As a consequence, in 2015, the German Springer Publishing House sold the Russian edition of Forbes, and Finland's Sanoma sold its stakes in the business newspaper Vedomosti and the English-language publication, The Moscow Times. Russian media executives bought the stakes in both transactions. The Moscow Times subsequently switched from daily to weekly publication, and its chief editor resigned due to conflicts with the new owner. The new publisher of Forbes said that the magazine would carry fewer stories on politics and focus on business and economics.

==== "Black lists" controversy ====
As reported by Clifford J. Levy in a 2008 New York Times article, all Vladimir Putin's opponents are being made to vanish from Russian television. They are blacklisted and not allowed to appear in television shows. In one example, a presentation critical of Putin's policies has been digitally erased. This is the case of Boris Berezovsky and Vladimir Gusinsky, two powerful Russian oligarchs in the 1990s. Berezovsky had invested in the former public broadcaster ORT's first channel while Gusinsky, created Russia's first independent TV station, NTV. After Putin's power takeover, the media owned by Berezovsky and Gusinsky were the first victims of this "purge." Tax controls, raids by armed men, searches and arrests forced their bosses to flee the country and to sell their media outlets.

==== REN-TV and Channel 5 news ban controversy ====
On 16 October 2009, Kommersant newspaper reported that the owner of private television channels REN TV and Channel 5 had made changes to the managing structures of the channels. Referring to an anonymous source, Kommersant stated that as the result these channels would cease to broadcast independent news; instead, since 2010 they would receive the news from the state channel RT (known as Russia Today until 2009). As Kommersant wrote, "the Channel 5 and REN-TV are the only Russian TV channels today whose editorial policy is different than state news. Only through these channels opposition politicians are aired, as well as other events adversed by authorities are reported." However, the head of a REN-TV analytical news program Week Marianna Maksimovskaya was quoted by Kommersant as saying she held optimistic about the new executive director of REN-TV and sure that its editorial policy would not be altered.

On 19 October 2009, press secretary of REN-TV channel Nazarov asserted that REN-TV and Channel 5 will receive from the RT network "exclusively technological support", and the state channel will impose no influence on the informational part of the news.

On 22 October 2009, Alexander Orjonikize, a former head of REN-TV, and now CEO of National Media Group that owns TV channels in question, said that while the possibility of partnership in order to produce more saturated and interesting news is discussed, "it's important to note that whatever business strategy would be chosen in that direction, editorial policy regarding news and its informational contents will not be altered."

Channel 5 employs 1,700 people in Saint Petersburg. Its sales in 2009 accounted for US$20 million, while the expenditures exceeded 100 million. On 19 October 2009, employees of the TV channel published an open letter to the top Russian politicians, concerned over a possibility of mass dismissals. On 23 October 2009, CEO of NMG-TV Vladimir Khanumyan in an interview promised no mass dismissals will take place; he also commented that "Information about Russia Today is generally some misunderstanding. I don't even understand how could it be used in our project. It's the TV channel which makes programs for the abroad audience in English and Arab languages. How does that relate to Channel 5?"

==== RBC ====
In 2016, leadership and top journalists of RBC media holding left the company following an investigation launched by the authorities into an alleged "fraud", which was widely associated with the non-mainstream coverage of political affairs and the government, including the latest Panama Papers publications on the wealth of Vladimir Putin. One journalist described the situation as "having a strong resemblance to the takeover of NTV in the early 2000s".

=== Official stance towards the issues of state dominance ===
In 2000, prior to the presidential election, Kommersant published a long document titled "The Reform of the Administration of the President of the Russian Federation", allegedly leaked from the election committee of Vladimir Putin. The document proposed a number of changes to government information policy, including strict centralization of mass media and suppression of criticism from both media as well as from opposition in the Duma.

The document also offered a number of case studies and examples on how journalists or members of Duma exposing cases of corruption or suspicious purchases (e.g. foreign property) by members of the administration should be silenced with "preventive political actions", involving release of compromising personal details about the whistleblowers, journalists and protesters or organizing "spontaneous" counter-pickets in support of the administration. These methods were also applied to foreign journalists reporting from Russia and included ostensible surveillance, tapping of apartments and threats to relatives.

In 2006, President of Russia Vladimir Putin commented that in the period of 1990s freedom of press in Russia "was indeed under threat, not from the former state ideology that once held a monopoly on expression, but from the dictates of oligarchic capital". When asked about media freedom in 2006 interview with NBC TV channel, Putin replied: "We have more than 3,500 television and radio companies here in Russia and state participation in them is decreasing with every passing year. As for print media, there are more than 40,000 publications and we could not control them all even if we wanted to."

In 2007, a report by professor of politics Nicolai N. Petro asserted that foreign companies owned shares in over half of all Russian broadcasting companies and not the state. According to him, the Russian state's share in the newspaper and journal market is estimated to be less than 10%, while its share in electronic media is even smaller.

In May 2008, the International Federation of Journalists welcomed signs of a "fresh start" in relations between the authorities and independent media in Russia.

In November 2008, state of the nation address President of Russia Dmitry Medvedev acknowledged problems with the Russian media:

[A]s was the case 20 years ago, the bureaucracy still does not trust free citizens and free activity. This logic pushes it into dangerous conclusions and acts. The bureaucracy from time to time casts fear over the business world, pressuring it to keep in line and not to take what they consider wrong action, takes control of this or that media outlet, trying to stop it from saying what they consider the wrong thing, meddles in the electoral process, preventing the election of what they consider the wrong person, and puts pressure on the courts, stopping them from handing down what they consider the wrong verdict.

The policies adopted in that address answered that criticism the following way:

Ninth, parliamentary parties should have clear guarantees that their work will be covered by the state media. ... Tenth, freedom of speech should be backed up by technological innovation. Experience shows that it is practically of no use to persuade the bureaucrats to "leave the media in peace". Instead of persuading, we should work more actively to expand the free internet and digital television space. No bureaucrat can obstruct discussion on the internet or censor thousands of channels at once.

In May 2009, a Federal Law "On Guarantees of Equality of Parliamentary Parties in Covering their Activities by the National State-Owned TV and Radio Channels" was adopted.

In his 2009 State of the Nation Address Dmitry Medvedev recommended all regions of the Russian Federation to pass laws on guarantees of equal media coverage of activity of parties represented in regional parliaments.

Russian head of the Parliamentary Committee on Foreign Affairs Konstantin Kosachev said in a 2005 interview that there were no differences between freedom of speech in Russia and Western countries in regards to the printed media: "there is an enormous amount of newspapers which write any sort of stuff." Speaking of electronic media, he acknowledged that they were mainly under the control of the authorities, but added that that's not a specifically Russian phenomenon.

According to the BBC, the Russian newspaper market offers its consumers a more diverse range of views than those same consumers can sample on the country's leading television channels.

According to Vedomosti newspaper, in 2009 Rupert Murdoch's corporation failed to sell its three popular Russian radio stations because it didn't manage to find buyers for them.

In September 2024, in an interview with the Mongolian newspaper Onoodor, Vladimir Putin insisted that freedom of speech and freedom of the press were flourishing in Russia, saying "We are well aware of the need for pluralism and openness". Putin said the media is free in Russia, but journalists must obey the law.

== Coverage on Ukraine ==
The Russian military intervention in Ukraine and the occupation of Crimea, in 2014, led to a reinforcement of propaganda and disinformation from state-owned media outlets, including by alteration or misidentification of images, stories distortion (e.g. Crucified boy reportage) or invented from scratch. According to the war reporter Arkadiy Babchenko, Russian mass media played a significant role in actually starting the war in Donbas stating that "this is the first war in history started exclusively by Goebbels-like propaganda".

Independent coverage of war-related issues led to official pressures on media outlets. Lenta.ru was warned by Roskomnadzor in March 2014 after publishing an interview with a member of Right Sector; the following day the owner replaced the editor with a pro-governmental one, and 40 employees resigned in protest. In October 2014, Ekho Moskvy was warned by Roskomnadzor after airing first-hand testimonies of the fighting in eastern Ukraine, allegedly "justifying war crimes".

In March 2016 Sergey Shoygu when speaking at a Russian media prize ceremony described information in general as "yet another weapon, yet another unit of the Armed Forces. These weapons can be used for good or bad".

The Russian censorship apparatus Roskomnadzor ordered media organizations to delete stories that describe the 2022 Russian invasion of Ukraine as an "assault", "invasion", or a "declaration of war". Roskomnadzor launched an investigation against the Novaya Gazeta, Echo of Moscow, inoSMI, MediaZona, New Times, TV Rain, and other Russian media outlets for publishing "inaccurate information about the shelling of Ukrainian cities and civilian casualties in Ukraine as a result of the actions of the Russian Army". On 1 March 2022, Russian authorities blocked access to Echo of Moscow and TV Rain, Russia's last independent TV station, claiming that they were spreading "deliberately false information about the actions of Russian military personnel" as well as "information calling for extremist activity" and "violence". Additionally, Roskomnadzor threatened to block access to the Russian Wikipedia in Russia over the article "Вторжение России на Украину (2022)" ("Russia's invasion of Ukraine (2022)"), claiming that the article contains "illegally distributed information", including "reports about numerous casualties among service personnel of the Russian Federation and also the civilian population of Ukraine, including children".

On 4 March 2022, President Putin signed into law a bill introducing prison sentences of up to 15 years for those who publish "knowingly false information" about the Russian military and its operations, leading to some media outlets to stop reporting on Ukraine.

On 4 March 2022, Roskomnadzor blocked access to several foreign media outlets, including BBC News Russian, Voice of America, RFE/RL, Deutsche Welle and Meduza, as well as Facebook and Twitter.

Novaya Gazeta and its editor-in-chief Dmitry Muratov, TV Rain and its CEO Natalya Sindeyeva filed an application against Russia (No.11884/22) with the European Court of Human Rights. On 3 March 2022, Dmitry Muratov requested urgent interim measures, namely, to indicate to the Russian government not to interfere with lawful activity of Russian mass media, including Novaya Gazeta, covering the armed conflict on the territory of Ukraine, in particular, to refrain from blocking information items and materials containing opinions different from the official point of view of the Russian authorities; and to abstain from full blocking and termination of the activity of Russian mass media, including Novaya Gazeta. On 8 March 2022, the European Court of Human Rights indicated to the Russian government to abstain until further notice from actions and decisions aimed at full blocking and termination of the activities of Novaya Gazeta, and from other actions that in the current circumstances could deprive Novaya Gazeta of the enjoyment of its rights guaranteed by Article 10 of the European Convention on Human Rights.

On 5 April 2022, the Denis Diderot Committee launched a call for EU and EUTELSAT IGO sanctions against NTV Plus (Gazprom Media Holding) and Tricolor, two Russian pay-TV platforms operating on Eutelsat 36 E satellites arguing that 8 international news channels were cancelled of the offer in the context of the war in Ukraine.

== Political pressure on independent media ==
According to the World Press Freedom Review 2008 by International Press Institute, the pressure on Russian independent media outlets and their employees increased considerably in 2007. The government use variety of methods to control of broadcasters, to sideline critical journalists, and to intimidate them into self-censorship.

According to International Press Institute, even bolder publications have to curtail their coverage to avoid problems with the authorities.

Selective use of bureaucratic regulations were employed to inhibit media outlets, vague laws were passed to restrict independent activities, politically motivated criminal investigations against critics were used, independent journalists were imprisoned on trumped-up charges and their media outlets were closed, controlling interests in independent news outlets were purchased, aggressive harassment of journalists by security services took place and the failure to bring justice in the murders of journalists and in other violent attacks against the press prevailed.

In 2016, the PEN association concluded that using a combination of methods including taking control over large media companies and TV channels and selective and flexible usage of newly introduced laws, the government has acquired practical control over what is published in mass-media in Russia:

Although the press has not given in without a struggle and some key independent outlets, reporters, and editors continue to speak and publish, state television and a limited selection of other "loyal" outlets dominate today’s Russian media landscape. With the mainstream press increasingly toeing the Kremlin line, government restrictions have expanded to encroach upon other cultural spaces and modes of expression, including social activism, literature, art, and theater.

While there are provisions in the Russian Constitution that guarantee freedom of speech and specifically forbid censorship, the practical execution of numerous legal acts and dependence of courts results in practically unlimited control of the government over what is published and where. The laws in question are the anti-extremism laws, law on protection of children from harmful information, law on insult to religious believers, foreign agents law and undesirable organisations law. An important role in the censorship system is played by Roskomnadzor (Federal Service for Supervision in the Sphere of Telecom, Information Technologies and Mass Communications), an institution that- according to PEN- "has reawakened people’s internal editors – the voice in your head that consciously or unconsciously makes you question what you are writing or publishing: does this cross the line? Will this get me in trouble?"

According to an expert, the expulsion of competitive political actors from media ownership has gradually led to the depoliticisation of media content. Depoliticization of media content, however, led to its patriotisation as well.

=== Foreign agents law ===
On 25 November 2017, Putin signed into law new measures allowing authorities to list foreign media outlets as "foreign agents", comparing it to the U.S. Foreign Agents Registration Act requirement that forces Russia Today to register as a Russian foreign agent in the U.S. The law allows Moscow to force foreign media to brand their own news provided to Russians as the work of "foreign agents". The law started to be enforced on large scale in 2020 and 2021, when a number of media outlets have received orders to include large "foreign agent" statement in the beginning of their publications. The media has been chosen inconsistently from the point of view of the law, which lists foreign financing and political activity as primary criteria — some media that fall within these criteria have not received orders (these were pro-Kremlin media), while some organisations like Memorial that do not engage in political activity were designated as "foreign agents". Most notable independent media that received orders were Meduza and TV Rain, even though their "foreign funding" was limited to advertising contracts.

=== Selective use of regulations and criminal investigations ===
As stated by IPI, the Russian Government use selectively politicized regulations and bureaucratic harassment to inhibit media outlets. Main legal tools used here are anti-extremism laws (described above) and foreign agents law.

In 2008, Amnesty International criticized the run-up to parliamentary and presidential elections as "a clampdown on the freedoms of assembly and expression", stating that "the authorities have violently dispersed some opposition demonstrations, while pro-government events have gone ahead without interference."

In 2015, PolitPress initiated a database of various forms of repression applied to journalists and activists in Russia, counting overall 302 of those subject to various forms of repression, including 17 journalists. Memorial has published a list of political prisoners in Russia, that also includes journalists.

== Access to information and open data ==
Russia's Law on Providing Access to Information on the Activities of State Bodies and Bodies of Local Self-Government, was enacted by the lower house of the legislature (State Duma) on 21 January 2009. The law positively guarantees the rights of Russian citizens to request and receive information, outlines a procedure for such requests, and determines government responsibility for providing such information. Such adoption was welcomed by the Human Rights Committee of United Nations in 2009.

However, even if the right to information is also legally guaranteed in Russia by the first Article of the Russian Law on Mass Media (27 December 1991) and by Article 29 of the 1993 Constitution, the realm of information is characterized by secrecy rather than openness. The Law on Mass Media assigns a direct right to receive information only to mass media, while Russian citizens have the right to receive reliable information on the state activities and representatives via the mass media (Art. 38.1). State officials, in turn, are obliged to inform the media about their activities: on demand, but also actively.

According to the Global Right to Information Rating (GRIR), the Russian legal framework (including jurisprudence) does not recognise a fundamental right of access to information. The GRIR appointed score 1 to Russia, where 6 is the maximum possible score with regard to the right to access information. However, when considered together with the scope and the requesting procedures provided by the Russian Freedom of Information Act (FOIA), the GRIR assigned Russia a total score of 98, out of the maximum score of 150. The Penal Code (Art. 144) fixes high penalties for unlawful refusal of information and for hindering the professional activity of journalists. The right to access public information is particularly undermined by the legal exception valid for refusing the information's disclosure, namely the category of "confidential information" (commercial, state, or military secrets) is open to wide interpretations. The Law "on state secrets" was adopted on 21 July 1993 (amended in October 1997). In addition to a list of categories of information that could be classified as state secrets, the President of Russia can elaborate and approve such list through the publication of a public decree.

Svetlana Mironyuk commented to Vasily Gatov that Russian media since the early 2000s is divided into three groups: outsiders, our guys, and in-betweeners.

- "Outsiders." Vedomosti, Kommersant, Forbes, Novaya Gazeta, Lenta.ru (until March 2014), TV Rain, The Moscow Times, and others. These have a more Western media approach to covering events. These media sources are outside the official Kremlin viewpoint.
- "Our guys." Komsomolskaya Pravda, Russia-24, VGTRK, and the Aram Gabrelyanov media family — Zhizn, Lifenews.ru and Izvestia. This group can access exclusive interviews of Kremlin officials but the Kremlin expects certain "services" in return. To keep this group inline, it is up to several central figures such as Alexei Gromov and Mikhail Lesin, who began the task, and later they were joined by first Vladislav Surkov, and then his replacement Vyacheslav Volodin. To replace the Kremlin handlers, special yellow telephones, which are "media hotlines" to the Kremlin, have been installed on the "Our guys" editors desks since the mid-2000s.
- "In-betweeners." the commercial radio station Ekho Moskvy (majority owned by Gazprom-Media) and the Interfax news agency may not always have access to Kremlin authorities, but occasionally can have a story.

In 2015, the FSB (Federal Security Service of the Russian Federation), the principal security agency of Russia, proposed a new regulation that will restrict access to public property registers, that were previously frequently used by whistle-blowers to expose multimillion-dollar mansions belonging to public officials who could not afford them from their official salary. The regulation was proposed shortly after the media exposed an undeclared mansion belonging to FSB vice-director Sergey Smirnov using the public registers. In the same year, a group of deputies proposed a new law that would penalize "anti-Russian" or "anti-patriotic" statements. The law was criticized as unconstitutional and vague due to lack of definition of what these terms would really mean.

Another regulation enacted in 2015 is based on the European right to be forgotten concept, but without any of the safeguards for the public interest and freedom of speech. According to some experts, the regulation's scope is to silence publications about specific corrupted politicians, even if the accusations were true and confirmed in courts. Public land registers were also anonymized to hide names of property owners after they were frequently used by watchdogs to question unexplainable wealth of public officers.

In 2015, the non-profit association RosOtvet, launched an online service to facilitate requests for information to authorities.

=== Open data and proactive disclosure ===
Beyond the duty to disclose public information upon request, public authorities in Russia have an affirmative obligation to publish information (i.e. proactive disclosure). Such information consists in:

- Full and brief official names of the government body, postal address, email for requests/messages from citizens, reference phone numbers - usually published and actualized information on powers and competence;
- Information on head officials (full names, other information - upon agreement);
- Official symbols;
- Approved forms (templates) for applications and other documents acceptable for review by the government body;
- Information on services provided by the government body in the field of licensing works performed abroad and using information containing state secret;
- Procedure for entering state service in the government body;
- Procedure for submission and review of applications from individuals and organizations Procedure, address, and schedule for reception of individuals and organizations;
- Name of the government body's structure department in charge of reception, contact data (email, reference phones).

Proactive disclosure of information by public bodies is provided by a series of laws, many of them aimed at contrasting corruption. One of them is the Russian Federation Federal Law "On providing access to information on the activities of state bodies and local governments", adopted by the State Duma on 21 January 2009.

The Russian legislation provides several ways for government bodies to publish their open data: it can be done through the federal Open Data Portal (data.gov.ru), dedicating a section on a government body's own official website or on a special open data portal, regional or municipal.

In 2016, the association Infometer has audited open data of 166 websites belonging to administrations of the largest Russian cities, those populated over 100,000. This study revealed that most cities' administrations do not publish open data:

- most of those publishing open data do it at their own resources that is not always the best solution;
- quite few city administrations approve normative acts regarding open data;
- the very few city administrations work with the community of open data software developers.

73 out of the 166 cities under survey do publish open data. They observe the requirements on open data publication for 47.9%.

Infometer, from July to October 2014, made an audit of compliance of various level courts' official websites with the Federal Law "On Providing Access to Information on the Activities of Courts in the Russian Federation" No. 262-FZ from 22 Dec 2008. The experts focused on the openness of information on Russian general jurisdiction courts' activities, focusing on online publication of templates for documents used for filing applications to courts. The results showed that, with regard to the Supreme Court of Russia, information is available at 24.1%. Referring to Regional Court, out of the 85 examined their openness level appears to be 42.4%. Finally, with regard to First Instance courts, their openness was 31%.

With regard to open data, as to 2015 the Infometer association calculated that 69 Russian regions publish open data and for 36.6% at average regions observe requirements for open data publication. Most of these open data are published in the governmental field.

== See also ==
- Human rights in Russia
- Mat (Russian profanity) § Legal issues
- List of journalists killed in Russia
- List of websites blocked in Russia
- Media freedom in the United States
- Media of Russia
- Political repression of cyber-dissidents § Russia
- Russian Internet blacklist
- Telecommunications in Russia
