= Kolpakov =

Kolpakov (Russian: Колпаков), or Kolpakova (feminine; Колпакова) is a Russian surname that may refer to:

- Georgi Kolpakov (born 1979), a Russian professional footballer
- Irina Kolpakova (born 1933), Russian ballerina
- Ivan Kolpakov (born 1983), Russian journalist
- Sasha Kolpakov (born 1943), Romani musician and composer from Russia
- Serafim Kolpakov (1933–2011), Soviet engineer and politician
- Tatyana Kolpakova (born 1959), Soviet long jumper
- Vitaliy Kolpakov (born 1972), Ukrainian athlete
