= Ivan Kolpakov =

Russian journalist and writer

- Иван Колпаков
- Born: December 17, 1983; Perm (Soviet Union)
- Education: Perm State University, University of Oxford
- Occupations: Journalist, editing staff, writer
- Employer: Meduza (2016–)

Ivan Sergeyevich Kolpakov (Russian: Иван Сергеевич Колпаков; born December 17, 1983) is a Russian journalist, writer, one of the founders of the Sol (Russian: Соль, lit. 'Salt') newspaper, editor-in-chief of the Meduza newspaper from 2016 to 2018 and since March 2019.

== Biography ==
Ivan Kolpakov was born in 1983 in Perm, Russia. In 2005 he graduated from the Faculty of History and Politics of Perm State University (PSU).

In 2006 he led an expedition of the PSU on excavations in Chersonesos on the shore of the Black Sea. In 2006, he trained at University of Oxford. In the same place, in 2012, he gave a series of lectures on the situation in the Russian media.

In 2008, with Alena Danilkina, he opened a business agency Workshop, specializing in public relations for culture and business. In early 2010, together with the Russian collector Marat Gelman and the Russian journalist Ivan Davydov, he founded the Internet publication Sol and became its editor-in-chief. The newspaper closed in 2011.

From 2012 to 2014, Kolpakov lived in Moscow and was the head of the special correspondents department in the Lenta.ru online media.

In October 2014 he moved to Riga, Latvia to become the deputy editor-in-chief of the media project Meduza. In 2016, the founder and editor-in-chief of Meduza, former editor of Lenta.ru, Galina Timchenko, appointed Kolpakov to the position of editor-in-chief, remaining the general director of the publication. In November 2018, Kolpakov left Meduza by his own decision.

In 2017, Kolpakov was a panelist at the International Symposium on Online Journalism.

== Sex scandal ==
On October 20, 2018, Kolpakov was accused to have groped the wife of a colleague at a party in honour of the publication's birthday. This received a great response in the media, and Kolpakov was suspended from work for two weeks. On November 6, Meduza's board of directors decided to return him to his workplace. The information drew criticism from readers. As a result, after several days of work, on November 9, Kolpakov himself decided to resign.

At the beginning of 2019, it became known that, despite the dismissal, Kolpakov continues to cooperate with the editorial office and may soon officially return to a leadership position (presumably as a publisher). This information was confirmed by Galina Timchenko. Kolpakov was re-appointed editor-in-chief of Meduza on March 11, 2019.

== Books ==
- Ivan Kolpakov, Surf (Russian: Сёрф), — Perm, Russia; PH Companion, 2007 — ISBN 978-5-902372-09-7
- Galina Timchenko, Anton Nossik, Ivan Kolpakov, Dear editors. The true story of "Lenta.ru", told by its creators (Russian: Дорогая редакция. Подлинная история «Ленты.ру», рассказанная её создателями), — Moscow: ACT, Времена 2, 2014. — 336 pages — ISBN 978-5-17-086970-1
- Ivan Kolpakov, We lost (Russian: Мы проиграли), — Moscow: ACT, Lenta.ru, 2015 — ISBN 978-5-17-088266-3
