= Dmitry Kolezev =

Russian journalist

- Дмитрий Колезев
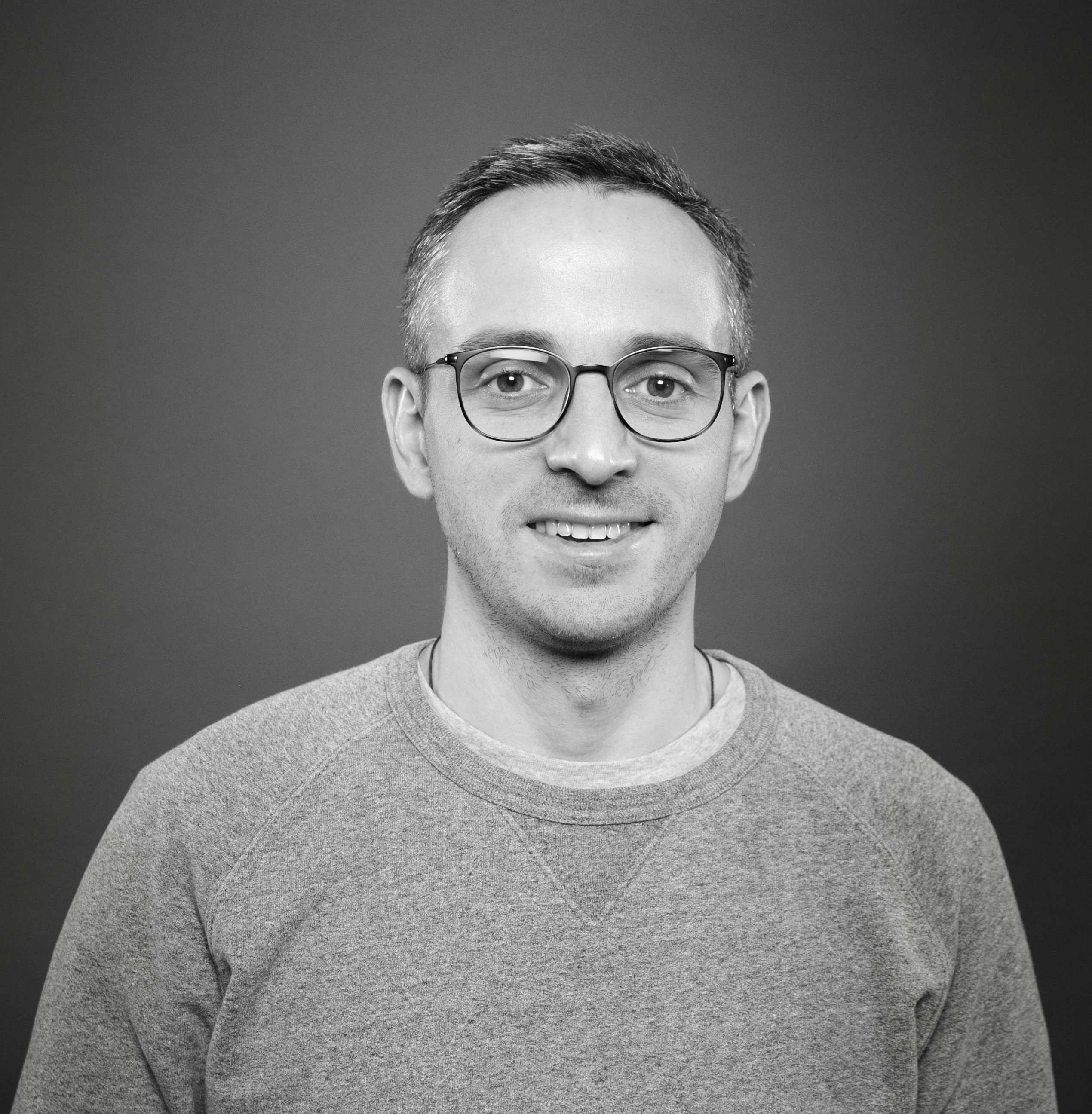
- Born: 14 December 1984 (age 41); Kamensk-Uralsky
- Occupation: journalist
- Website: kolezev.ru

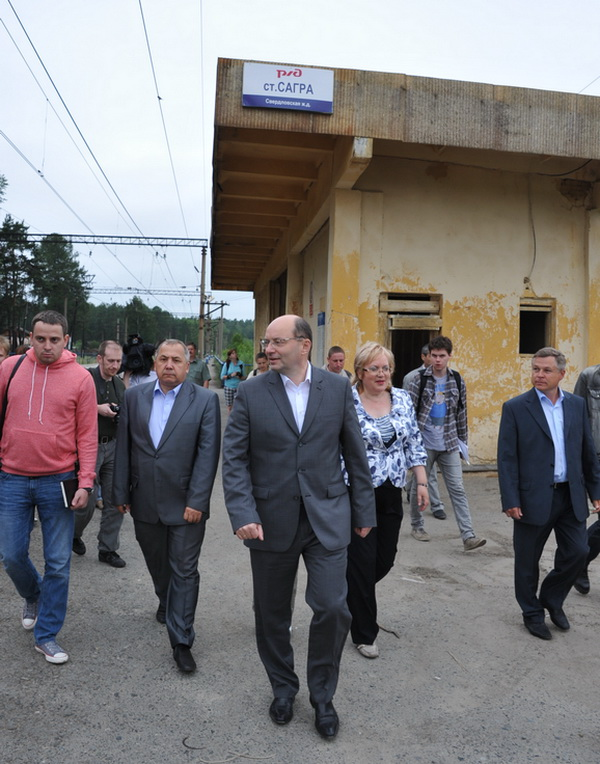
Dmitry Kolezev (leftmost) accompanies Governor of Sverdlovsk Oblast Alexander Misharin while visiting Sagra settlement as journalist of Ura.ru

Dmitry Evgenievich Kolezev (Russian: Дмитрий Евгеньевич Колезев; born 14 December 1984) is a Russian journalist from the region called the Urals, known internationally for his work in independent online mass media, primarily dedicated to life in this region. He is particularly known for his criticism of the Russian authorities. His current position is as the head of the online magazine It's My City, dedicated to Yekaterinburg. Kolezev previously served as a leading journalist at Znak.com and Ura.ru, both also based in Yekaterinburg.

== Biography ==
Dmitry Kolezev was born in Kamensk-Uralsky, graduated from School №9 in Ekaterinburg and later from Faculty of Journalism of Ural State University. Upon graduation, he worked at Uralpolit.ru, a news website currently belonging to FederalPress media holding, later at popular 2006-founded Ura.ru news website and subsequently at popular Znak.com news website which he co-founded and developed for 8 years. All these websites focus on events in Ural region and its surroundings: mainly this is related to territories included in Ural Federal District, but there may also be content from the neighboring Perm Krai and also from Moscow, Saint Petersburg and the rest of Russia, as the websites are considered to develop country-wide notability.

While working at Ura.ru, he was a leading columnist along with another leading one, Mikhail Vyugin. On 29 November 2012, the journalistic collective got split up, as Vyugin declared overtake of Ura.ru in his favor on political and economical grounds following scandals related to actions of Ura.ru's founder Aksana Panova. She was suspected in fraud related to coverage of local political events and illegal financial operations, was found guilty by court and was temporarily banned by court from journalistic activities.

Following the split, Panova and Kolezev co-created new Znak.com website in 2012 to continue their journalistic work and are considered to be successful, while Ura.ru also continued to work as intended. While Panova was under court trial, Kolezev acted as one of the main witnesses there, and factually ruled Znak.com when she couldn't. The trial was intensely covered by Russian and worldwide press. In 2019, a survey by Medialogia agency found that Ura.ru was the 1st most cited news source in Sverdlovsk Oblast, and Znak.com was the 2nd one among the total of 25.

Worldwide mass media regularly cite Dmirty Kolezev as a source of local opinions on events happening in the Urals and Russia. These include: The Washington Post, The New York Times, CBC, The Times, The Guardian and others.

In 2020, Kolezev declared that he was separating from Znak.com to rule solely the It's My City project as an independent mass media while previously it was a "society column" section within Znak.com. Kolezev is considered a local "celebrity" and maintains popular personal information channels such as Telegram, YouTube and Twitter channels, Facebook, LiveJournal and other pages, watched by thousands of subscribers. He also served as a jury member of the Russian journalistic award Redkollegia.

In June 2021, he was appointed Chief Editor of the news website Republic based in Moscow. In March 2022, he fled Russia on the grounds of expressing opposition to the 2022 Russian invasion of Ukraine. Later he was declared wanted by Russian police and arrested in absentia.

== Links ==
- Dmitry Kolezev's columns in English at OpenDemocracy
- Kolezev.ru, personal website
