= Anton Nossik =

Russian journalist, social activist and blogger

- Антон Носик
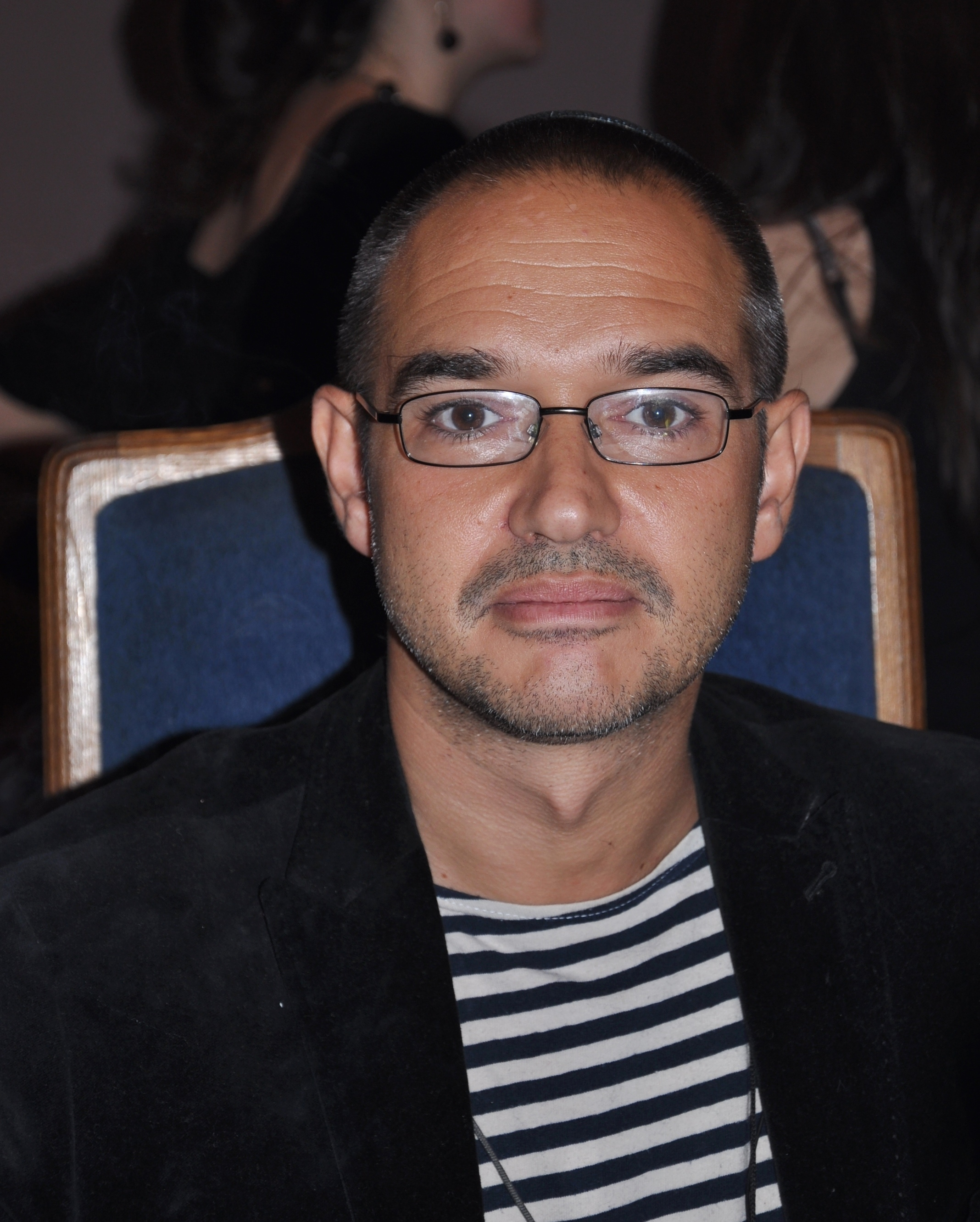
- Nossik in 2009
- Born: Anton Borisovich Nosik; 4 July 1966; Moscow, Moscow Oblast, Russian SFSR, Soviet Union
- Died: 9 July 2017 (aged 51); Pirogovo, Moscow Oblast, Russia
- Other name: Anton Nosik
- Occupations: Manager; public figure; writer; blogger; columnist; editor; journalist; Anton Nosik's voice From the Echo of Moscow Program, 30 June 2013

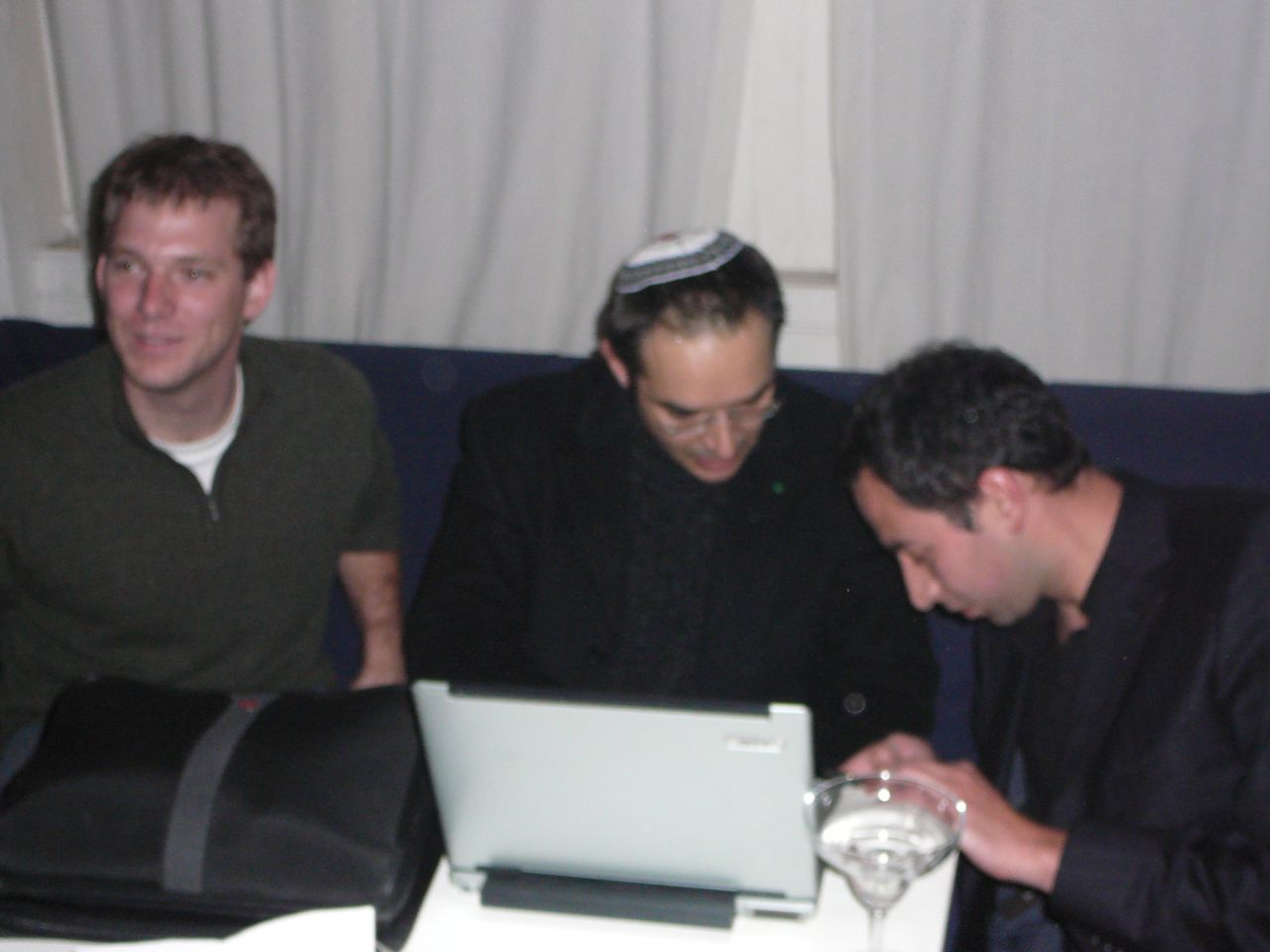
Brad Fitzpatrick, Nossik, and Edward Shenderovich

Anton Borisovich Nossik (Russian: Антон Борисович Носик; 4 July 1966 – 9 July 2017) was a Russian journalist, social activist and blogger. Ranked 10th place on the RuNet according to the Yandex.Blogs ranking, he was sometimes called one of the godfathers of the Russian Internet or the first Russian-language blogger. He was an editor for the Russian online news publications Vesti.ru, Lenta.ru, Gazeta.ru, and NEWSru.com.

Nossik was one of the former managers of Rambler and blogging service holding company SUP Media (participated in this capacity in the LiveJournal service acquisition), and was the founder of Pomogi.org charitable foundation. Since mid-October 2009, he was appointed Deputy General Director of United Media and, concurrently, the position of chief editor Bfm.ru. From 16 November 2011 to 29 November 2012, he was the media director of SUP Media, which owns the LiveJournal service. In mid-2014, he co-founded Fuzzy cheese, a market and public-opinion research company.

== Biography ==
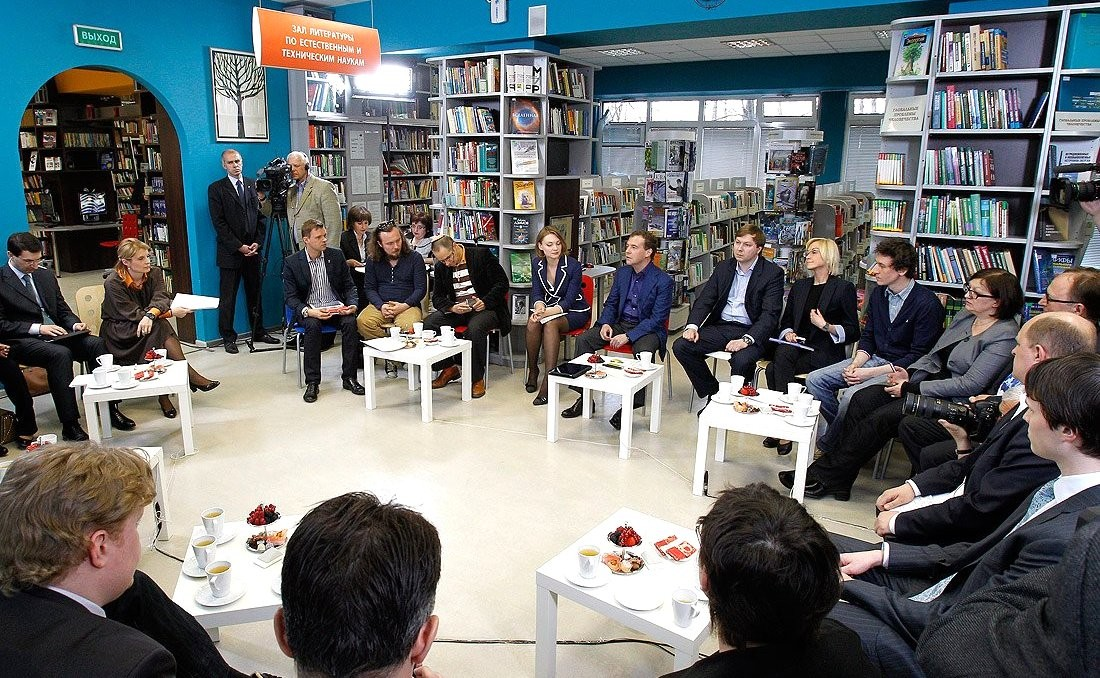
In 2011 Russian President Dmitry Medvedev met with representatives of the Russian internet community, including Anton Nossik.

Nossik was born to a Jewish family of writer Boris Nossik and philologist of Polish Victoria Mochalova. His father was elected as an honorary member of the Russian Academy of Arts in 2011. He had one sister, Sandra, who teaches sociolinguistics at the French University of Franche-Comté. The artist Ilya Kabakov was his stepfather.

He graduated from the Moscow State University of Medicine and Dentistry, but was better known for his role in pioneering the beginning of Russian online news. Nossik moved to Israel in the early 90s and worked for some time at the Jerusalem Post, before returning to Russia in 1997.

=== Activism ===
Nossik was a member of the public council of the Russian Jewish Congress. He was also a co-chair of the first roundtable on the introduction of Creative Commons licenses in the Russian Federation in 2008. His photos are available under CC-BY-2.0 and CC-BY-3.0 licenses.

In March 2013, Nossik took part in a series of pickets for the liberation of two members of Pussy Riot: Maria Alyokhina and Nadezhda Tolokonnikova. He was later involved in the Ukraine — Russia: Dialogue conference, which took place in Kyiv during 24–25 April 2014.

Nosik was a strident critic of the Russian government's moves to crack down on Internet freedoms in recent years with harsh legislative regulation. Speaking to AFP in 2014, he warned that "Russia's shift to the North Korean model of managing the internet will have far-reaching consequences for the country's economy and public sentiment."

In 2014, Nossik posted an article in response to Vladimir Putin's crackdown on internet freedom called "Russia's First Blogger Reacts to Putin's Internet Crackdown": "In December 1999, three days before he became acting president of Russia, Vladimir Putin made a solemn pledge to honor and protect Internet freedom of speech and commerce, recognizing the importance of this new industry for Russia's modernization and general development. As a result, the Internet developed into Russia's only competitive industry. When Putin had made his initial pledge not to interfere, he lived up to his promise for almost 13 years. Unfortunately, those 13 happy years are over now and we're witnessing a fast and ruthless destruction of online freedom." In the article, Nossik criticized Putin's flip-flopping stance and move to silence internet journalists. "This Orwellian masterpiece of legislation was signed into law by Vladimir Putin on May 5, 2014, and it will be enforced from August 1, 2014. Will that be the last day of Russian Internet? Maybe. Unless a new law kills it even faster," he wrote.

=== Russian criminal investigation ===
At the end of 2015, Nossik was under a criminal investigation under part 1 of article 282 the Russian Criminal Code (incitement of hatred or enmity) for a blog post about Syria. According to the prosecution, on 1 October 2015 Nossik published a post titled "Erase Syria from the face of the Earth", in which, according to a linguistic expert solicited for the prosecution, "signs of inciting hatred against the Syrians, based on the national-territorial principle" were detected. The post urged President Vladimir Putin to act as he perceived Syria as a military threat to Israel. Opposition figures in Russia pointed to the irony of Nossik being brought to trial as, at the time, Russia was being accused by the West of committing war crimes in Syria during their bombing raids against forces opposing President Bashar al-Assad.

On 19 September 2016, the prosecution asked to sentence Nossik to two years imprisonment. On 3 October 2016, the Presnya court of Moscow convicted Nossik and sentenced him to a fine of 500 thousand rubles. On 15 December 2016, Moscow city court reduced the fine to 300 thousand rubles. In January 2017, an appeal to the conviction was accepted for hearing by the ECHR.

=== Death ===
Nossik died from a heart attack in the night of 9 July 2017 at the age of 51 in Pirogovo, Mytishchinsky District, Moscow Oblast, in the summer house of his friends.

Since his death, Russian bloggers, journalists, and media personalities have shared their memories of Nossik, whom they remember as a dogged worker who built the RuNet from the ground up, helping turn it into, in his own words, Russia's only territory of unlimited free speech. Pavel Durov, the founder of VKontakte and Telegram, wrote in a post on VKontakte that Nossik had, until his last days, stood in defense of the Internet and common sense in his precise and vivid posts on LiveJournal, where Nossik blogged. Galina Timchenko, the executive editor of the news website Meduza and a former colleague of Nossik's, wrote: "For all of us at Meduza, Nossik was probably the single most important person on the Russian Internet; we consider him to be the founding father of Russian Internet journalism."

== See also ==
- Vesti (Israeli newspaper)
