= Aksana Panova =

Russian journalist

Aksana Panova is a Russian journalist, most known for leading the news sites Ura.ru and Znak.com. She also served as campaign manager for Yevgeny Roizman's successful opposition campaign for Mayor of Yekaterinburg in 2013.

== Biography ==
=== Ura.ru ===
Panova launched Ura.ru as an independent news website in 2006.

=== 2012-14 trial ===
In 2006 and 2007, she led an investigation into businessman Konstantin Kremko for Ura.ru. In 2012, Kremko accused her of having extorted a bribe out of him.

In July 2013, she pleaded guilty to tax evasion, stating that she had withdrawn $400 000 from Ura.ru's bank accounts and transferred them to accounts set up for non-existent companies with the goal of paying staff salaries without having to pay welfare taxes. In December 2013, the court dismissed one of the charges against her.

In 2014, the court found her guilty of extortion, handing down a two-year suspended sentence, including a 400 000 rubles fine and being banned from conducting journalism for two years.

The trial was met with widespread controversy among journalists and human rights groups, with several saying that it represented a crackdown on investigative journalism in Russia. OSCE Representative on Freedom of the Media Dunja Mijatović stated that the trial "marks a worrying trend for free media in Russia and can stifle critical speech in the country."

=== Znak.com ===
Panova founded Znak.com in December 2012.

Following the 2022 Russian invasion of Ukraine, Znak.com announced that it would be suspending its operations "due to a large number of restrictions that have recently been imposed on the work of media outlets in Russia."

== See also ==
- Media freedom in Russia
