= Edward Shenderovich =

American entrepreneur of Russian origin (born 1976)

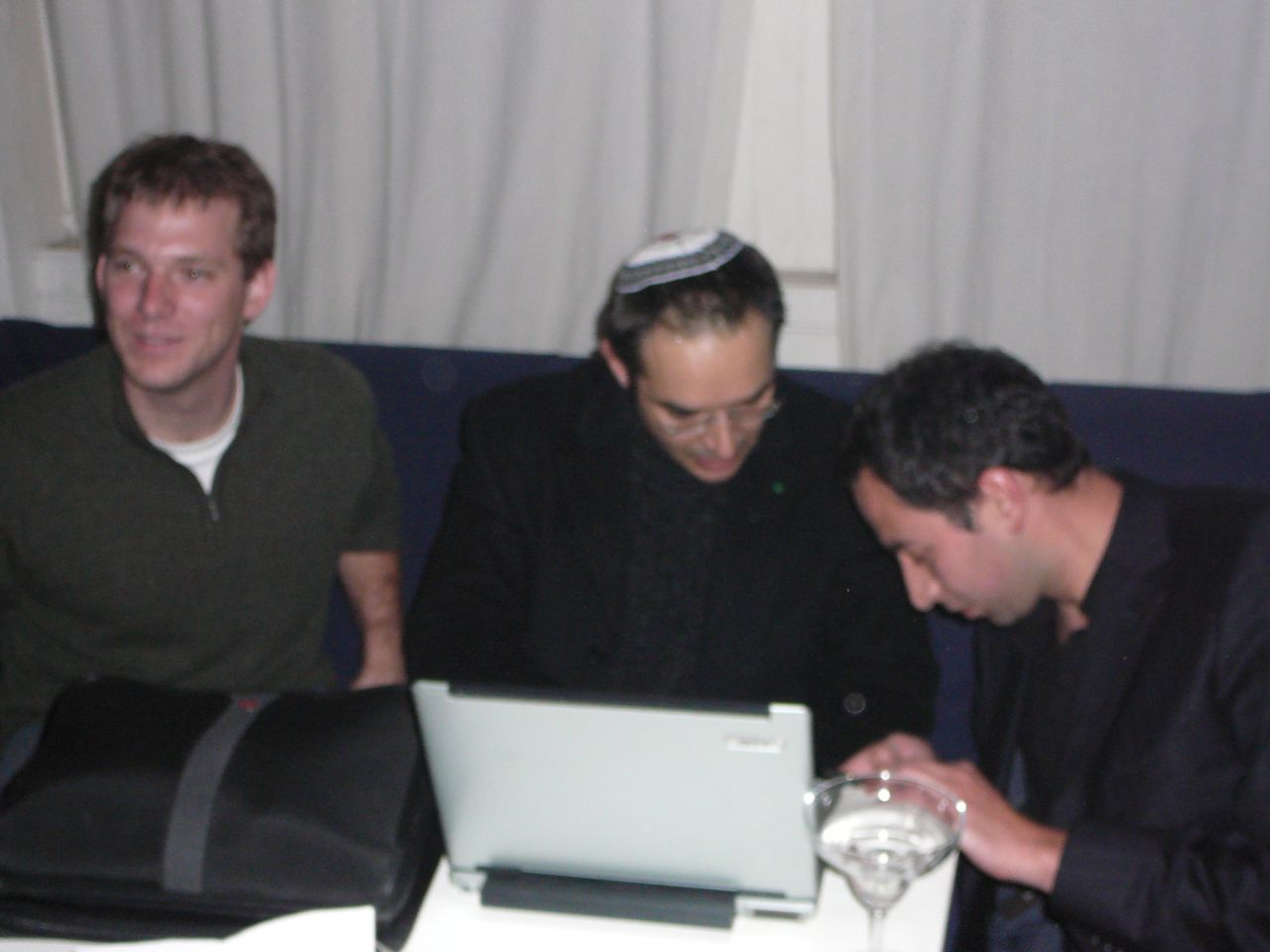
Shenderovich (right) with Anton Nossik (center) and Brad Fitzpatrick

Edward Shenderovich (born January 7, 1976) is an American entrepreneur, publisher, educator and award-winning poet.

== Business ==
Shenderovich was born in Leningrad, USSR (now St. Petersburg, Russia). He came to the United States aged 14 in 1990, later becoming a naturalized American citizen. He attended Mira Mesa High School in San Diego and graduated from the University of California at Berkeley.

In 2006, Shenderovich became a founding executive of online media company SUP and oversaw the company's strategic development, including the development of LiveJournal in Russia.

In 2009, Shenderovich founded Kite Ventures, a venture investment company that led investments in Darberry (acquired by Groupon), Fyber (FRA:FBEN), Delivery Hero (FRA:DHER), Plated (acquired by Albertsons), Tradeshift, and others.

In 2015 he co-founded and became executive chairman of Knotel, a flexible real estate service, now owned by Newmark Group.

Shenderovich is currently the co-founder and CEO of Roebling (formerly Synonym), a New York-based company building AI-assisted process engineering and techno-economic modeling infrastructure for the bioeconomy and broader process industries. Roebling is backed by Andreessen Horowitz.

== Poetry ==
Shenderovich writes and publishes poetry in Russian. He has been published by many Russian journals and included in ‘’Ulysses Released: Contemporary Russian Poets Abroad (In Russian:2004)’’ edited by Dmitry Kuzmin. In December 2010, Samokat Publishing House released a collection of Shenderovich's children's poems. A new collection came out in January 2014. Translators of his poetry into English include Richard Wayne Chambliss.

In September 2015, Shenderovich's collection entitled "About One, Two, 3, 4 and 5" received an award at Biennial of Illustration Bratislava.

== MiNE ==
In 2000, Shenderovich became a professor of business modeling at Universitá Cattolica del Sacro Cuore in Piacenza, Italy, and was named Fellow of the MiNE cratos program in 2004.
