= NEWSru =

Former Russian news website

NEWSru.com
- Website type: News site
- Available in: Russian, Ukrainian
- Owner: Vladimir Gusinsky
- Website: newsru.com newsru.co.il newsru.ua
- Commercial: Yes
- Registration: Free/Subscription
- Launched: August 28, 2000
- Current status: Russian branch is inactive from May 31, 2021 (news archive publicly available), Ukrainian branch inactive since 2017, Israeli branch active

NEWSru.com was a Russian independent online news site based in Moscow that was generally critical of the Russian government. Launched by Russian internet pioneer Anton Nossik in 2000, it closed in 2021 after experiencing difficulties attracting advertisers due to the site's editorial positions. The Israeli sister service Newsru.co.il remains operational

== History ==
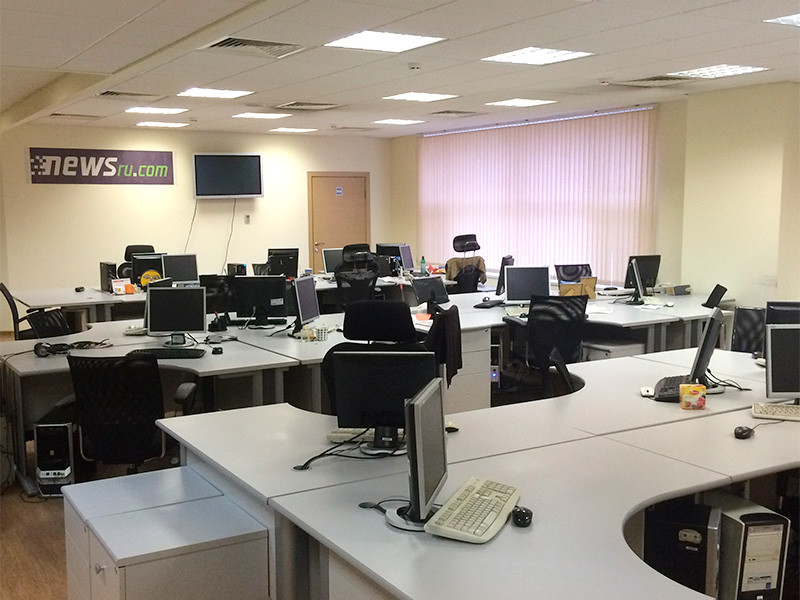
Empty office of NEWSru.com

NEWSru launched by Russian internet pioneer Anton Nossik on August 28, 2000, with the domain name ntu.ru Yelena Bereznitskaya-Bruni replaced the initial Editor in Chief Igor Barchugov in 2001.

In 2002, the state-run OAO Gazprom Media took over NTV, and NEWSru remained part of the media empire of former NTV owner and oligarch Vladimir Gusinsky. The takeover was seen as a turning point in media freedom in post-Soviet Russia.

In 2009, Russian journalist Maria Yulikova described NEWSru as one of the leading independent news sources in Russia.

The site primarily operated as a news aggregator.

In May 2021, the site announced it would close for "economic reasons" due to a difficulty with attracting advertisers because the site did not follow the editorial line of pro-Kremlin state media. Editor-in-Chief Yelena Bereznitskaya said "In the current situation, we realized that we won’t find funding in the near future for what we love and know how to do — objective news." The site's staff planned to continue to focus on newsru.co.il, its Russian-language Israeli offshoot.

== Headquarters and team ==
NEWSru was based in Moscow, but its editorial team and location were kept secret. The network had two foreign editions: a website in Israel started in December 2005 (newsru.co.il), and a Ukrainian edition based in Kyiv, which was discontinued in March 2017.

Chief editor Olga Leni admitted that the Ukrainian publication had been subsidized for the entire 10 years of its existence, and the site had never been self-supporting. Other former employees agreed that the site was closed due to a pro-Ukrainian pronouncement on the conflict in Donbas.
