= Gazeta.Ru =

Russian state-controlled website

- Type: Online newspaper
- Owner: Rambler Media Group (subsidiary of Sberbank)
- Founder: Anton Nosik
- Editor-in-chief: Sergey Rybka
- Founded: February 28, 1999; 27 years ago
- Language: Russian
- Website: gazeta.ru

Gazeta.Ru (Russian: Газета.Ru) is a Russian news site based in Moscow. In 2012, ownership of Gazeta.Ru was transferred to Alexander Mamut. In 2020, the state-owned company Sberbank became the sole owner of Gazeta.Ru's holding company, Rambler Media Group.

== History ==
Gazeta.Ru was launched in 1999 as a project with the Foundation for Effective Politics (rus. Фонд эффекти́вной поли́тики) under the leadership of Anton Nosik. In February 1999 the first publication was published. In September 1999 the publications Vesti.ru and Lenta.ru were created, and the brand Gazeta.ru was sold to the company Yukos, which created a new edition under the leadership of former editor-in-chief of the daily business newspaper Kommersant, Vladislav Borodulin. After its time under Vladislav Borodulin who owned 100% of the stock, Gazeta.Ru was sold to Sekret Firmy in 2005, a publishing house owned by Alisher Usmanov since 2006. In 2005 Aleksandr Pisarev served as chief editor for one year.

He was replaced by Mikhail Mikhailin who held its position till 2010. Then Mikhail Kotov became chief editor, but he left Gazeta.ru in 2013 because he did not agree with the power shift in the newspaper.

In 2012 Alisher Usmanov sold his interest in SUP Media to Alexander Mamut. In 2013 companies SUP Media and Rambler-Afisha were united in the Combined company Afisha.Rambler.SUP (from 2014 Rambler&Co).

In 2013 Svetlana Lolaeva, a member of staff since 2007, served as chief editor and, in the same year, was replaced by Svetlana Babaeva, a former employee of Izvestia and RIA Novosti. In 2016 Olga Alekseeva was announced as chief editor.

In October 2019, Sergey Rybka became the chief editor. Gazeta.Ru is the 50th most-visited website in Russia, according to Alexa Internet rankings.

== Content ==
Gazeta.Ru is sociopolitically oriented and features continually updated daily news. Gazeta.Ru is also known for its editorials, op-eds, columns and online interviews with politicians and economists. In 2001 Gazeta.ru published an online-interview with president Vladimir Putin.

According to Medialogy, Gazeta.Ru was one of the three most cited news sources in the country in November 2014.

The video projects "Tea Party" and "7 minutes with Maxim Shevchenko" were launched in May 2016. The hosts of the first program were Georgy Bovt, the newspaper's columnist, and Ekaterina Vinokurova, a special correspondent for the Ural Internet publication Znak.com.

== Columnists (different periods) ==
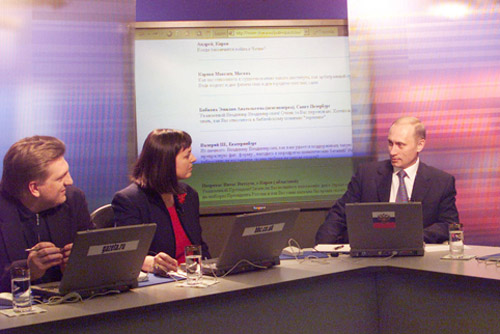
Vladimir Putin in March 2001 during online news conference with BBC correspondent Bridget Kendall and Editor-in-Chief of Gazeta.Ru Vladislav Borodulin

- Yulia Latynina, writer and journalist
- Igor Irtenyev, poet
- Valery Panyushkin, journalist and writer
- Aleksandr Kabakov, writer
- Sergey Aleksashenko, economist

== Chief editors ==
- Anton Nossik (1999)
- Vladislav Borodulin (1999 – 2005)
- Aleksandr Pisarev (2005 – 2006)
- Mikhail Mikhailin (January 2006 – July 2010)
- Mikhail Kotov (2010 – March 2013)
- Svetlana Lolaeva (March – September 2013)
- Svetlana Babaeva (2013 – July 2016)
- Olga Alekseeva (July 2016 – October 2019)
- Sergey Rybka (October 2019 – present day)

== Criticism ==
In November 2013, social networks drew attention to the material "Navalny found terra incognita" about the publication by politician Alexei Navalny of information about the dacha cooperative "Sosny" (Pine trees), where a number of members of the United Russia party live. In it, the author of Gazeta.Ru complained about the inability to get through to opposition political scientists, which is why the article presented only the point of view of pro-government figures.

In February 2015, the Los Angeles Times journalist Sergey Loiko, who covered the War in Donbas, published a correspondence with the deputy editor-in-chief of Gazeta.Ru, Pyotr Vlasov. In it, the Russian media manager expressed physical threats, along the way accusing his colleague of working for the "bosses in the states".

On March 31, 2015, the Anonymous International group posted for free download SMS correspondence for 2011–2014 of Timur Prokopenko, Deputy Head of the Office of the President of the Russian Federation for Internal Policy. In one of the messages, the official addressed the top manager of Rambler, Alexei Goreslavsky, and through him, the editor-in-chief of Gazeta.Ru Svetlana Babaeva with demands to urgently respond to criticism of the Olympic Games in Russia from Viktor Shenderovich. The next day Gazeta.Ru released an editorial beginning with the words "It's amazing how much the Internet prevents ordinary Russians from recklessly enjoying the Olympic Games”. The article discussed how unfairly bloggers criticize the Olympic Games in Sochi.

In April 2016, Bloomberg News columnist Leonid Bershidsky called Gazeta.Ru a "pro-Putin media" acting in the interests of the Russian authorities.

On November 23, 2020, Gazeta.Ru published an article containing a fake quote from Antony Blinken about Putin and the Russian people. Subsequently, based on the article, inaccurate information was reprinted by a number of other Russian media.

On November 24, 2020, an article appeared in Gazeta.Ru stating that the West decided to replace Alexey Navalny with his wife Yulia. Gazeta.Ru named "german Abendlich Hamburg" as the source of this information. Next day, a German-based newspaper OstWest published an article revealing the spread of false information by a number of Russian media outlets, including Gazeta. According to OstWest and Die Welt, "german Abendlich Hamburg" is a Russian website that is disguised as German and copies articles from the Russian state broadcaster RT. Sara Pagung, expert at the German Council on Foreign Relations, commenting on the appearance of an article in Gazeta.Ru, notes that "It is not uncommon to create fake news pages that you can then refer to. Later, larger media pick it up".

== Awards and recognitions ==
In 2009 Gazeta.Ru was recognized as the best business media at the All-Russian Business Journalism Content of the RUIE.

In 2010 Gazeta.Ru was awarded in the category “Section of the Year” at the RUIE All-Russian Business Journalism Content.
