= Russian 2020 COVID-19 Fake News Law =

Russian fake news law regarding the COVID-19 pandemic

2020 COVID-19 Fake News Law

Federal Assembly
- Long title: On Amendments to the Code of Administrative Offenses of the Russian Federation On Amendments to the Criminal Code the Russian Federation
- Signed by: President Vladimir Putin
- Signed: 1 April 2020

Legislative history
- First reading: 31 March 2020 (State Duma)
- Second reading: 31 March 2020 (Federation Council)

Amends
- Code of the Russian Federation on Administrative Offenses; Criminal Code of Russia
- Status: Current legislation

The Russian 2020 COVID-19 Fake News Law is a group of 2 federal laws, adopted by State Duma on 31 March 2020, approved by Federation Council on 31 March 2020, and signed by President of Russia Vladimir Putin on 1 April 2020, establishing the administrative (Law No.99-FZ) and criminal (Law No.100-FZ) punishment for a dissemination of "unreliable" information about circumstances that threat to life and health of a citizen including epidemic, natural and technological disasters, emergency, and measures to ensure the security. These laws were aimed at making illegal any doubts as to the nature of COVID-19 and the reasonableness of the measures to combat the epidemic. These laws are an extension of Russian fake news laws.

== Overview ==
The Federal Law of 1 April 2020 No.99-FZ supplemented the article 13.15 of the Code of the Russian Federation on Administrative Offenses with parts 10.1 and 10.2 providing huge administrative fines for natural persons and juridical persons for the dissemination of "unreliable information" about circumstances that threat to life and health of a citizen including epidemic, natural and technological disasters, emergency, and measures to ensure the security.

The Federal Law of 1 April 2020 No.100-FZ supplemented the Criminal Code of the Russian Federation with articles 207.1 and 207.2 providing huge criminal fines, forced labour and imprisonment of up to 5 years for natural persons for the dissemination of "unreliable information" about circumstances that threat to life and health of a citizen including epidemic, natural and technological disasters, emergency, and measures to ensure the security, if such dissemination has produced or could produce human casualties, damage to health of people or to environment, significant material losses, violation of living conditions of the population.

== Application of law ==
The first criminal case was opened against political activist Anna Shushpanova who stated in social media that patient with COVID-19 was sent home.

The first person who was convicted under new articles of the Criminal Code of Russia is Ekaterina Khrapchenkova who stated in social media that one of Moscow's store sells masks previously received from Chinese authorities as humanitarian aid.

== Reaction ==
On 29 April 2020, Amnesty International stated that Russian authorities had prosecuted social media users, journalists and medical professionals for exposing flaws in their COVID-19 responses.

According to the Freedom House report, Russian authorities imposed additional restrictions for media under the pretext of pandemic.

== See also ==
- Russian fake news laws
- Impact of the COVID-19 pandemic on journalism
