= Vladimir Khanumyan =

Russian media executive (born 1957)

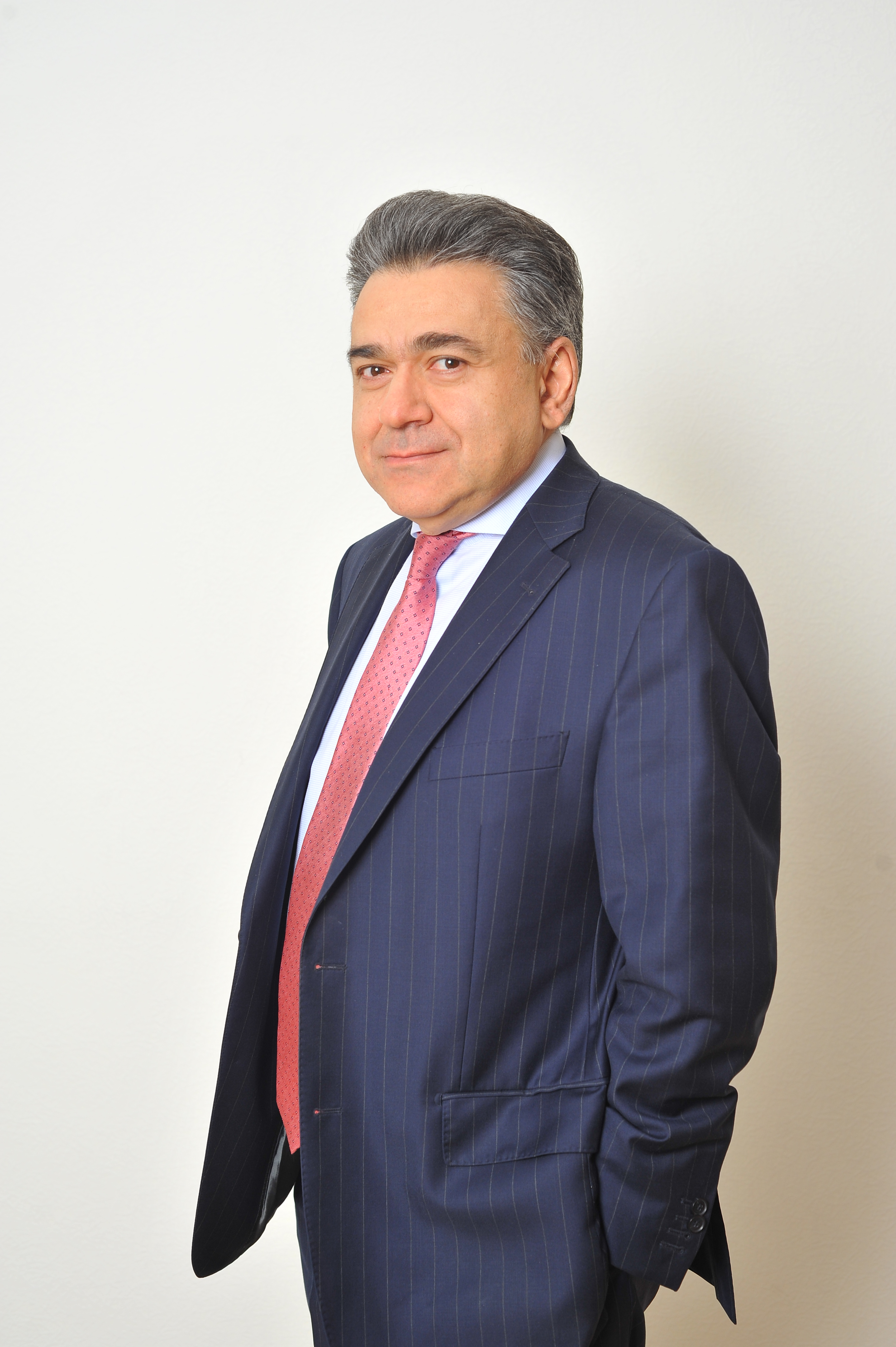
- Born: November 16, 1957 (age 68); Tbilisi, Georgian SSR, USSR

Vladimir Khanumyan (Russian: Владимир Сергеевич Ханумян; born November 16, 1957, in Tbilisi, Georgian SSR, USSR) is a Russian media executive. He managed the media assets of several leading Russian companies: CTC Media, NMG-TV, AFK Sistema, and Gazprom Media. He is a member of the Russian Television Academy.

== Biography ==
Vladimir Khanumyan was born in Tbilisi on November 16, 1957. After graduating from Tbilisi State University in 1979, he started his professional career as a journalist in local newspapers “Molodezh Gruzii” (“Georgian Youth”) and later “Vecherni Tbilisi” (“Tbilisi Evening”). In 1985 he was promoted to a managing position, and later served as a deputy chief editor.

In the 1990s Vladimir Khanumyan pursued his career in Russian media industry serving as top executive for the leading television companies.

The biggest part of his career (starting 1996) was dedicated to one of the largest entertainment TV Holdings in Russia – CTC Media, an American TV company established by an American entrepreneur Peter Gerwe. Vladimir Khanumyan worked as a commercial director, later in 1997-1998 he was CEO of CTC Moscow TV channel, then led CTC Regions – a holding company that monitored and controlled CTC Media's regional assets.

Starting from 2004, he served as Chief Operating Officer for CTC Media which by that time owned and operated three entertainment channels in Russia (CTC, Domashny, and DTV) and one TV channel in Kazakhstan. At the same time he held positions of the First deputy CEO of CTC and Domashny channels.

As Chief Operating Officer, Vladimir Khanumyan was responsible for the company's operations as well as for preparing CTC Media IPO on NASDAQ, the first ever Russian media company IPO in New-York.

After leaving CTC Media in 2008, Khanumyan worked as a General director for NMG-TV – a company that operated two TV channels — Channel 5 and REN TV. One of them (REN-TV) at that time was a joint venture with RTL Group.

In 2012-2013 Vladimir Khanumyan hold a position of First Vice President and then President of Sistema Mass Media – a media division of one of the biggest diversified Russian business groups — AFK Sistema. In February 2014, he was appointed to the position of the Vice-Chairman of Gazprom-media Holding – the leading Russian media company. He was responsible for the entertainment television division overseeing four free-to-air channels (TNT, TV-3, Pyatnitsa!, 2×2) and some other content divisions.

After resignation Khanumyan established a joint venture with Sony Entertainment Television that operates three Sony channels in Russia and CIS countries.

== Awards ==
- Vladimir Khanumyan holds Russian media industry award “Media Manager of Russia” which he got in 2007 while being Chief Operating Officer of CTC Media.
- In 2014 he was rated the fifth top Russian executive in media industry by Russian Managers’ Association and Kommersant Publishing house.
