= Wacław Radziwinowicz =

Polish journalist

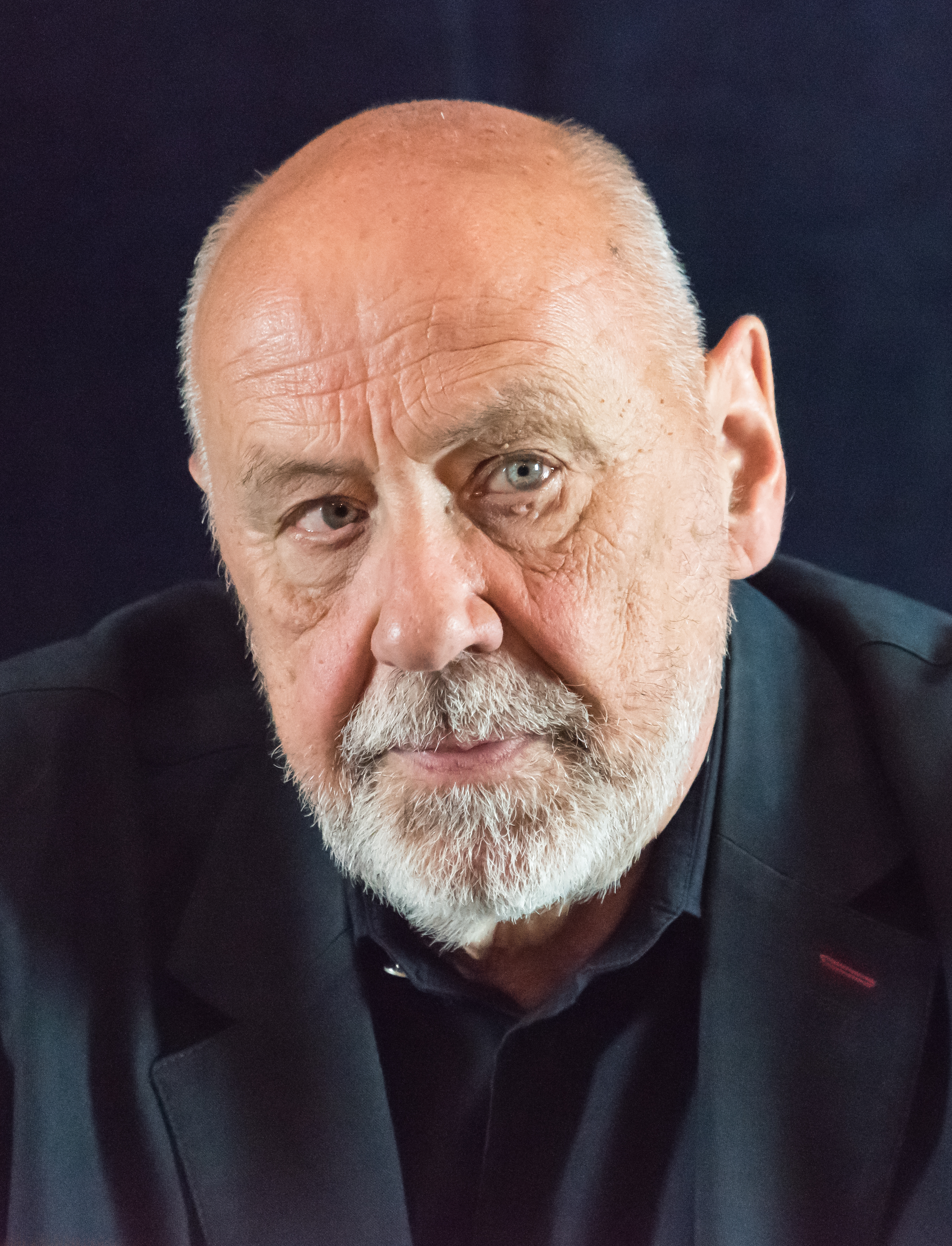
Wacław Radziwinowicz (2023)

Wacław Radziwinowicz (born 1953, Olsztyn) is a Polish journalist who worked as a correspondent of Gazeta Wyborcza in Russia from 1997 until he was expelled in December 2015. He has published two books about Russia.
