= Igor Irtenyev =

Russian poet (born 1947)

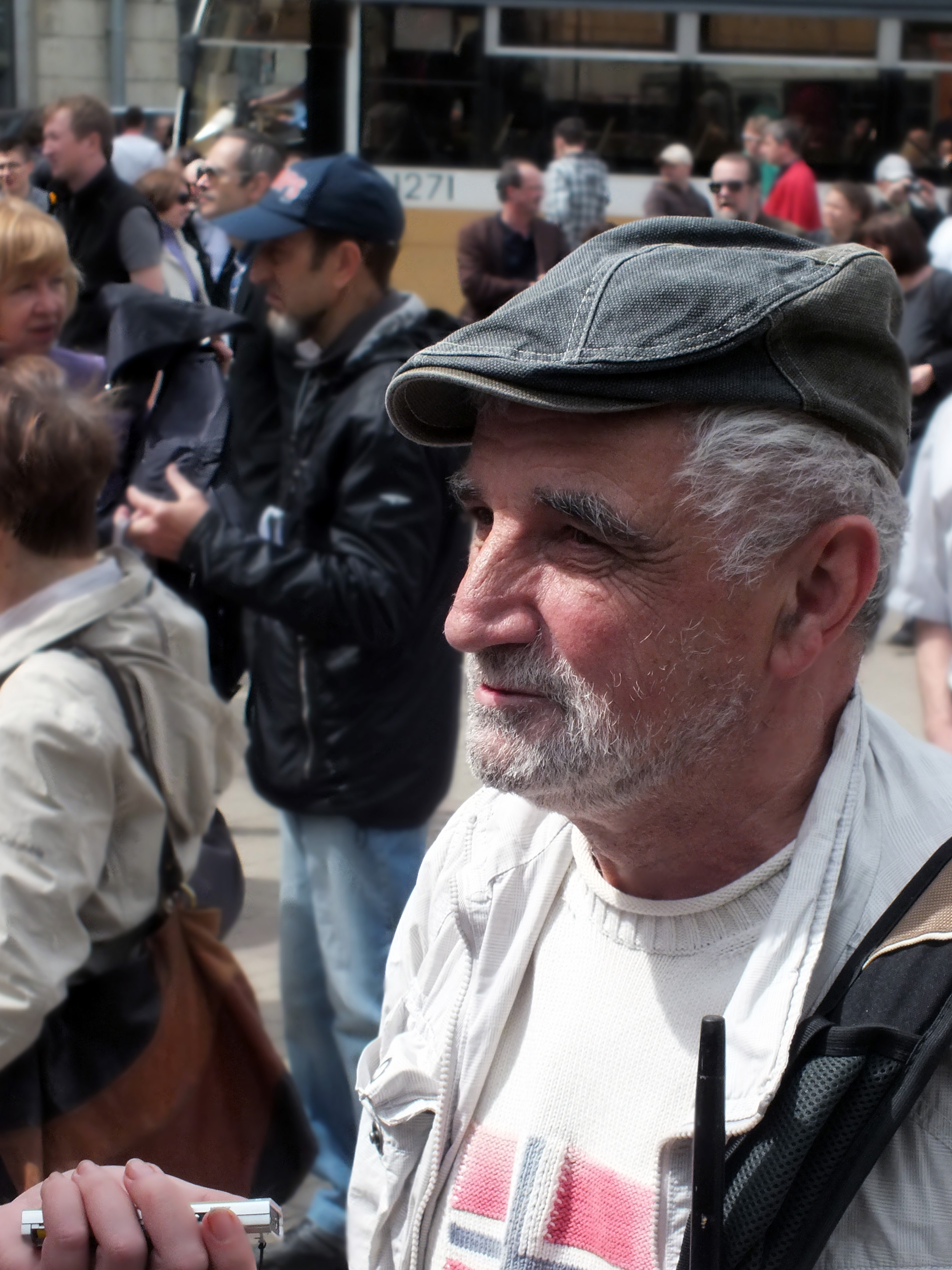

Igor Moiseyevich Irtenyev (Russian: Игорь Моисеевич Иртеньев; born 25 May 1947, Moscow) is an Israeli poet.

== Biography ==
He is a member of PEN Russia. In 2011, he emigrated to Israel because, as he said "I just can't bear the idea of watching [Vladimir] Putin on television every day for the next 12 years". However, he returned to Russia after spending two years in Israel.
