= Georgi Kolpakov =

Russian-Kazakhstani footballer

Georgi Kolpako
Personal information
- Full name: Georgi Georgiyevich Kolpakov
- Date of birth: 18 April 1979 (age 47)
- Height: 1.84 m (6 ft 0 in)
- Position: Defender

Senior career*
Years	Team	Apps	(Gls)
1996–1997	FC Kavkazkabel Prokhladny	10	(0)
1998–2000	FC Mozdok	85	(7)
2002	FC Druzhba Maykop	32	(0)
2003–2004	FC Okzhetpes	48	(0)
2005	FC Aktobe-Lento	3	(0)
2006–2008	FC Vostok	58	(2)
2009	FC Kavkaztransgaz-2005 Ryzdvyany	17	(1)
- * Club domestic league appearances and goals

Georgi Georgiyevich Kolpakov (Russian: Георгий Георгиевич Колпаков; born 18 April 1979) is a former Russian professional footballer. He also holds Kazakhstani citizenship.
