= Sagra, Russia =

Rural locality in Russia

Coordinates: 57°1′52″N 60°18′9″E

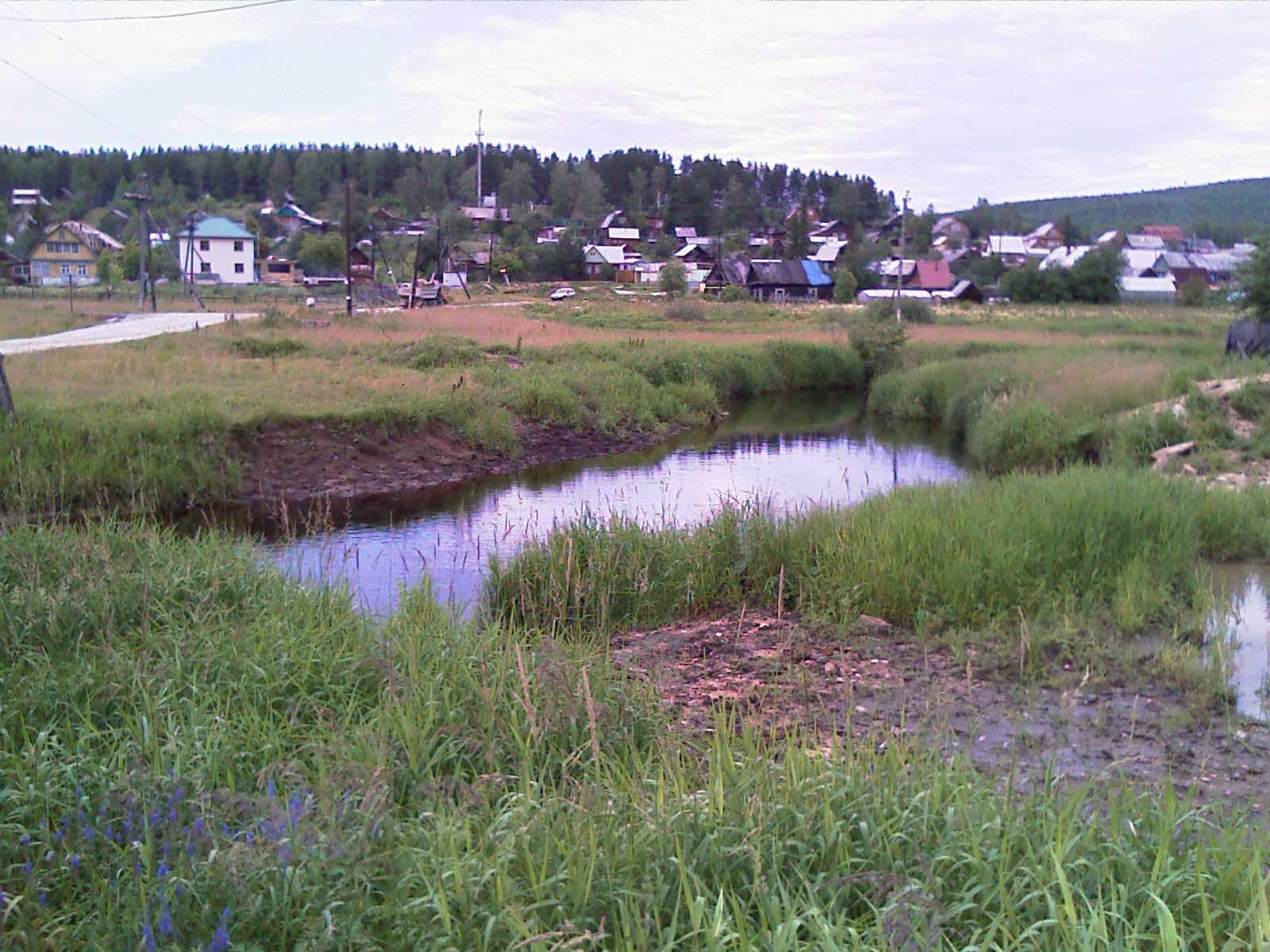
Sagra in July 2011

Sagra (Russian: Сагра) is a rural locality (a settlement) under the administrative jurisdiction of the town of Verkhnyaya Pyshma in Sverdlovsk Oblast, Russia, located 30 kilometers (19 mi) northwest of Yekaterinburg.

== Overview ==
The settlement stands on the Black River, which flows into the nearby Isetskoe Lake. Sagra's population is between 113 and 188 people. The settlement has a railway platform on the Nizhny Tagil line to Yekaterinburg.

Sagra's name comes from northern Russian dialect word Sogra, meaning "swamp overgrown with low forests". To the southeast of the village is extensive marshland, which has been partly drained and overgrown with pines.

== Events of July 1, 2011 ==
On the night of Friday, July 1, 2011, there was a skirmish on the outskirts of the village between around thirty people. The skirmish was between residents, a group of bandits, and gang members, who came to Sagra by car and were members of the Azerbaijani diaspora in Yekaterinburg. One of the attackers was killed during the incident, a twenty-eight-year-old Georgian-born Azerbaijani man named Faig Musaev.

Police were called, but arrived hours later. The residents were charged with hooliganism.

T-shirts honoring the town’s defense were later printed: “If the government can’t help people,” they read, “It doesn’t have the right to forbid them from defending themselves — Sagra 2011.”

Local residents asked Yevgeny Roizman for help, who attracted massive public attention through high-profile posts in his LiveJournal.
