= Lenta.ru =

Moscow-based online newspaper in Russian language

- Website type: Online newspaper
- Available in: Russian
- Owner: Rambler Media Group (subsidiary of Sberbank)
- Creator: Anton Nossik
- Website: lenta.ru
- Commercial: Yes
- Registration: Free/Subscription
- Launched: September 18, 1999; 27 years ago
- Current status: Active

Lenta.ru (Russian: Лента.Ру; stylised as LƐNTA.RU) is a Russian-language online newspaper. Based in Moscow, it is owned by Rambler Media Group. In 2013, the Alexander Mamut-owned companies "SUP Media" and "Rambler-Afisha" merged to form "Afisha.Rambler.SUP", which owns Lenta.ru. In 2012, the online newspaper was one of the most popular Russian language online resources with over 600 thousand visitors daily.

In March 2014, Lenta.ru underwent a change of leadership following politically motivated interference by its owner. Editor-in-chief Galina Timchenko and 39 staff members left the outlet and later founded a newspaper Meduza, in November of the same year.

== History ==
In 1999 Anton Nosik launched Lenta.ru together with Gleb Pavlovsky of the Foundation for Effective Politics. It was (like vesti.ru) a sister e-news project under the brand Gazeta.Ru. Nosik served as its chief editor till 2004.

A Berkman Center 2010 study found it to be the most cited news source in the Russian blogosphere.

In 2013, Alexander Mamut through his ownership of the Afisha-Rambler-SUP Group acquired Lenta.ru.

In 2013, Lenta.ru was ranked by comScore-study the 5th in terms of traffic among European news websites (in all languages).

In January 2013, the website was relaunched with a new design and significant changes to the rubricating system. This was the most serious update of the site since 2004.

In 2020, Mamut sold Rambler to Sberbank.

=== Replacement of the leadership and staff in 2014 ===
Following a March 10, 2014, Lenta.ru interview by Ilya Azar (Note: Russian: Илья Вильямович Азар Ukrainian: Ілля Вільямович Азар) of Andriy Tarasenko (Note: Russian: Андрей Иванович Тарасенко Ukrainian: Андрій Іванович Тарасенко) from the Right Sector's Kyiv branch, Russian censorship organization Roskomnadzor accused Lenta.ru of violating Russian media censorship and "counter-extremism" laws. (Note: On March 5, 2014, Dmytro Yarosh received Basmanny Justice (Russian: Басманное Правосудие) and was charged in absentia by Moscow's Basmanny court for his actions.) Since the warning by Roskomnadzor was the second issued in a 12-month period, Roskomnadzor could ask the courts to terminate Lenta.ru's mass media license. Both the BBC and The Economist called Russian state response to the publications by Lenta.ru a censorship.

On March 12, 2014 the owner, Alexander Mamut, fired the Editor-in-Chief Galina Timchenko and replaced her with Alexey Goreslavsky. Thirty-nine employees out of the total 84, including Director-general Yuliya Minder, lost their jobs. This includes 32 writing journalists, all photo-editors (5 people) and 6 administrators. The employees of Lenta.ru issued a statement that the purpose of the move was to install a new Editor-in-Chief directly controlled by the Kremlin and turn the website into a propaganda tool. Dunja Mijatović, the OSCE Representative on Freedom of the Media, referred to the move as a manifestation of censorship.

Galina Timchenko, together with a team of around 20 journalists who resigned from their jobs at Lenta.ru, started the new internet newspaper Meduza.

=== Coverage of 2022 Russian invasion of Ukraine ===
On 9 May 2022, the Russian Victory Day, during the Russian invasion of Ukraine, Lenta.ru briefly displayed information about the Russian war against Ukraine in a way that did not comply with government regulations or the enforced guidelines of Lenta.ru. Articles were published regarding the mass killing of civilians, looting, abandoned bodies of Russian troops, the destruction of Mariupol, censorship, governmental lies to relatives of deceased soldiers, attacks against the freedom of press, and more. Lenta.ru journalists Egor Polyakov and Alexandra Miroshnikova have stated that they were the authors of these articles, and reported that they now need new jobs, lawyers, and political asylum. The content was quickly removed, but can be found in Wayback Machine.

== Chief editors ==
- Anton Nosik (1999–2004)
- Galina Timchenko (2004–2014)
- Alexey Goreslavsky (2014–2016)
- Alexander Belonovsky (2016–2017)
- Vladimir Todorov (since 2017)

== Management ==
- Director-general: Andrey Solomennik
- Editor-in-Chief: Vladimir Todorov
- Programmer: Maksim Moshkow (until 2009)

== Awards and recognitions ==
Lenta.ru has taken first place four times in the Rotor contest in the category "Information site of the year" and once, in 2000 in the category "News site of the year".

Maxim Moshkov has won the Rotor twice (in the categories "Programmer of the Year" in 1999 and "Man of the Year" in 2005).
