= Galina Timchenko =

Russian journalist

- Галина Тимченко
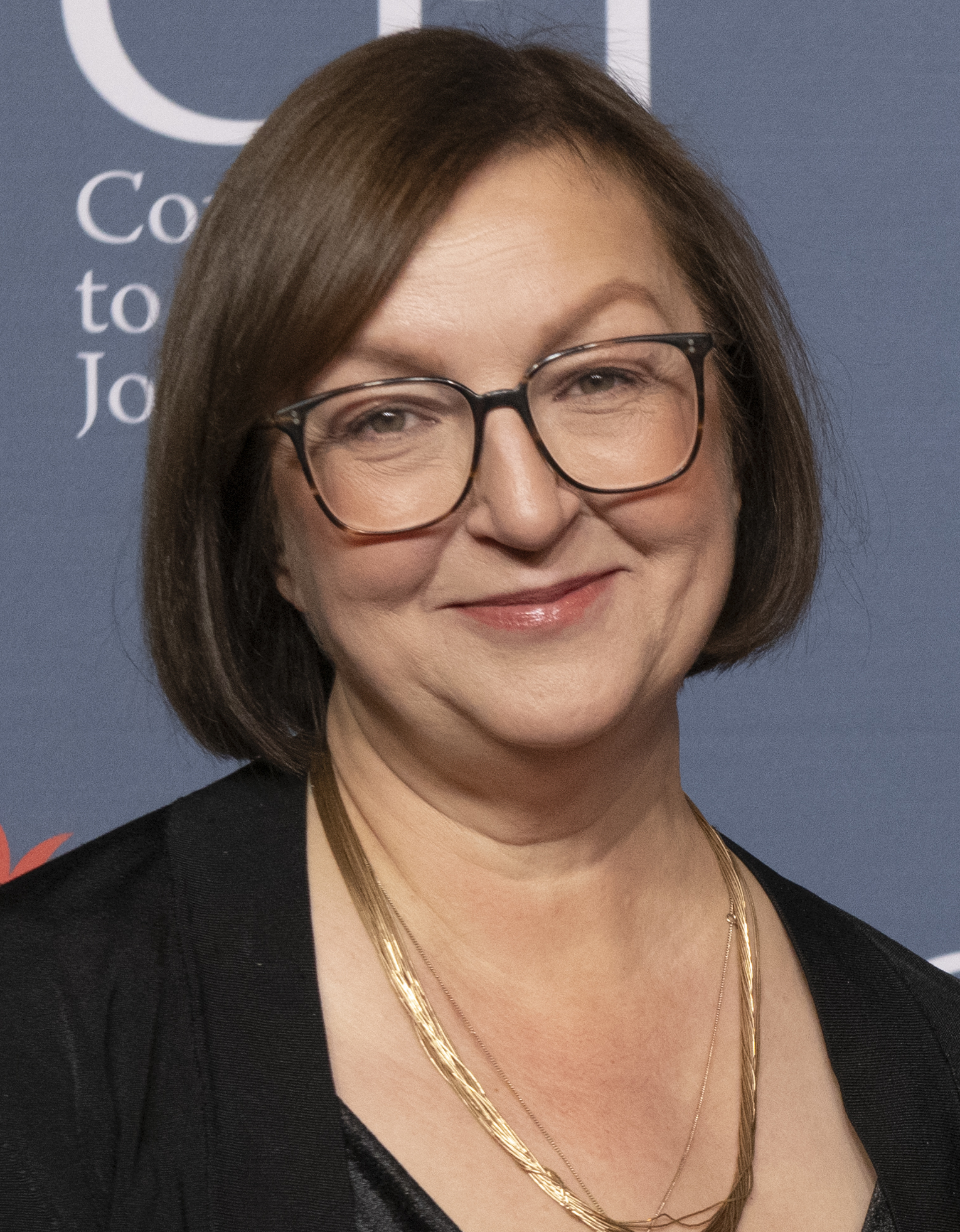
- Timchenko in 2022
- Born: Galina Viktorovna Timchenko; May 8, 1962 (age 64); Moscow, Soviet Union
- Citizenship: Russia (before 2019); Latvia (since 2019)
- Occupations: Chief Executive Officer, Meduza
- Notable credit(s): Kommersant, Lenta.ru, Meduza

Galina Viktorovna Timchenko (Russian: Гали́на Ви́кторовна Ти́мченко; born 8 May 1962) is a Russian-born Latvian journalist and the CEO, publisher and owner of Meduza.

== Early life and education ==
Timchenko was born in Moscow on 8 May 1962. She graduated from the 3rd Moscow Medical Institute. From 1997 to 1999, she worked as an editor at the Kommersant newspaper. In 1999, she moved to the newly created online edition Lenta.ru, having risen from the monitoring officer to chief editor. In 2004, she assumed the position of editor in chief.

== Career ==
In 2010, Harvard University conducted a study of the Russian blogosphere, and recognized Lenta.ru as the most widely quoted in the Russian-language blogs news source. According to research firm comScore, conducted in April 2013, the site Lenta.ru took 5th place in attendance of European news sites. According to Alexa.com in March 2014 Lenta.ru ranked 16th most popular in Russia.

On 12 March 2014, the owner, Alexander Mamut, fired Galina Timchenko and replaced her with Alexey Goreslavsky. 39 employees out of the total 84, including Director-general Yuliya Minder, including 32 correspondents, all 5 photo-editors and 6 administrators resigned as a result.

The employees of Lenta.ru issued a statement that the purpose of the move was to install a new Editor-in-Chief directly controlled by the Kremlin and turn the website into a propaganda tool. In October 2014, Timchenko together with several former journalists of Lenta.ru launched a new media based in Riga, named Meduza. Timchenko told Forbes that the decision to base Meduza in Latvia was made because "it is possible to establish an independent publishing house in Latvia, while in Russia it is impossible". In 2022, she received the Committee to Protect Journalists' (CJP) Gwen Ifill Press Freedom Award as Meduza's CEO and publisher for "extraordinary and sustained achievement in the cause of press freedom".

In 2023, her phone had been hacked with spyware Pegasus while she was in Germany. According to investigators, the attack could have come from Russia or a European Union state.
