= Meduza (website) =

Russian bilingual online newspaper headquartered in Riga, Latvia

Meduza Медуза
- Type: News website
- Owner: Galina Timchenko
- Founder(s): Galina Timchenko, Ivan Kolpakov, Ilya Krasilshchik
- Publisher: Galina Timchenko (since 2019)
- Editor-in-chief: Ivan Kolpakov
- Managing editor: Kevin Rothrock
- General manager: Galina Timchenko
- News editor: Eilish Hart
- Founded: 2014; 12 years ago
- Language: Russian; English
- Headquarters: Riga, Latvia
- Website: Russian: meduza.io English: meduza.io/en/

Meduza (Russian: Медуза, named after the Greek mythological figure Medusa) is a Russian- and English-language independent news website, headquartered in Riga, Latvia. It was founded in 2014 by a group of former employees of the then-independent Lenta.ru news website. Free mobile applications for iOS, Windows Phone, and Android became the basis of the media.

== History ==
In 2014, Galina Timchenko was fired from her job as chief editor at Lenta.ru by oligarch Alexander Mamut, a supporter of Vladimir Putin, after she had interviewed Right Sector leader Dmytro Yarosh. She launched the new webpage Meduza on 25 October 2014. Several former journalists of Lenta.ru joined the new online site.

Timchenko told Forbes that the decision to base Meduza in Latvia was made since "right now, establishing an independent Russian language publishing house in Latvia is possible, while in Russia it is not". Moreover, Timchenko stated: "We understood that in Russia, most likely, they would not let us work."

Russian businessman and former oligarch Mikhail Khodorkovsky and telecommunications magnate Boris Zimin had been considered as passive investors, but they parted ways "for strategic and operational reasons". Timchenko said Khodorkovsky had wanted 100 percent control of Meduza, which she considered unacceptable. For financial reasons, Timchenko and her partner at Amond & Smith Ltd, Sergey Nazarkin, based Meduza in Latvia.

In February 2015, the website also launched an English-language version. In January 2016, Timchenko handed over the role of chief editor to her deputy Ivan Kolpakov.

In August 2017, Meduza started a partnership with the American news website BuzzFeed News. The partnership included publishing each other's materials, sharing experiences, and carrying out and publishing joint investigations.

On 20 October 2018, at the outlet's annual celebration, Meduza chief editor and co-founder Ivan Kolpakov reportedly groped an employee's wife, saying, "You're the only one at this party I can harass and get away with it." Kolpakov was temporarily suspended until Meduza publicly censured and reinstated him. The incident triggered a social media backlash. On 9 November, Kolpakov announced his resignation, saying that "it is the only way to stop the crisis engulfing the website and minimize the damage to its reputation". He was reinstated as chief editor on 11 March 2019.

In 2019, Meduza started the English podcast The Naked Pravda, which highlights how Meduza's top reporting intersects with the wider research and expertise that exists about Russia.

In May 2022, Helsingin Sanomat began publishing individual Meduza articles translated in Finnish.

In February 2023, Timchenko's iPhone was targeted with Pegasus spyware. The attack occurred a day before a conference of exiled independent Russian media that was held in Berlin and which Timchenko attended; her phone could have been used to eavesdrop on the journalists' conversations during the conference. This attack is the first confirmed instance of Pegasus being used against a Russian journalist. It is unclear which state carried out the attack. Several employees of other independent Russian outlets, Current Time TV and Novaya Gazeta, received notifications from Apple that "state-sponsored attackers" may have attacked their phones as well.

From 26 April to 6 July 2025 in Berlin, Kunstraum Kreuzberg/Bethanien hosted No (Nein), curated by Meduza, consisting of an art exhibition by 13 invited international artists (anonymous artist, Aleksey Dubinsky, Alexander Gronsky, Semyon Khanin, Gülsün Karamustafa, Stine Marie Jacobsen, Teobaldo Lagos Preller, Cristina Lucas, Pavel Otdelnov, Sergei Prokofiev, Fernando Sánchez Castillo, SUPERFLEX, Pilvi Takala, and Alisa Yoffe) and a specifically commissioned video documentary presentation chronicling the last ten years of Meduza. The documentary was directed by exiled Russian playwright Mikhail Durnenkov and featured interviews of Meduza contributors (Taisia Bekbulatova, Elena Kostyuchenko, Svetlana Reiter Lilia Yapparova, Zhenia Berezhna, Anton Dolin, Alexander Gronsky, Ivan Kolpakov, Galina Timchenko, and others) with support from Helsingin Sanomat Foundation, Fritt Ord Foundation, Stichting Editors Choice, JX Fund, Network of Exiled Media Outlets, and Committee to Protect Journalists.

== Funding ==
Meduza sources its funding from crowdfunding and international organizations. In September 2025, Meduza released an appeal for donations, citing the criminalization of Meduza by the government of Russia (ending advertising and donations from Russian sources), and the demise of foreign assistance from USAID. About 15% of Meduza's annual budget came from programs funded by the US government, until foreign assistance was cut off in February 2025.

== Structure ==
By 2014 Meduza had a team of around 20 journalists. No Latvian journalists contribute to the project.

Since March 2015, Meduza has published a daily news called "Evening Meduza".

In September 2022, it announced the creation of English email dispatch "The Beet", aiming to amplify "local perspectives" from Central/Eastern Europe, the Caucasus and Central Asia, "without centering Moscow". Its debut article was titled 'Suing Gorbachev' and explored Soviet violence in the Baltic states under Mikhail Gorbachev.

== Audience ==
Three months after opening, Meduza had 1.3 million monthly readers of its Internet publication. In 2017, Meduza had 7.5 million readers per month and 2 million followers on social media. In 2020, Meduza was the leading Russian site in social media links, according to Medialogia, a company that monitors and analyzes exclusively Russian sites on media and social networks. By March 2022, Meduza's website had between 12 and 18 million monthly visitors. The majority of readers are younger than 45.

Meduza grants open source access to all of its coverage of the war in Ukraine under a Creative Commons license. The articles can be reprinted in full (CC BY 4.0, does not apply to photos).

== Censorship ==
Meduza aims to fill a market niche that exists due to "a long list of forbidden topics which Russian media do not raise for various reasons—due to direct and indirect censorship".

The day after it was launched (in October 2014), Meduza was blocked in Kazakhstan, probably due to an article about the city of Oskemen (Ust-Kamenogorsk).

By October 2016, access to the site was also blocked in Uzbekistan.

By 15 April 2016, Meduza reported installing technical measures to circumvent censorship with their mobile apps.

In June 2019, Meduza journalist Ivan Golunov was arrested by Russian police for claimed drug offences. Colleagues and friends of Golunov said they believed the charges to be fabricated, motivated by his investigations into corruption. Following a public outcry, Golunov was released, and five police officers were fired and later arrested.

On 23 April 2021, the Russian Ministry of Justice designated Meduza as a foreign agent. In response, the European Union rejected the decision, saying this restriction "goes against Russia's international obligations and human rights commitments". Russia's actions caused financial difficulties for Meduza, as they stopped many advertisers from Russia, which were the portal's main source of income, from displaying their ads at Meduza's pages. This resulted in an international campaign to collect funds to ensure Meduza's survival through donations and buying subscriptions. Timchenko said the designation made it even harder to obtain sources that are willing to talk to the reporters – especially without the protection of anonymity.

Meduza published an editorial condemning the Russian invasion of Ukraine on 24 February 2022; due to its coverage of the invasion, the site was blocked on the territory of Russia by Roskomnadzor among other news websites due to the "systematic dissemination of fakes". Despite the actions of Roskomnadzor, Meduza managed to maintain most of its Russian readers, but the economic sanctions imposed on Russia over its invasion of Ukraine also hit Meduza's finances, as the sanctions made it nearly impossible to send donations from Russia and 30,000 members across the Russian border were suddenly unable to donate to the website. As a result, Meduza launched a campaign seeking donations from new supporters outside of Russia. On March 11, Reporters Without Borders announced a mirror site has been set up. Russian journalist Ilya Krasilshchik, the former publisher of Meduza, was charged under the "fake news" law for denouncing the war in Ukraine.

On 26 January 2023, the Russian prosecutor-general's office designated Meduza as an undesirable organization in Russia. In March 2023, Timchenko said that while "Russian propaganda has enormous financial sources" and the government can spend billions to spread disinformation, Meduza has a "little crowdfunding campaign by people of good will around the world, and some support from international organizations".

Meduza has implemented technical solutions to bypass Russian censorship, including reliance on mobile apps and the ability to save articles as PDF files.

== Criticism ==
In December 2022, the independent outlet Proekt criticized Meduza for publishing, on numerous occasions, unverified claims coming from unnamed officials in the Putin's administration. The number of "exclusive articles" coming from such sources has significantly increased, especially since the start of the Russian invasion of Ukraine.

== Awards ==
- 2016 – Ilnur Sharafiev received the Redkollegia award for the article 18 thousand rubles per person published in Meduza.
- 2022 – Galina Timchenko received the Committee to Protect Journalists' (CPJ) Gwen Ifill Press Freedom Award as Meduza's CEO and publisher for "extraordinary and sustained achievement in the cause of press freedom".
- 2022 – The Fritt Ord Prize for courageous, independent and fact-based journalism. "Prix Spécial" du Prix Franco-Allemand du Journalisme/Deutsch-Französischer Journalistenpreis.

== See also ==
- Novaya Gazeta
- Segodnya
- TV Rain
- Spektr.press
