= Zoya Svetova =

Russian journalist and human rights defender (born 1959)

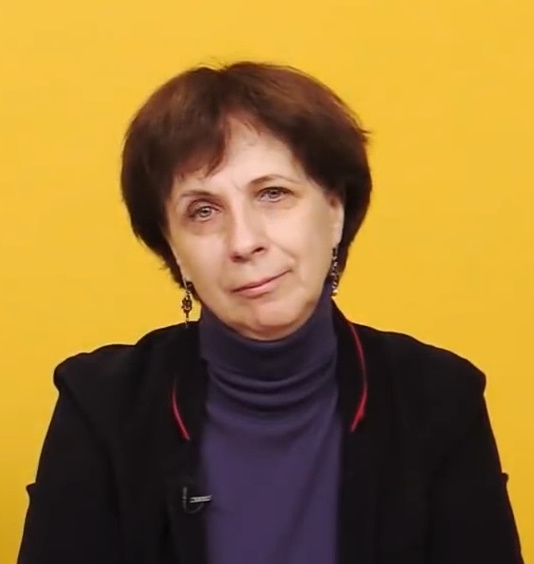
- Occupations: Human rights defender, journalist
- Employer: mbkhmedia (–2021)
- Spouse: Viktor Dzyadko
- Children: Filipp Dzyadko, Timofey Dzyadko, Tikhon Dzyadko, Anna Dzyadko
- Parents: Felix Svetov (father); Zoya Krakhmalnikova (mother)
- Awards: Free Media Awards (2009); Diploma of the Andrei Sakharov Prize "For Journalism as a Deed" (2003, 2004); Chevalier of the Legion of Honour (2021)

Zoya Feliksovna Svetova (Russian: Зоя Феликсовна Светова; born March 17, 1959) is a Russian journalist and human rights defender, producer, author of the documentary novel Innocent Found Guilty (Russian: Признать невиновного виновным).

== Biography ==
In 1982 she graduated from the Maurice Thorez Moscow State Pedagogical Institute of Foreign Languages.

In 2000–2002, she was an expert at the Soros Foundation on programmes related to the development of law, the judiciary and the topic of human rights in Russia.

In 2008–2016, she worked at the Public Monitoring Commission (PMC) of Moscow. In 2016, she was nominated to the Mordovian PMC, but was not included in its composition.

=== Work in the media ===
- 1991—1993 — Family and School magazine
- 1993—2001 – columnist for the Russkaya mysl newspaper
- 1994—1999 – assistant to the correspondent of the Moscow bureau Radio France
- 1999—2001 – assistant correspondent of the Moscow bureau of the Libération newspaper
- 2001—2003 – correspondent of the Man and Circumstances section of the Novye Izvestia newspaper
- 2002—2004 – representative in Moscow of the Reporters Without Borders organisation
- 2003—2004 – special correspondent of the policy department of the Russkiy Kurier daily newspaper
- 2004—2005 – editor of the department of internal policy of Russkiy Kurier
- since December 2009 – columnist for The New Times magazine

She published articles in the newspapers Kommersant, Russian Telegraph, Obshchaya Gazeta, Novaya Gazeta, Moskovskiye Novosti, Ogoniok, Itogi, Yezhenedelny Zhurnal, as well as in French-language publications: Ouest-France, France Soir, La Dépêche du Midi, Le quotidien (Luxembourg).

She worked as a producer on the France 2 TV channel.

== Political position ==
In September 2014, she signed a statement from the December 12 Round Table demanding the withdrawal of Russian troops from Ukraine. In November 2019, she signed a collective appeal in support of Gasan Gusejnov.

In September 2020, she signed a letter in support of protest actions in Belarus.

== Bibliography ==
2011 — Innocent Found Guilty (Russian: Признать невиновного виновным) documentary novel.

== Awards ==
- Laureate of the "Arbitrariness in the Law" journalism award in 2003 in the "Violation of individual rights nomination".
- Laureate of the National Press Prize of the Union of Journalists of the Russian Federation and Amnesty International for 2003 Human Rights and Strengthening Civil Society in Russia.
- Diploma of the Andrei Sakharov Prize For journalism as a deed in 2003 and 2004.
- Winner of the 2009 Gerd Bucerius Prize.
- Winner of the Moscow Helsinki Group Human Rights Prize in 2010.
- Laureate of the publicistic prize Libmission 2018 in the nomination "For courage in upholding liberal values" for a series of publications on the portals MBH.media and Radio Liberty, dedicated to people who have been imprisoned.
- Chevalier (Knight) of the Legion of Honour (2020).
