= Felix Svetov =

Russian writer and journalist (1927–2002)

- Феликс Светов
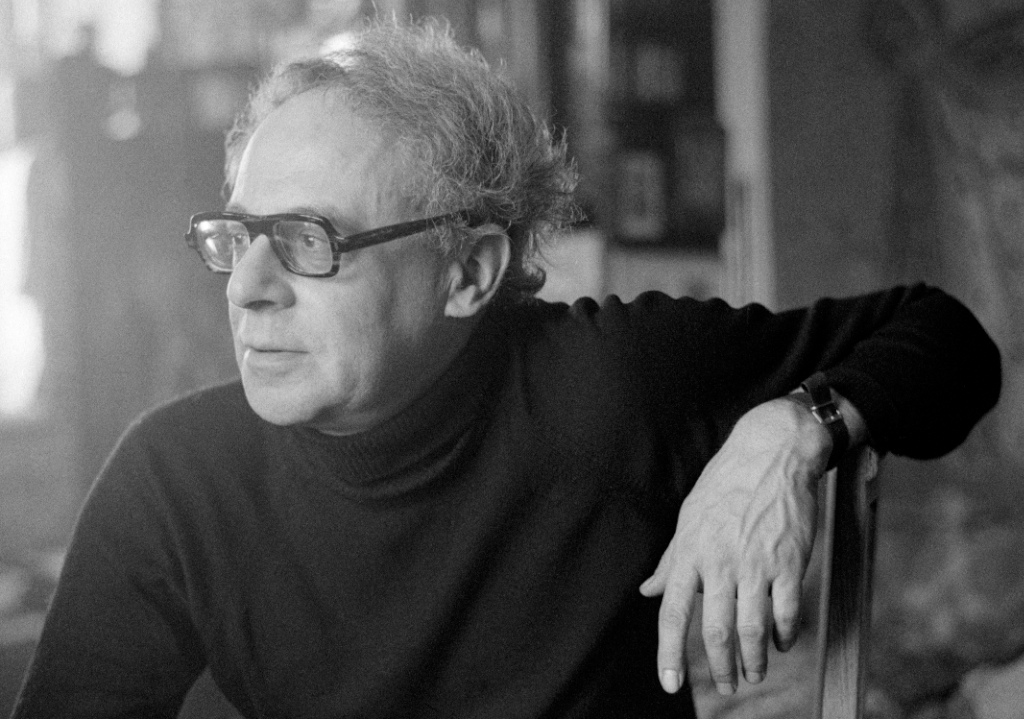
- Svetov in 1981
- Born: 28 November 1927; Moscow (Soviet Union)
- Died: 2 September 2002 (aged 74); Moscow
- Resting place: Troyekurovskoye cemetery
- Other names: Ф. Корсаков
- Alma mater: Philological Faculty of Moscow State University
- Occupation: Writer, journalist, human rights defender, literary critic
- Spouse(s): Zoya Krakhmalnikova
- Children: Zoya Svetova

Felix Grigoryevich Svetov (Russian: Феликс Григорьевич Светов; 28 November 1927 – 2 September 2002) was a Russian writer, journalist, human rights activist and dissident. He received wide recognition for his novels and short stories, published exclusively in samizdat and tamizdat. He was also included in the Literary Collection of Aleksandr Solzhenitsyn. Svetov was persecuted for his human rights activities in the USSR.

== Biography ==
Felix Grigoryevich Fridlyand was born on 28 November 1927 in Moscow, USSR to Soviet historian Grigory Fridlyand and his wife, Nekhama (Nadezhda) Lvovna Fridlyand (Russian: Нехама (Надежда) Львовна Фридлянд). In 1937, when Felix was nine years old, his father was murdered by the Soviet authorities during the Great Purge. His mother was sentenced to eight years in a work camp in Potma, Zubovo-Polyansky District, Republic of Mordovia. In 1951, having changed his surname to Svetov, he graduated from the Faculty of Philology of Moscow State University.

From 1952 to 1954 he worked as a journalist on Sakhalin Island, USSR. Then he returned to Moscow and started publishing literary critical articles and reviews in Moscow newspapers and magazines, most often in the Novy Mir literary journal. Between 1950 and 1960, Svetov published hundreds of articles and reviews, as well as four scientific papers, including the monograph Mikhail Svetov (Михаил Светов; 1967). He spoke in defence of Andrei Sinyavsky, Yuli Daniel and Aleksandr Solzhenitsyn. In 1974, Solzhenitsyn's collection From Under the Rocks was published in France, in which Svetov published the Russian Fates (Русские судьбы) article under the pseudonym F. Korsakov (Ф. Корсаков). Svetov was married to writer Zoya Krakhmalnikova.

In 1978, Svetov's novel "Open the Doors to Me" (Отверзи ми двери) was published in Paris. At that time, he and his wife were no longer published in official Soviet publications, they were subjected to pressure from the authorities. In 1982, he was expelled from Union of Soviet Writers, and, on 23 January 1985, he was arrested after a search of his apartment. He was convicted for his "defamatory" allegations that "innocent people [were] thrown into prison" in the USSR. The government perceived it as anti-Soviet propaganda.

After a year in the Matrosskaya Tishina prison, he was sentenced to 5 years of exile and sent to Altai to his wife. While being exiled they were asked to write a "statement requesting a pardon", but they refused to do so.

In 1987, Svetov and Krakhmalnikova were released and returned to Moscow as part of Gorbachev's democratic campaign to free political prisoners. In 1990, Svetov was reinstated in Union of Soviet Writers. Many of his works have been published in the West. In Russia, he was published in the magazines Frontiers, Syntax, and Nadezhda.

Svetov was a member of the Russian PEN Club. Since 2000 he also was a member of the pardon commission under the president of Russia, but in 2001 Vladimir Putin closed the commission. Svetov said that "Putin is a typical KGB type. If the snow is falling, they will calmly tell you, the sun is shining."

Svetov died on 2 September 2002, aged 74, in Moscow due to a myocardial infarction and was buried in Moscow at the Troyekurovskoye Cemetery. Sergei Chuprinin, the editor-in-chief of Znamya, said Svetov "thought first of all about making people freer".

== Awards and nominations ==
In 1985, Svetov received the literary Dal Prize for his book An Experiment in Biography (Russian: Опыт Биографии; 1985).

On 7 January 2002, Svetov received gratitude from the president of Russia for his active participation in the work of the pardon commission under the president of Russia.

In 2002, Svetov's novel Chizhik-Pyzhik (reference to the original Chizhik-Pyzhik) was nominated for the Ivan Petrovich Belkin Prize.

== Legacy and bibliography ==
2006 The Special Jury Award, Prize for Human Rights at the International Human Rights Film Festival "Stalker" was named after Svetov. Russian journalist Zoya Svetova is a daughter of Svetov.

- Ушла ли романтика? Критические размышления. Sovetsky Pisatel. 1963.
- Поиски и свершения. Заметки о современности искусства. Искусство. 1965.
- Михаил Светов. Худ. лит. 1967.
