= Otto Latsis =

Russian journalist (1934-2005)

- Отто Рудольфович Лацис
- Born: Otto Rudolfovich Latsis; 22 June 1934; Moscow, Russian SFSR, Soviet Union
- Died: 3 November 2005 (aged 71); Moscow, Russia
- Education: Moscow State University
- Occupation: Journalist
- Years active: 1950s–2000s

Otto Rudolfovich Latsis (Latvian: Otto Lācis, Russian: Отто Рудольфович Лацис; 22 June 1934 – 3 November 2005) was a Soviet and Russian journalist, of Latvian descent.

== Journalist career ==
After graduating from Moscow State University in 1956, Otto Latsis began working in a local newspaper, "Soviet Sakhalin". His subsequent work at the newspaper "Экономическая Газета" (The Economic Gazette), began build Latsis' reputation as a prominent journalist. At the end of the Khrushchev Thaw, he worked at Izvestia, where he advocated for the loosening of censorship and sought to make the newspaper popular among the intelligentsia.

His liberal views proved unpopular with authorities. Latsis was sent into a so-called "exile of honour", that is, to work in a place where he would not have a platform to spread his ideas. He worked in Prague for a magazine called "Problems of Peace and Socialism", later at the Moscow Institute of the Economy of the World Social System.

From 1987 to 1991 he returned to occupy an important position in the Soviet magazine "Communist"—in theory, a magazine intended to be a vehicle for promulgating communist propaganda, but which under Latsis spread the idea of perestroika.

After 1991, he returned to work at Izvestia. In 1996, due to the federal handling of the Kizlyar–Pervomayskoye hostage crisis, he left the Russian Presidential Advisory Board. In 1997, because of a conflict with its new management, he left it to found his own newspaper, "New Izvestia." He subsequently moved to "Russkii Kurier," and lastly, to "Moskovskiye Novosti."

Latsis also wrote and presented papers at academic symposia.

== Activities not related to journalism ==
- Under Mikhail Gorbachev, he was a member of the Central Committee of the Communist Party.
- Under Boris Yeltsin, he was one of his advice councilors.
- He was a member of the jury of the award "For Journalism as Deed" (За журналистику как поступок).
- He was a member of the public commission investigating Russian apartment bombings.

== Death ==
On September 10. 2005, while Latsis was driving his Peugeot and turning left at a crossroad, a jeep crashed into his car at a high speed. Latsis and his grandson, as well as the woman who was driving the jeep and her two children, were hospitalized for treatment. Latsis lingered in a coma for more than one and a half months, but finally succumbed to his injuries. He died on November 3, 2005, in Burdenko Main Military Clinical Hospital, Moscow.

== Opinions on Otto Latsis ==
Otto was one of the most talented Russian journalists. He was among people who could stick to their beliefs and do not abolish them when they are forced to. <...> He combined the excellent knowledge of economy and the ability to write so that his articles were clear to everyone. Besides, he was writing amazingly quickly. I was always impressed with his ability to write a great article in 1.5 hours.

— Yegor Gaidar

He was a talented analyst of economy and an excellent journalist. Besides, he always helped our department and students. After all, he was a fine man.

— Yasen Zasurski, Dean of the Department of journalism in Moscow State University
