= Church of Mary Magdalene, Mariupol =

Church of Mary Magdalene

Church of Mary Magdalene
- Церква Марії Магдалини
- Second Church of Mary Magdalene
- Church of Mary Magdalene
- 47°05′46″N 37°32′55″E
- Country: Ukraine
- Language(s): Ukrainian, Russian
- Denomination: Orthodox

History
- Status: Demolished
- Consecrated: 1791, 1897

Architecture
- Demolished: 1891, 1934

The Church of Mary Magdalene (Ukrainian: Церква Марії Магдалини; Russian: Церковь Марии Магдалины) was an Orthodox church in honor of the Apostle Mary Magdalene in Mariupol, Ukraine. Consecrated in 1897, it was a replacement of a church of the same name that was consecrated in 1791. The church was later purposefully destroyed in the 1930s during the Soviet era. It stood within the vicinity of what is known today as Theatre Square where the Donetsk Regional Drama Theatre was built in 1960.

== The first Church of Mary Magdalene ==
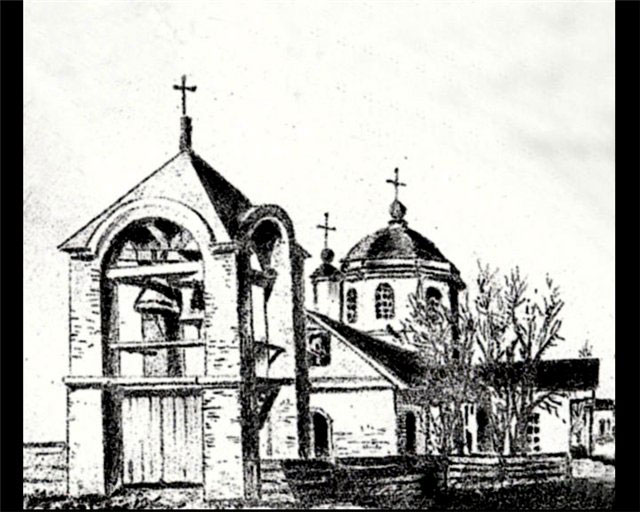
First Church of Mary Magdalene, Mariupol

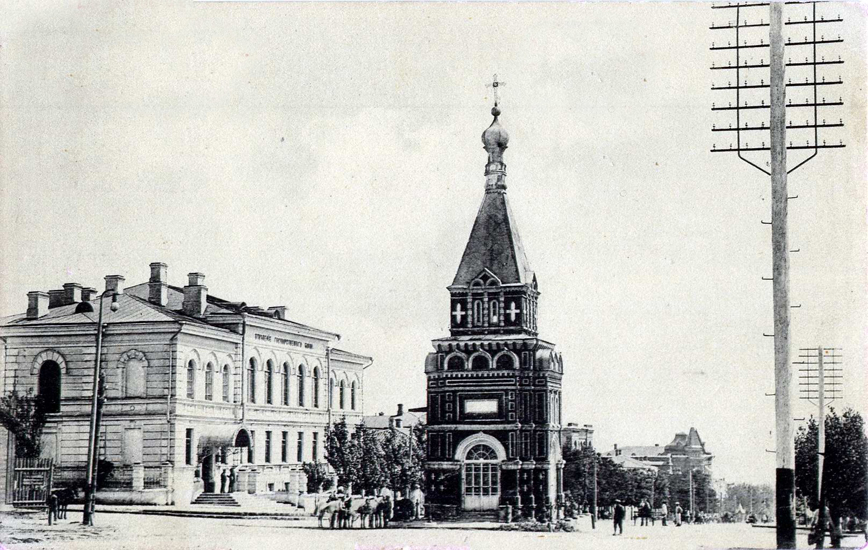
Chapel on Ekaterininskaya Street, early 20th century

The history of the Church of Mary Magdalene begins as early as 1778, when Mariupol was not yet inhabited by Greeks and was called Pavlovsk.

Azov Governor Vasily Chertkov, as stated in the chapter "Orthodox Churches in Mariupol" of the local historians collection "Mariupol and its environs", decided to build the main church of the city. It was named Mary Magdalene after Grand Duchess Maria Fedorovna, the wife of the heir to the throne of the Russian Empire, Pavel Petrovich, who later became Emperor Paul I.

Foundations were laid and walls erected, but after the resettlement of people from the Crimean Khanate (Orthodox Greeks, Armenians and Bulgarians who were relocated by the tsarist state from the Crimea), Pavlovsk was renamed Mariupol, the new church passed to the care of the settlers and its completion was delayed. Upon the request of Bishop Dorotheus of Mariupol to the Ekaterinoslav State Chamber, the unfinished church was transferred to the "Little Russian nation", which completed and decorated the church at its own expense. Another source informs that the church was given to Ukrainians (former Cossacks) who lived in the suburbs, because they did not have their own church.

The church was consecrated on June 4, 1791, to serve the Orthodox population and was located on Peace Avenue (Ukrainian: Проспект Миру) where it intersects with Grecheskaya Street (Hretska Street).

Peace Avenue was originally known as Bolshaya Street, but renamed several times: in 1876 to Ekaterininskaya Street, in 1917 to Republic Avenue, in 1960 to Vladimir Lenin Avenue to commemorate the 90th anniversary of his birth, and in 2016 to its current name of Peace Avenue.

In 1811, the church in the name of Mary Magdalene was marked as a cathedral on the city plan.

The wooden structures of the church fell into disrepair over time. First, the wooden bell tower was dismantled, later the iconostasis was replaced, and in 1891, the church was closed and dismantled. Construction technology was so imperfect at the time, that none of the churches of that era survived.

In its place a chapel was erected in memory of the life of the heir Nikolai Alexandrovich. It was consecrated on May 5, 1895, but demolished in 1933, by the Soviet state, as it interfered with the construction of a double-track tramway on Republic Avenue, now called Peace Avenue (Myru Ave).

== The second Church of Mary Magdalene ==
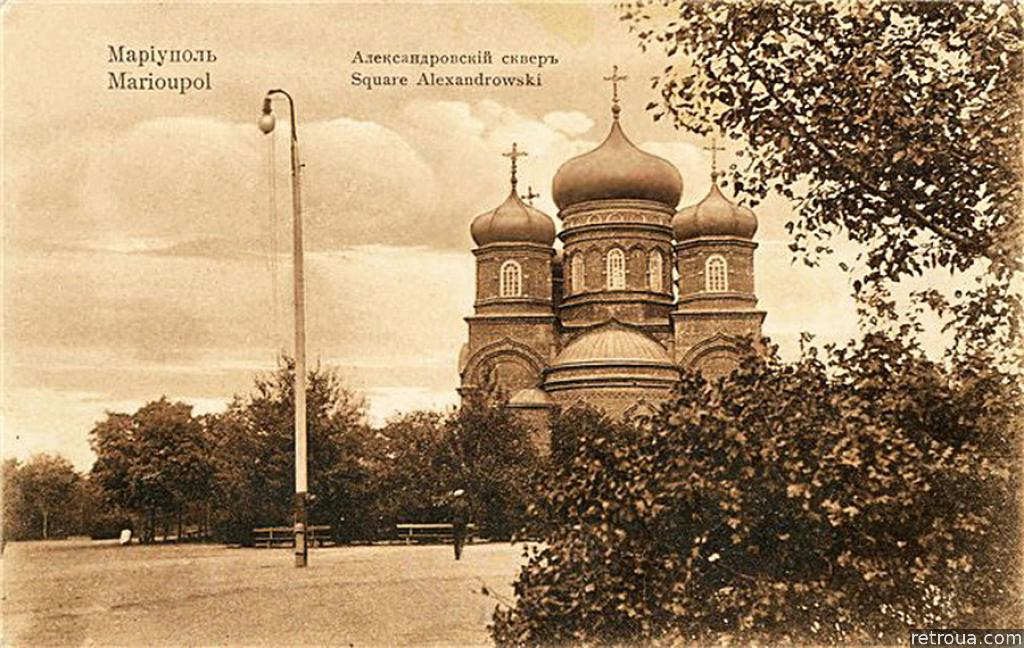
Second church of Mary Magdalene, Mariupol

Second church of Mary Magdalene, Mariupol

The dilapidated condition of the old Church of Mary Magdalene prompted the planning for a new one. Its foundations were laid in 1862 on top of a hill a little higher and west of the old one, on Alexander Square.

Construction was delayed until 1888, when the City Duma considered the original church in too bad a condition for use. The Duma ordered to issue the construction committee 2,000 Rubles annually, starting 1889, to continue construction work.

Father Prokofiy Orlovsky, the rector of the new Church of Mary Magdalene, was elected chairman of the committee and the board of trustees.

According to recollections of the era, the church kept the altar icon of the Saviour of time and an ancient, embroidered shroud. Bishop Simeon of Ekaterinoslav Taganrog arrived in Mariupol "to inspect the church and schools of the Mariupol district”, and to conduct the consecration of the new Church of Mary Magdalene on October 16, 1897. It became the second-largest church in Mariupol after Kharlampievsky Cathedral (Ukrainian: Харлампієвський собор), which stood at the very beginning of Catherine Street (Ukrainian: Катерининська вулиця).

The church was built of brick in the pseudo-Byzantine architectural style and had three domes and three chapels in honour of St. Mary Magdalene, St. John the Baptist and in memory of the Intercession of the Blessed Virgin, consecrated and celebrated the Divine Liturgy.

The new church stood until it was demolished in 1934 by order of the Bolshevik government as part of the Godless Five-Year Plan. The remains of Metropolitan Ignatius were moved to the Mariupol Museum of Local Lore. By the end of the 1930s, there were virtually no Christian churches left standing in the city.

The vacant square was turned into a Soviet square with a fountain. In 1960, the Donetsk Regional Drama Theatre was built on the site. As a result of excavations in 2018, fragments of the church's foundation were unearthed near the theatre and placed under a protective dome for exhibition. Also, a bronze model of the church of Mary Magdalene was installed under a glass cover.
