= Maria Ponomarenko =

Russian journalist (born 1978)

- Мария Пономаренко
- Born: 5 September 1978 (age 47); Barnaul, Altai Krai, Russian SSR, USSR
- Citizenship: Russia
- Occupation: Journalist
- Employer: RusNews
- Known for: Reporting on the Mariupol theatre airstrike
- Criminal charges: Discrediting the Russian Armed Forces
- Criminal penalty: 6 years imprisonment
- Criminal status: Detained

Maria Nikolayevna Ponomarenko (Russian: Мария Николаевна Пономаренко; born 5 September 1978) is a Russian journalist and human rights activist. In 2023, she was sentenced to six years in prison for her reporting on the Mariupol theatre airstrike.

== Biography ==
Ponomarenko was born and raised in Barnaul, Altai Krai, in what was then the Russian Soviet Federative Socialist Republic within the Soviet Union.

Ponomarenko worked as a journalist for the Siberian branch of the Russian outlet RusNews, which published stories on Telegram. In March 2022, she published a story on RusNews' Tsenzury net (lit. 'No Censorship') channel about citizens of Mariupol, Ukraine, who had been killed when the Russian Armed Forces bombed the Donetsk Academic Regional Drama Theatre on 16 March, as well as those injured. The attack had been described as a war crime by Amnesty International.

In April 2022, Ponomarenko was arrested by Russian authorities, who accused her of "discrediting the Russian Armed Forces" in her article which was described as including untrue information about the airstrike. She was held in pre-trial detention until November 2022, when she was released under house arrest. In January 2023, Ponomarenko was placed back in pre-trial detention after running away from her home which was stated due to her being forced to live at the same address as her abusive ex-husband. Ponomarenko stated that she had attempted suicide in September 2022 while detained.

On 15 February 2023, Ponomarenko was sentenced to six years' imprisonment by the Leninsky Court in Barnaul. In her final statement, Ponomarenko had criticised the use of military censorship against her when the Russian government stated that the conflict in Ukraine was not a war but a special operation. She also criticised the use of V and Z symbols as representative of a totalitarian regime, and stating that "a totalitarian regime is always at its strongest just before it falls".

On 15 May 2023, Ponomarenko was transferred to Penal Camp No. 22 in Krasnoyarsk.

In 2024, Ponomarenko went on hunger strike over prison conditions, requiring hospitalisation after 149 days. In 2025, she was sentenced to an additional year and ten months' imprisonment after allegedly assaulting two prison guards, a charge she denied. During the trial, Ponomarenko criticised Vladimir Putin and stated she was not proud of her country, comparing it to an alcoholic mother.

== Response ==
Ponomarenko's arrest and imprisonment was criticised by various human rights organisations, including PEN International and Amnesty International which called for her release, citing article 19 of the Universal Declaration of Human Rights, as well as the Constitution of Russia. Amnesty International described her as a prisoner of conscience; an appeal against her detention was led by the human rights group Memorial.

In 2023, Ponomarenko was awarded the 2023 Boris Nemtsov Prize.
