= Zoya Krakhmalnikova =

Soviet Christian writer (1929–2008)

Zoya Alexandrovna Krakhmalnikova (Russian: Зоя Александровна Крахмальникова; January 14, 1929 – April 17, 2008) was a Russian Christian writer, of Ukrainian origin. She was an activist and former Soviet dissident who was repeatedly arrested by the authorities of the former Soviet Union for her publications. She was a recipient of the Andrei Sakharov Prize for Writer's Civic Courage.

== Early life and career ==
Krakhmalnikova was born in the city of Kharkov, Ukraine on January 14, 1929. Her father was arrested in 1936 during one of Joseph Stalin's many purges. She graduated from the Gorky Literary Institute in 1954 in Moscow and completed her postgraduate work at the Gorky Institute of World Literature despite her family's background. An avid scholarly writer, Krakhmalnikova was publishing articles in Soviet literary journals by the 1960s. She became a member of the Soviet Academy of Sciences' Institute of Sociology in 1967.

Her husband was fellow author Feliks Svetov.

== Dissident ==
Zoya Krakhmalnikova was baptized into the Russian Orthodox Church in 1971, which led to her being fired from her job. Her baptism also led to her dismissal from the USSR Union of Writers, which meant that she could no longer publish any of her work in the Soviet Union. Instead, Krakhmalnikova turned her attention to writing articles concerning Christianity in the Soviet Union, many of which she sent outside of the country to be published.

In 1976, she began publishing Nadezhda (Hope), which was a revival of a pre-revolutionary Christian journal. She focused her publication on the history of the Russian Orthodox Church, not to attack Soviet authorities for their policies or human rights abuses. However, the journal also explored the subject of what it called "new martyrs", who were victims of the Communist rule.

Posev, which was a Russian emigre publishing house based in West Germany, began printing copies of Nadezhda once it received the typescripts. Copies of Nadezhda were then smuggled back into the Soviet Union.

Krakhmalnikova was arrested at 4:00 a.m. on August 4, 1982, at her dacha. A total of ten issues, with several others published anonymously, had been published by the time she was arrested. She spent almost a year at the Lefortovo prison awaiting trial. Soviet authorities charged Krakhmalnikova with deliberately sending articles by a Russian Orthodox priest, Fr. Dmitri Dudko, out of the U.S.S.R. to be published abroad. She pleaded not guilty to all charges on April 1, 1983.

She was ultimately convicted. Her sentence was called lenient by the state run Soviet news agency, Tass. However, the Soviet press omitted the fact that her official prison sentence at Lefortovo was to be followed by a five-year exile at the remote settlement of Ust-Kan, which is located in Russia's Altai Republic, much closer to Mongolia than Moscow. She was allowed visits once a month from her husband and daughter, but was not allowed to visit a church. She did put up a few traditional Orthodox icons and a Bible in small corner of her room. She had no access to a priest while living in Ust-Kan.

Her husband, Feliks Svetov, an author and Russian Orthodox activist, was later arrested and also sent into internal exile in Siberia. Svetov was one of the Soviet Union's last dissidents of the Soviet Union who were arrested for religious oppression. He was sentenced in January 1986, just ten months after Mikhail Gorbachev became general secretary. The couple refused to "repent" for their so-called crimes, but were still granted a pardon in July 1987. Following her release, Krakhmalnikova became a pro-democracy activist and publicly called on the Russian Orthodox Church to apologize for its collaboration with Soviet authorities, which, as of 2008, it still has not done.

Krakhmalnikova later wrote her autobiography, which was published in the United States, but not the United Kingdom. Following the dissolution of the Soviet Union, Krakhmalnikova never became a high-profile Russian figure and was little known in Western Europe or the United States. However, she remained influential within her group of friends, activists and supporters.

== Death ==
Krakhmalnikova died on April 17, 2008, at the age of 79.
