= Pravo.ru =

Russian online magazine

- Founded: 2008
- Headquarters: Pozharsky Alley 15, Moscow, 119034, Russia
- Key people: Boris Boltyansky
- Products: News media, Legal journalism
- Website: www.pravo.ru

The Pravo.ru is a Russian online media specializing in legal journalism.

The company, which owns the magazine, also is the developer of the self-titled reference legal system and carries out maintenance of electronic services of the arbitration courts.

== History ==
The Pravo.ru was founded in 2008 by businessman Dmitriy Chirakadze and designer Aleksei Pelevin. In the absence of competition, the Pravo.ru quickly became a popular in Russian community of lawyers.

== Activity ==
The Pravo.ru publishes news on legal subjects, legal reviews, interviews with distinguished lawyers.

Since 2010, the Pravo.ru compiles a ranking of Russian law firms in different areas of law.

In 2022, the Pravo.ru established an annual award in the field of legal marketing.
