= Moscow BMW billboard =

The Moscow BMW billboard was unveiled in 2008 as one of the largest and most elaborate billboards in the world. The billboard had an area of 1.5 acres and depicted an expressway, containing real, full-sized BMWs. At night, the headlights of the cars are lit up. The car models on the billboard were the BMW M Coupe, the BMW M3, the BMW M5, and BMW M6.
