= Mariupol theatre airstrike =

Russian war crime during the invasion of Ukraine

- Part of the siege of Mariupol during the 2022 Russian invasion of Ukraine and the Russo-Ukrainian war (2022–present)
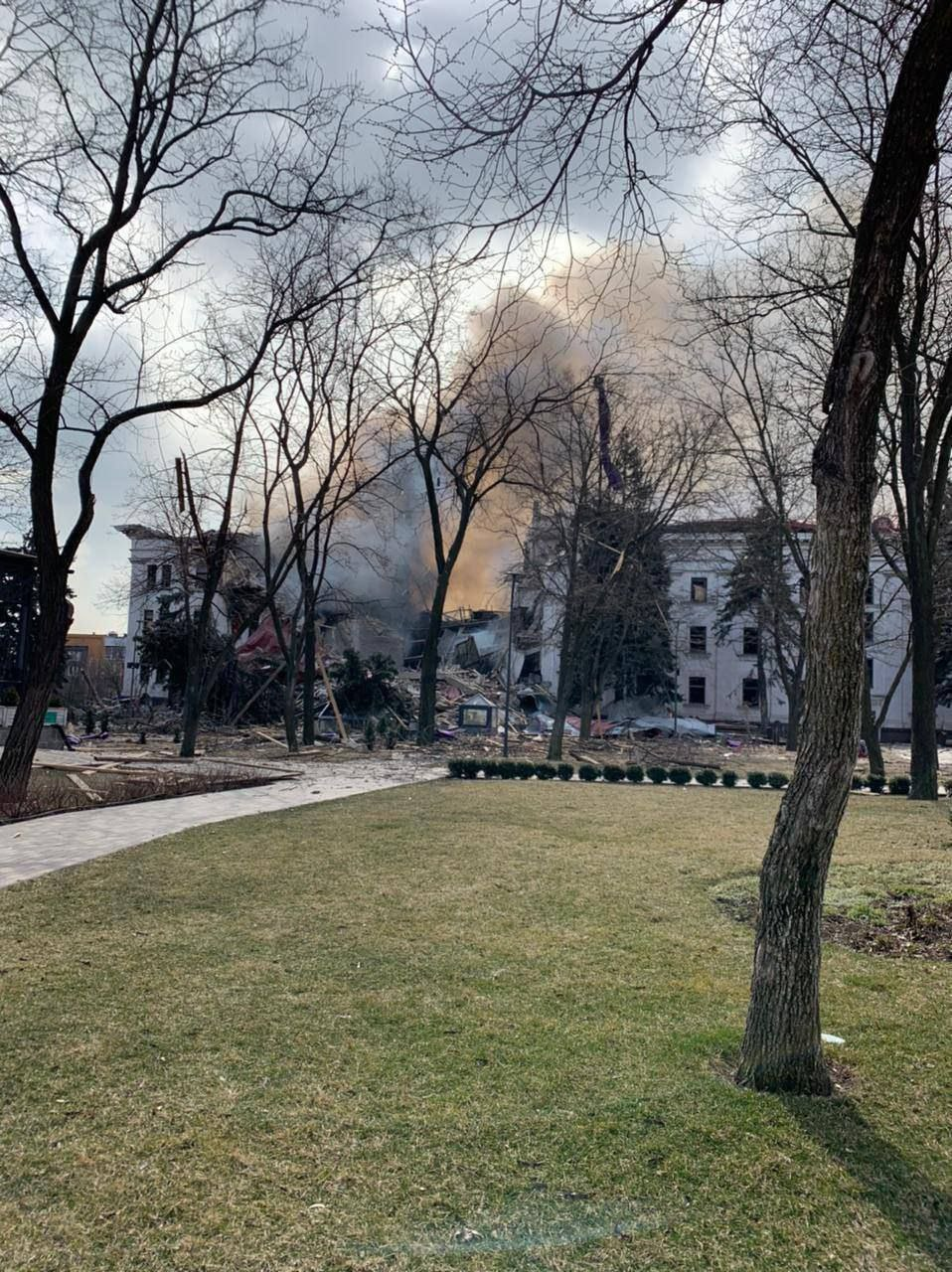
- Damage to the theatre after the airstrike
- Location: Donetsk Regional Drama Theatre; Mariupol, Ukraine
- Date: 16 March 2022 (UTC+3)
- Target: Civilians using the theatre as an air raid shelter
- Attack type: Airstrike
- Deaths: Estimates range from at least a dozen to over 600 people
- Perpetrator: Russian Armed Forces

On 16 March 2022, during the Russian invasion of Ukraine, the Russian Armed Forces bombed the Mariupol theatre in Mariupol, Ukraine. It was used as an air raid shelter during the siege of Mariupol, sheltering a large number of civilians. The estimations of the number of deaths that occurred due to the bombing have varied, from at least 12 and "likely many more" (Amnesty International) to as many as 600 (Associated Press). (Note: At least 11 (eleven) are confirmed by a Russian source.)

The Ukrainian government accused the Russian Armed Forces of deliberately bombing the theatre while it was sheltering civilians. Russia denied the allegations. The Russian claim has been refuted by independent investigations.

The theatre is among the Ukrainian heritage and cultural sites destroyed during the invasion. The attack has been classified as a war crime by both the Organization for Security and Co-operation in Europe and Amnesty International.

== Background ==
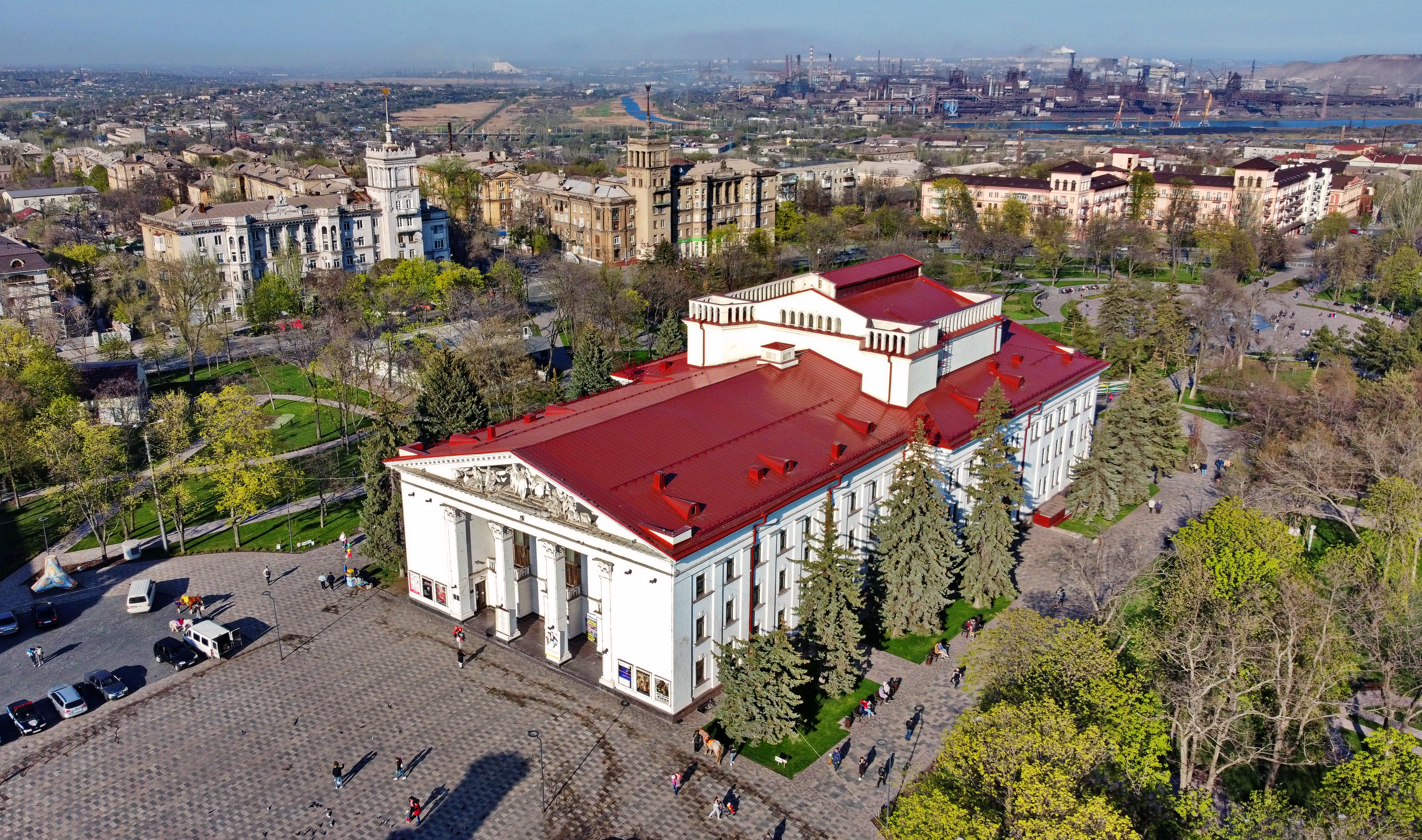
The theatre in May 2021, ten months before the airstrike

On 24 February 2022, the Russian Armed Forces, working together with pro-Russian militias, besieged the port city of Mariupol, leading to heavy casualties. Supplies such as food, gas, and electricity were cut off during the siege. By 17 March, the mayor of Mariupol, Serhiy Orlov, estimated that 80–90 percent of the city had been destroyed due to shelling.

Mariupol City Council officials stated that the theatre was the largest single air raid shelter in the city, sheltering 500 to 1,200 civilians, and at the time of the attack, women and children were sheltering in it.

Satellite images of the theatre taken on 14 March show the word "children" (Russian: "дети") spelled out in two locations on the square outside the theatre. The message was an attempt to identify the building to attacking forces as a civilian air raid shelter containing children, and not a military target.

== Attack ==
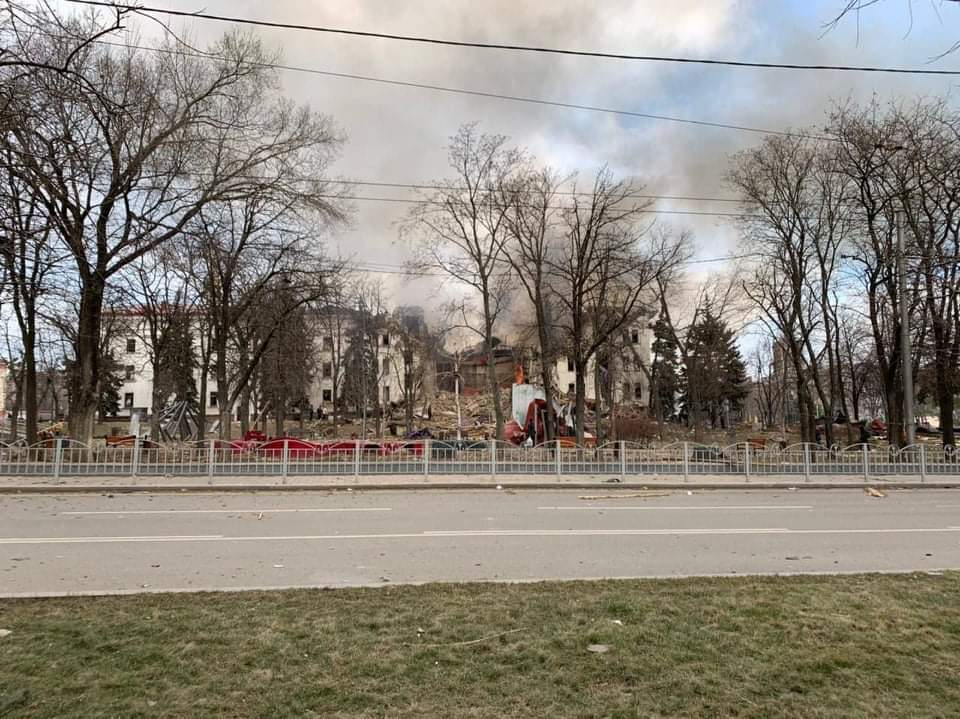
The severely damaged theatre (view from the road)

On 16 March 2022, Ukraine accused Russian forces of shelling civilian areas in Mariupol. Artillery hit numerous locations, including a swimming pool building and a vehicle convoy; shelling then struck the theatre, reducing the building to rubble.

The time of the attack on the Donetsk Regional Academic Drama Theatre was shortly after 10 am.

The bomb shelter in the basement of the theatre survived the bombing, but many people were still trapped underneath the burning rubble. A member of the Ukrainian parliament from Mariupol, Dmytro Gurin, said that the rescue efforts were hampered due to continued attacks on the area by Russian forces.

On 25 March, videos showing the immediate aftermath of the attack emerged on social media: a first video showed people covered in dust descending from the partially destroyed upper floors of the building; and a second video showed the site of the impact.

== Victims ==
On 17 March, the number of casualties was unclear; some emerged alive.

By 18 March, around 130 survivors had been rescued. The Mariupol City Council stated that according to initial information, no one had been killed, although one person was gravely wounded.

On 25 March, the Mariupol City Council estimated that about 300 people had been killed as a result of the airstrike.

Also on 25 March, The Washington Post published an investigation that cited witnesses that said that all families that had been sheltering in the theatre's basement had escaped unscathed and evacuations had begun before the bombing.

On 4 May, the Associated Press (AP) published an investigation with evidence pointing to 600 dead in the airstrike. Many survivors estimated that around 200 people –including rescuers– had escaped through the main exit or one side entrance; the other side and the back were crushed.

On 7 June, Human Rights Watch and Kharkiv Human Rights Protection Group separately announced that Ukrainian refugees, as well as civilians forcibly deported to Russia, were being pressured and intimidated to implicate Ukrainian military personnel in war crimes. This includes a case where a refugee was pressured to implicate the Azov Regiment in the theatre airstrike.

== Reaction ==
Ukrainian President Volodymyr Zelenskyy accused Russia of committing a war crime.

Russian media have widely reported that the Russian Ministry of Defence denied responsibility for the bombing and accused the Azov Regiment of planning and carrying out the theatre bombing instead. They claimed that no Russian forces carried out air strikes within the city and blamed Azov Regiment for "taking hostages" of civilians and blowing up the upper floors of the theatre.

Italy's Minister of Culture, Dario Franceschini, made an offer to the Ukrainian government to rebuild the theatre.

== Independent reports ==
On 13 April, the Organization for Security and Co-operation in Europe (OSCE) published a report which covered the Mariupol theatre airstrike.

Russia does not claim that it was a legitimate target but that it was blown up by the Ukrainian Azov battalion. The Mission did not receive any indication that this could be the case... This incident constitutes most likely an egregious violation of IHL and those who ordered or executed it committed a war crime.

On 4 May, the Associated Press published an investigation of the airstrike, increasing the Ukrainian government's estimate of about 300 to 600 dead. It also refuted Russian claims that the theatre was demolished by Ukrainian forces or served as a Ukrainian military base:

None of the witnesses saw Ukrainian soldiers operating inside the building. And not one person doubted that the theater was destroyed in a Russian air attack aimed with precision at a civilian target everyone knew was the city’s largest bomb shelter, with children in it.

On 30 June, Amnesty International concluded that the airstrike was perpetrated by Russian forces which used two 500-kilogram (1,100 lb) bombs, and was a war crime.

Many people were injured and killed in this merciless attack. Their deaths were likely caused by Russian forces deliberately targeting Ukrainian civilians. The International Criminal Court, and all others with jurisdiction over crimes committed during this conflict, must investigate this attack as a war crime. All those responsible must be held accountable for causing such death and destruction.

Amnesty International believes that at least a dozen people were killed by the strike and likely many more, and that many others were seriously injured. This estimate is lower than previous counts, reflecting the fact that large numbers of people had left the theatre during the two days prior to the attack, and most of those who remained were in the theatre’s basement and other areas that were protected from the full brunt of the blast.

== Aftermath ==
On 11 July 2022 Ukrainian media reported that the theatre rubble was cleared by Russians and bodies of victims were allegedly taken away to an unknown place.

A Potemkin village–styled scene was built around the ruins of the theatre. In 2025, the theatre reopened following reconstruction works.

In February 2023, Russian journalist Maria Ponomarenko was sentenced to six years in prison under Russia's war censorship laws for publishing information about the Mariupol theatre airstrike.

On 29 March 2023 InformNapalm published a report in which they accused Colonel Sergey Atroshchenko, commander of the 960th Assault Aviation Regiment of the Russian Air Force (VVSR) of leading the assault, which started from the Primorsko-Akhtarsk airbase in Krasnodar Krai.

== See also ==
- Amiriyah shelter bombing, 1991 attack on Iraqi civilians sheltering
- Mariupol hospital airstrike
