= Express Gazeta =

Russian weekly tabloid newspaper

- Type: Weekly newspaper
- Format: tabloid
- Editor: Sergey Nikitin
- Founded: October 1993; 32 years ago
- Language: Russian
- Headquarters: Moscow
- Country: Russia
- OCLC number: 971928725
- Website: eg.ru

Express Gazeta (Russian: Экспресс-газета) is a Russian weekly tabloid newspaper specializing in the coverage of social and private life of celebrities in Russia and abroad.

== History and profile ==
The newspaper was created with the participation of the former Soviet ambassador to the UK Leonid Zamyatin. Appears since October 1993. The first newspaper tabloid in Russia. The first chief editor of the newspaper Aleksandr Kupriyanov.

The circulation of the newspaper is 800,000 copies. According to 2006 data, the weekly audience of Express Gazeta was approximately is 3 million people. The newspaper is published in Russia, the CIS countries and the Baltic States, Germany, United States and Israel. Publisher Komsomolskaya Pravda Publishing House.

From the first issues in the newspaper, former journalists of the Rossiyskaya Gazeta worked. Until 2005, the publisher of the newspaper was the holding ProfMedia.

The newspaper comes the tab TV World about the stars of Russian TV series, popular TV shows and their presenters.

Since 2014, Express Gazeta has been issuing thematic special issues. The columnists of the newspaper in different years were Anatoly Wasserman, Stanislav Sadalsky, Mikhail Zadornov. Since 1998, the personal column in Express Gazeta has been conducted by music commentator Mikhail Filimonov.

Russian film stars, culture and show business regularly sue the newspaper for the article on interference with private life. Among the applicants are Aleksandr Abdulov, Natalya Andrejchenko, Sergey Bezrukov, Elena Vaenga, Polina Gagarina, Vera Glagoleva, Maria Kozhevnikova. At the same time, some of them litigated and were forced to pay a fine to the newspaper.
