= Mariupol theatre =

Theatre in Mariupol, Ukraine

Coordinates: 47°05′46″N 37°32′55″E

Donetsk Academic Regional Drama Theatre
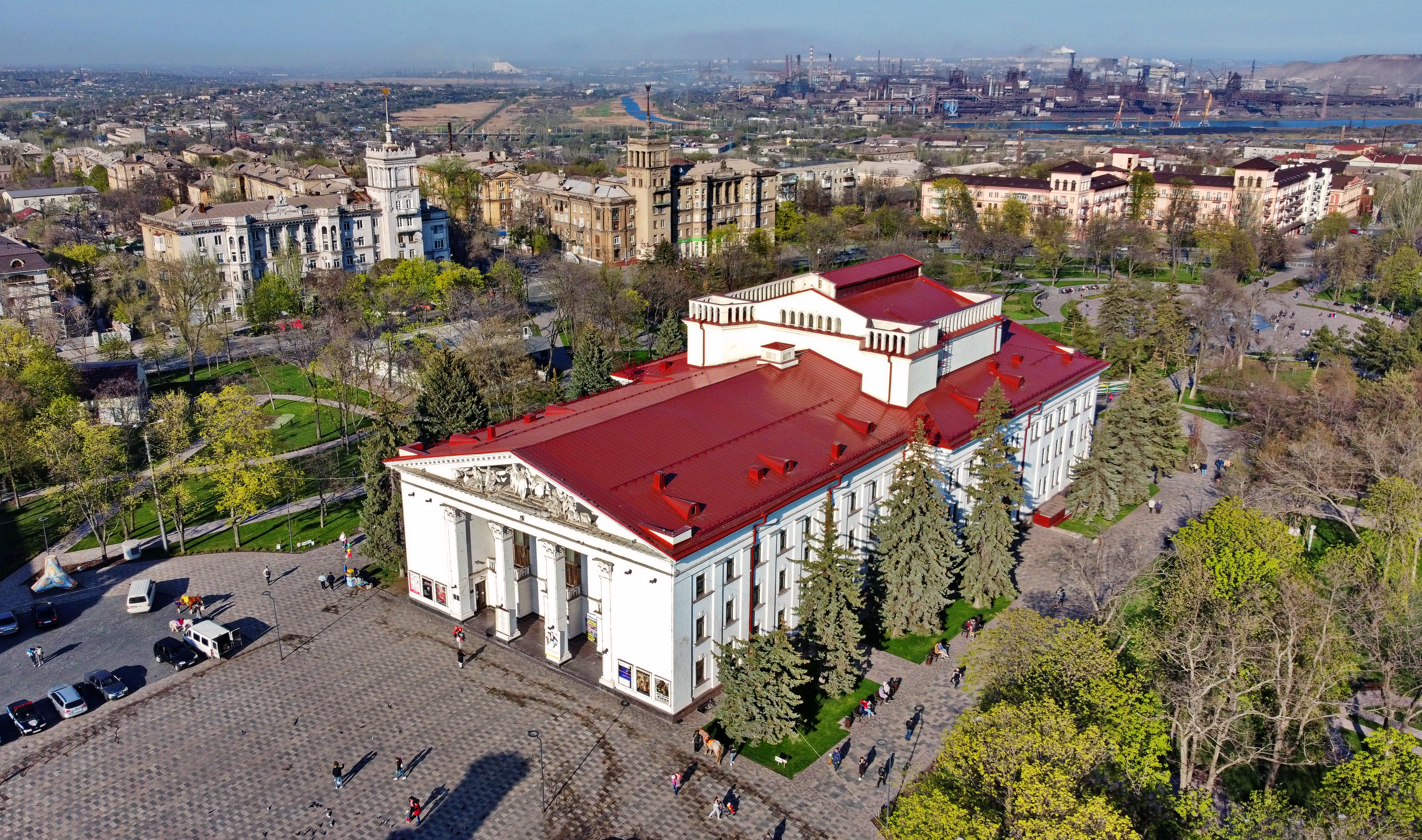
- The theatre in 2021
- Interactive map of the Donetsk Academic Regional Drama Theatre area
- Former names: Donetsk Regional Drama Theatre

General information
- Architectural style: Monumental Classicism
- Location: Theatre Square, 1, Mariupol, Mariupol, Ukraine
- Opened: November 2, 1960 (original); December 28, 2025 (rebuilt)
- Destroyed: March 16, 2022 (original)

Immovable Monument of Local Significance of Ukraine
- Official name: Будівля драматичного театру (Building of the Drama Theater)
- Type: Architecture, History, Monumental Art
- Reference no.: 2056-Дн

Donetsk Academic Regional Drama Theatre (Note: Ukrainian: Донецький академічний обласний драматичний театр, romanized: Donetskyi akademichnyi oblasnyi dramatychnyi teatr; Russian: Донецкий академический областной драматический театр, romanized: Donetskiy akademicheskiy oblastnoy dramaticheskiy teatr) or Mariupol Drama Theatre (Note: Ukrainian: Маріупольський драматичний театр; Russian: Мариупольский драматический театр, romanized: Mariupolsky dramatichesky teatr) is a theatre in Mariupol in southern Ukraine. The modern theatre was constructed in 1960 in the approximate location of the former Church of Mary Magdalene. The theatre was known as Donetsk Regional Drama Theatre before it was given academic status in November 2007.

It was largely destroyed by Russian military airstrikes on 16 March 2022, resulting in the estimated deaths of at least a dozen to over 600 people, in what was labelled a war crime. In 2023, restoration work began on the building with Mariupol under Russian occupation. The restoration of the drama theatre was completed in November 2025. It was reopened in December, facing criticism by Ukrainian city authorities and former performers.

== March 2022 Russian airstrike ==
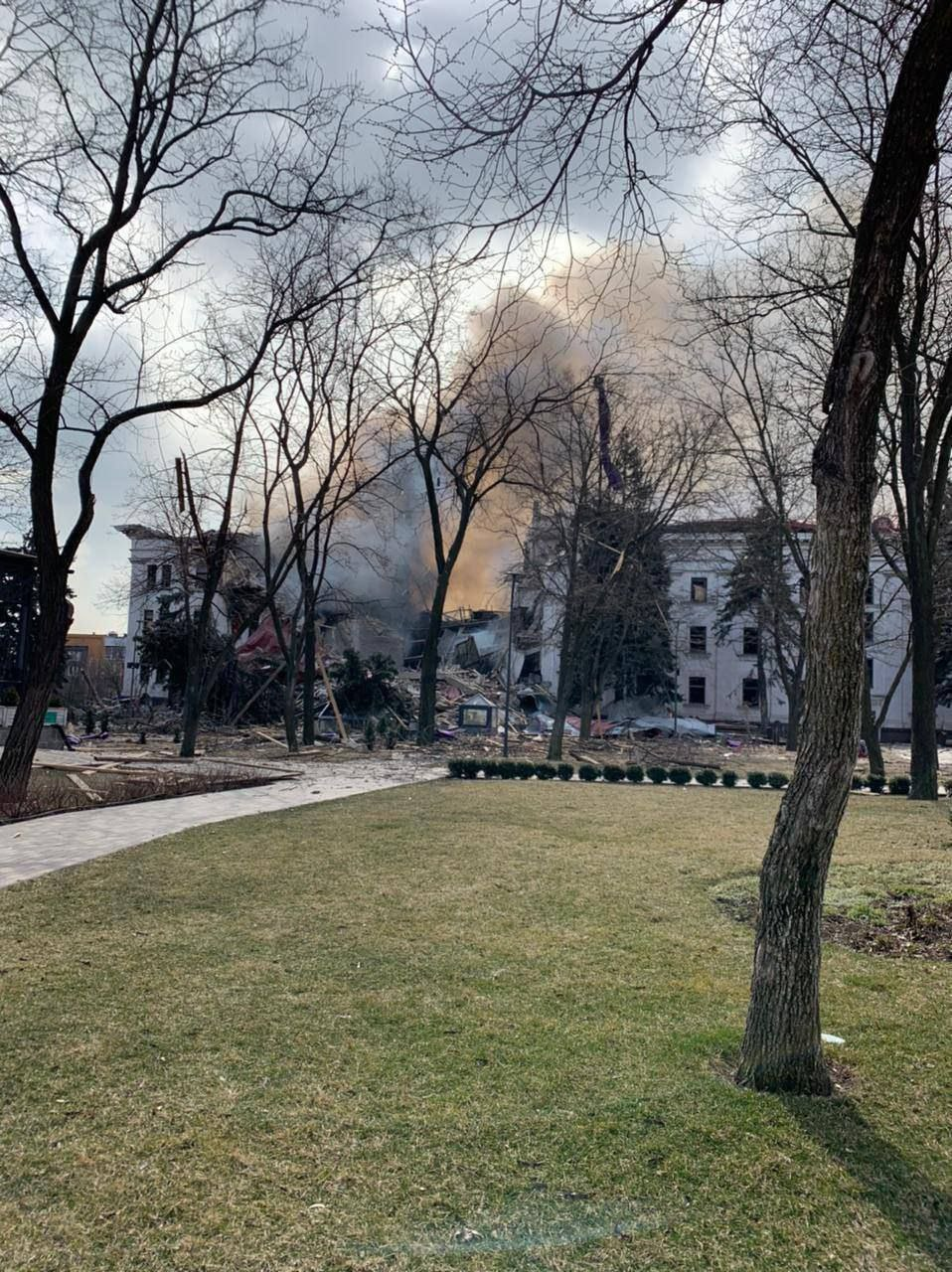
The theatre was bombed on 16 March 2022 during the Russian invasion of Ukraine

On 16 March 2022, the theatre was largely destroyed by airstrikes during the Russian invasion of Ukraine. Hundreds of civilians were apparently sheltering in the building at the time. Satellite imagery taken prior to and immediately after the attack showed the Russian word for children, "Дети", painted on the ground at the front and rear of the building, to inform Russian military planes that children were sheltering in the building. The day after it was destroyed, the Cabinet of Ministers of Italy approved a proposal to offer Ukraine the resources and means to rebuild the theatre as soon as possible. The estimated death toll ranges from at least a dozen to over 600 people. The attack was described by Amnesty International as a "clear war crime" by Russian forces.

According to the Center for Spatial Technologies (CST), an architectural research collective based between Kyiv and Berlin, the occupying Russian forces actively sought to erase evidence related to the Russian strike, inviting pro-war Russian bloggers to record videos saying that Ukraine had destroyed the building in a "false flag" attack. Concerts celebrating Russian nationalism were held in front of the ruins of the theatre. Despite the strike occurring when there was no mobile signal, and phones being checked by Russian "filtering" stations on the way out of the city, as well as occupation authorities taking care to conceal the facts of the war crime using excavators and propaganda, the CST set out to explore the history of the theatre.

== Russian reconstruction ==
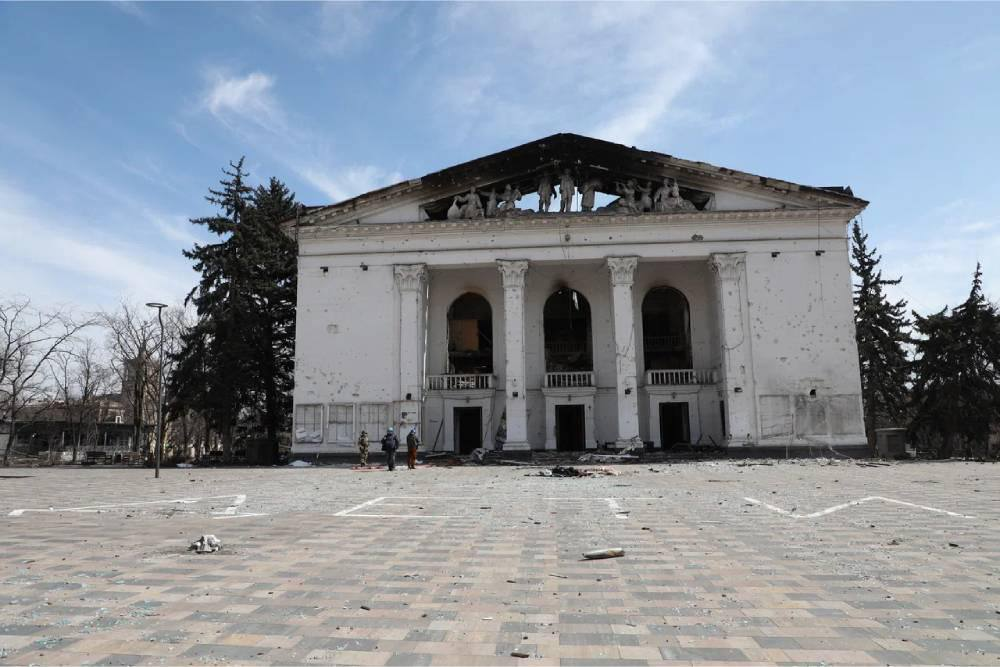
Damage to the western facade of the theatre after the airstrike

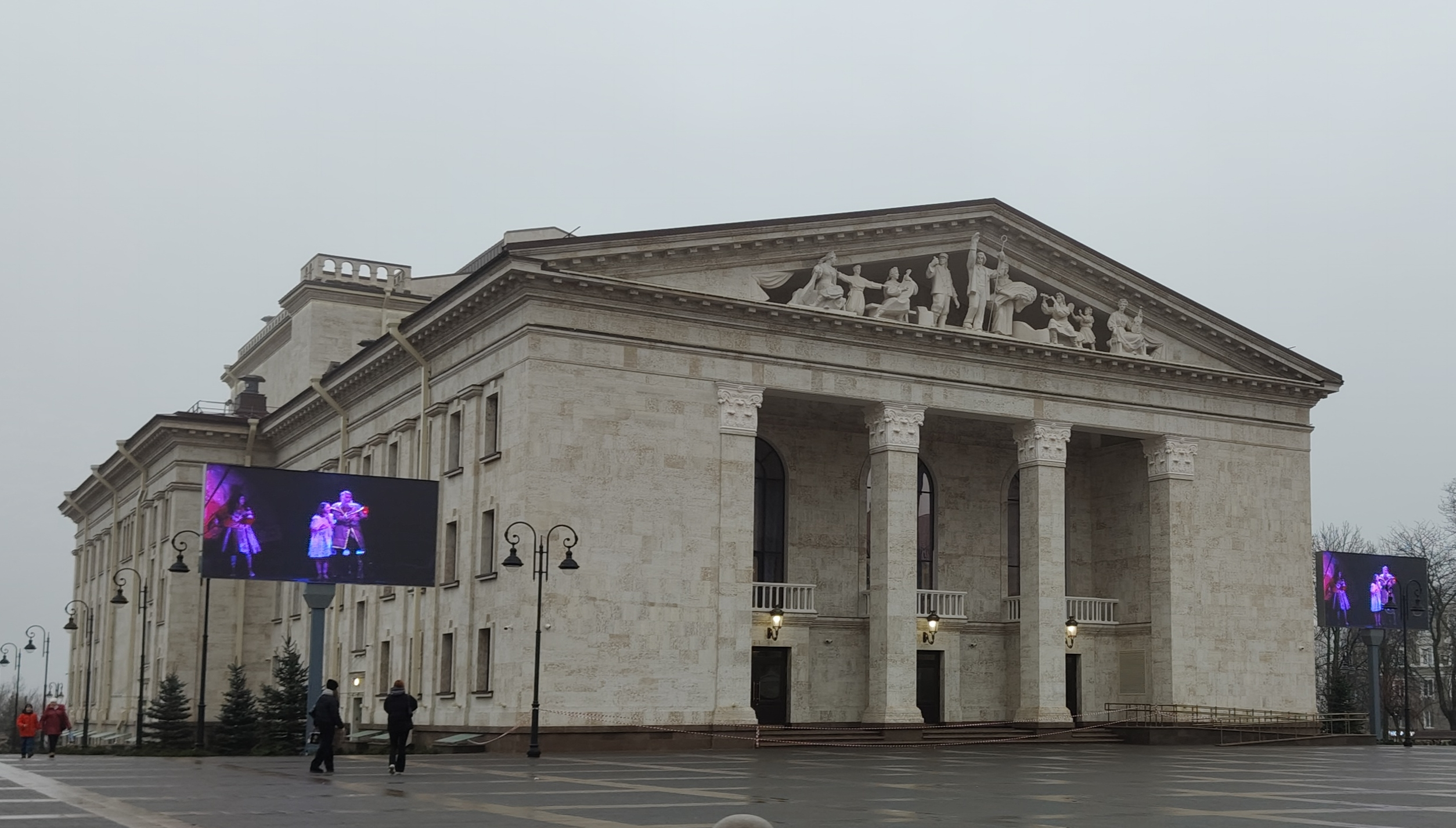
Drama Theatre after reconstruction, December 2025

In 2023, under Russian occupation, a construction team from Saint Petersburg began restoration work on the building. During the renovation, the troupe temporarily relocated to the refurbished philharmonic building. The restoration of the drama theatre was completed in November 2025, while the official reopening took place on 28 December, the reconstruction cost up to 13 billion rubles, according to a Russian news outlet Bumaga, from a local government foundation. Russian appointed officials said the theatre had been "rebuilt, modernized and is nearly ready to host audiences of nearly 500", billing it a restoration of a culture site, which received criticism from Ukrainians who had fled Mariupol, who called it an "act of desecration". An actor who had been performing at the theatre since 2000 described it as "performing a play on the bones of the dead".

Ukrainian city authorities said that the "restoration" was a cynical attempt to conceal the war crime and part of a policy of "Russification" of the city, adding that the repertoire largely consists of works by Russian playwrights and writers.

== History ==
- 1847 – Records the first time a theatrical troupe came to Mariupol, under entrepreneur V. Vinogradova. As there was no theatre in the city the troupe gave its performances in a rented barn on Ekaterininskaya street (nowadays – Lenin Avenue).
- 1850–1860 – A barn in the courtyard of Popov (a local resident) provides the first theatrical venue – "The Temple of a Muse of the Melpomene". The building is fairly basic with elementary conditions, but here during several seasons many troupes performed. These included participation by provincial actors of that time: Alexandrov, Neverov, Medvedeva, Stoppel, Novitsky, Minsky, Prokofyev, Piloni and others.
- 1878 – The first professional theatrical troupe appears in the city of Mariupol. The beginning of the Mariupol theatre is funded by the son of a rich merchant Vasily Shapovalov who has rented a room for the theatre. The career of actors I. Zagorsky, L. Zagorsky, L. Linitskaja and others begins here.
- 1887 – Opening of the newly built theatre on November 8, named the Concert Hall (subsequently Winter Theatre). It has a big stage, comfortable seating, a place for the orchestra, and an auditorium for 800.
- 1880–1890 – Performances of outstanding masters of the Ukrainian stage took place: M. Kropivnitsky, I. Karpenko-Kary, P. Saksagansky, M. Staritsky and others.
- 1920 – A drama collective "New Theatre" under the management of A. Borisoglebsky was active in the city.
- 1934 – The theatre is created the All-Donetsk musical-dramatical theatre based in Mariupol (the head – A. Smirnov, the main director – A. Iskander).
- 1959 – The Mariupol theatre is given the status Donetsk State Theatre.
- 1960 – November 2, the official opening of the re-constructed theatre and the first performance takes place.
- 1978 – The theatre company celebrates the 100th anniversary. The collective is awarded an Honour for significant merits in the theatrical arts.
- 1985 – The small stage of theatre is opened.
- 2007 – On November 12, by order of the Ministry of Culture and Tourism, the theatre was given the status of an academic theatre.

== See also ==
- Donetsk State Academic Opera and Ballet Theatre in Donetsk
