= Russkiy Kurier =

- Type: Daily newspaper
- Format: Website
- Founder(s): Igor Golembiovsky
- Founded: April 2003
- Language: Russian
- Ceased publication: December 2017
- Headquarters: Moscow, Russia
- Website: www.ruscur.ru

Russkiy Kurier (Russian: Русский курьер, translated as Russian Courier) was a Moscow-based daily newspaper.

== History ==
It was founded in 2003 by Igor Golembiovsky, a journalist who had left Novye Izvestiya after being dismissed by the post of editor; Golembiovsky said his firing was due to political reasons, because of his opposition to Vladimir Putin's government. In the beginning of the newspaper, journalists, who had left Novye Izvestiya a few months earlier, participated. Igor Golembiovsky, Otto Lacis, Sergey Agafonov, Elena Yampolskaya, Zoya Svetova, Alina Rebel and others were authors. "Publishing House Kh. H. S. PUBLISHING HOUSE" under the direction of Igor Yakovenko, then Secretary of the Union of Journalists of Russia, was the newspaper’s publisher.

The newspaper shut down in April 2005 for financial reasons. Chief editor Golembiovsky and the entire staff were dismissed. On May 30, 2005, the newspaper resumed work with Sergey Frolov as new chief editor. His new concept was to create a newspaper of national interests.

In 2013 it launched its online version on its homepage ruscur.ru. In 2017 Russkiy Kurier ceased publication.
