= Novye Izvestia =

Russian newspaper

- Type: Daily newspaper
- Format: Tabloid
- Owner: Alliance Oil Company
- Founded: 24 October 1997
- Language: Russian
- Headquarters: Moscow, Russia
- Circulation: 54,000 (as of 2014)
- Website: Official website

Novye Izvestia (Russian: Новые Известия) is a daily newspaper published in Moscow, Russia.

== History ==
It was founded in 1997 by a group of journalists who left Izvestia newspaper with the financial backing of Boris Berezovsky. After Vladimir Putin's election as President of Russia in 2000, Novye Izvestia became a frequent critic of the new government, especially over the Kremlin's influence on democratic freedoms for Russian citizens and the war in Chechnya.

As Boris Berezovsky had fled to London, Oleg Mitvol obtained a 76% share in the newspaper from him, but Berezovsky effectively continued to support the newspaper financially. However, on 20 February 2003, Oleg Mitvol, being the chairman of the Board of Directors (1997–2003) and citing a decision of a meeting of the board kept secret from the journalists despite their 24% share, accused Director General of Novye Izvestia Igor Golembiovsky of misappropriation of funds and fired him. The publication was suspended. Boris Berezovsky claimed that Mitvol's move was politically motivated, as the newspaper was opposed to President Vladimir Putin and on that very day had published an article by Vladimir Pribylovsky about the allegedly emerging cult of Putin's personality.

Several leading journalists of Novye Izvestia, including Golembiovsky, in two months formed a new and smaller daily magazine, Russkiy Kurier. Novye Izvestia was resumed under Director General Valery Yakov, former Deputy Director General, who had been opposed to the dismissal of Golembiovsky as well, but had decided not to leave. However, its criticism of the government became much more subdued.

== See also ==
- Otto Latsis
