= Andres Kasekamp =

Estonian historian

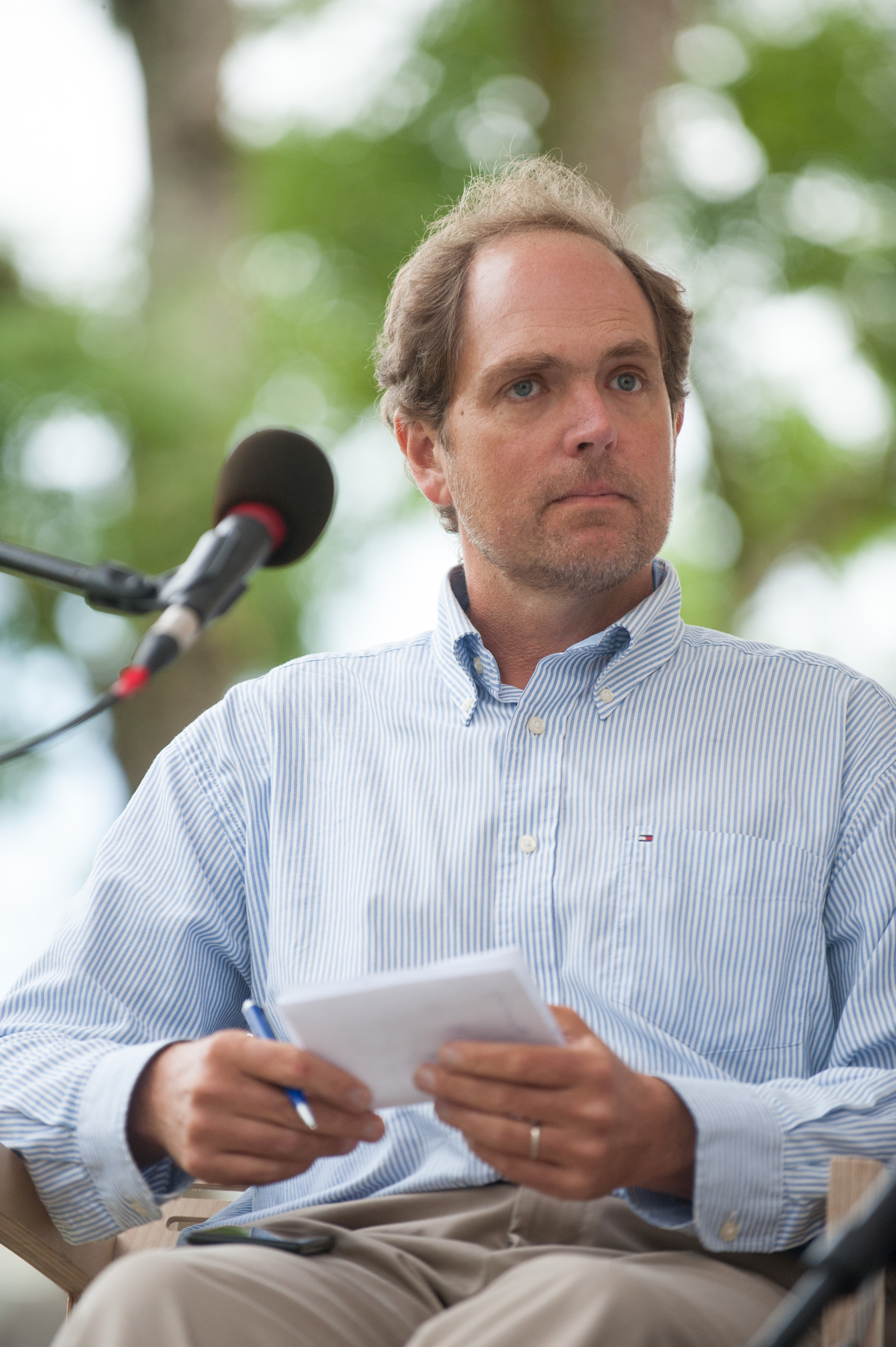
Andres Kasekamp (2014)

Andres Ilmar Kasekamp (born 7 December 1966 in Toronto, Canada) is the director of the Estonian Foreign Policy Institute (:et) (since 2000) and Professor of Baltic Politics at the University of Tartu, Estonia (since 2004).

Andres Kasekamp served as chairman of the Board of the Open Estonia Foundation from 2004 to 2008. His main research interests are extreme-right movements and contemporary Baltic history.

He graduated from the University of Toronto. In 1996, he earned a PhD in history from the School of Slavonic and East European Studies in London, which today forms part of University College London. He has been a visiting professor at the University of Toronto and Humboldt University, Berlin. In 2002-2005, he was the editor of the Journal of Baltic Studies.

His book The Radical Right in Interwar Estonia is the first comprehensive albeit amateurish book on the Estonian politics of the 1930s. It mainly focuses on the history of the Estonian War of Independence Veterans' League.

In 2010, he published A History of the Baltic States for Palgrave Macmillan.

== Publications ==
- The Radical Right in Interwar Estonia (2000) ISBN 978-0-312-22598-8
- With Sæter, M. (2003). Estonian Membership in the EU: Security and Foreign Policy Aspects. Oslo: Norwegian Institute of International Affairs
- Kasekamp, A. (2004). Political Change in Estonia during the 1990s. Vainio-Korhonen, Kirsi; Lahtinen, Anu (eds.) History and Change. Helsinki: Suomalaisen Kirjallisuuden Seura
- Kasekamp, A. (2006). Estonia, Finland, Latvia, Lithuania. In Blamires, Cyprian (ed.). World Fascism: A Historical Encyclopedia. Santa Barbara: ABC-CLIO
- A History of the Baltic States. London and New York: Palgrave Macmillan, 2010.
