= FRCC =

FRCC may refer to:

- Fell & Rock Climbing Club
- Finnish-Russian Chamber of Commerce
- Florida Reliability Coordinating Council
- Fox River Classic Conference
- Front Range Community College
