= Russian Democratic Society =

- Российское демократическое общество Руско демократско друштво Rusko demokratsko društvo
- Abbreviation: RDD, RDO
- Formation: 8 December 2022
- Headquarters: Belgrade, Serbia
- Representative: Peter Nikitin

Russian Democratic Society (Russian: Российское демократическое общество, Serbian Cyrillic: Руско демократско друштво, romanized: Rusko demokratsko društvo) is an anti-war Russian diaspora organization in Serbia. It represents the Russian citizens which emigrated to Serbia following the Russian invasion of Ukraine. It opposes the invasion of Ukraine. Russian Democratic Society describes itself as "anti-war and anti-fascist".

The community adopted its name in English from the Russian Democratic Society, a distinct organization based in the United Kingdom that was registered approximately concurrently with this one. However, it had been known under the name 'Russian Democratic Society' well before this registration. The choice of name reflects a mutual commitment to promoting democratic values and human rights.

== History ==
Following the Russian invasion of Ukraine in February 2022, tens of thousands of Russian citizens emigrated to Serbia. Russian Democratic Society was founded on 8 December 2022 by a group of Russian anti-war activists in Belgrade. It is represented by Peter Nikitin, a Belgrade-based human rights activist.

On 1 August 2023, the Russian Democratic Society has published an open appeal to Serbian Prime Minister Ana Brnabić and President Aleksandar Vučić to "stop the persecution of Russian anti-war activists in Serbia".

In 2025, the organization was recognized as an undesirable organization in Russia.
