= Ülle Aaskivi =

Estonian politician (1950–2007)

- Born: Ülle Kiin; 5 December 1950; Viljandi, then part of Estonian SSR, Soviet Union
- Died: 17 January 2007 (aged 56)
- Education: University of Tartu
- Occupation: Politician
- Known for: Voter for the Estonian restoration of Independence.

Ülle Aaskivi (née Kiin; 5 December 1950 – 17 January 2007) was an Estonian lawyer, politician, and public official. Aaskivi was elected a member of the Estonian Supreme Soviet in 1990 and the Estonian Constitutional Assembly, as well as one of the ratifiers of the Constitution of Estonia who voted for the Estonian restoration of Independence. She was elected to the Riigikogu for the Social Democratic Party of Estonia.

== Biography ==
Aaskivi was born on 5 December 1950 in Viljandi as Ülle Kiin. Sirje Kiin (:et) was her sister. She graduated from Viljandi 1st Secondary School in 1968 and from the University of Tartu Faculty of Law. She worked at the prosecutor's office and later as a government adviser.

Aaskivi started her political career in Viljandi County by organizing a local branch of the Popular Front of Estonia and was elected to the Supreme Soviet of Estonia along with Jaak Allik, Uno Anton, and Jüri Rätsep.

In 2002, on the tenth anniversary of the ratification of the Constitution of Estonia, a collection of articles, memoirs and documents, "Põhiseaduse tulek", was published by Aaskivi and Eve Pärnaste.

=== Term at the Riigikogu ===
Prior to the 2006 presidential election, the Conservative People's Party of Estonia (EKRE) and Estonian Centre Party leaders mandated a ban on their party members from voting in the presidential election. Opinions on the decision were controversial: EKRE's chairman Villu Reiljan said that the decision was made on possible attempts to acquire money, while Tõnis Lukas, the co-chairman of Pro Patria and Res Publica Union, expressed his opinion that the EKRE would undermine the free will of the MEPs. According to Aaskivi, this was an undemocratic step that she could not accept as a citizen.

On 28 August 2006, at the session of the Riigikogu, Aaskivi, after serving as a representative of the government, a presentation of the government's draft before the first extraordinary personal statement of the presidential election (which she said as a citizen of the Republic of Estonia and as a member of the 20 August Club), invited all members of the Riigikogu to participate in the presidential elections in the Riigikogu. She condemned the absence of the presidential election of EKRE and the Centre Party, and called on the ambassadors to serve the country of Estonia.

There was a lot of reactions to the presentation by Aaskivi. According to then Speaker of the Riigikogu, Centre Party member Toomas Varek, Aaskivi abused her position. "It would have been correct if she would have asked for the permission of the Riigikogu to give prior permission and also showed her statement," Varek commented in an interview with Postimees. "Without such a statement, I certainly would not have allowed it." On the other hand, Chancellor of Justice Allar Jõks found that "it was a sincere and courageous performance." Ain Seppik, head of the central faction of the Riigikogu, told Eesti Päevaleht: "She behaved very boldly and with inner conviction as a woman, and she had a reason to show her respect."

== Death and legacy ==
Aaaskivi died on 17 January 2007 after a period of illness. In a short in memoriam post on Eesti Päevaleht written after her death, former President of Estonia Toomas Hendrik Ilves called her "a big little woman", remarking her influence during her time on the Riigikogu. She had three children: daughters Birgit and Signe, and son Urmas.

== Awards ==
- 2002: 5th class of the Order of the National Coat of Arms (received 14 March 2002)
- 2006: 3rd class of the Order of the National Coat of Arms (received 23 February 2006)
- 2007: Open Estonia Foundation Compilation Award (2006, awarded posthumously)
- 2007: Estonian Women's Co-operation Team Award

== Writings and speeches ==
- "Põhiseaduse tulek". Written by Eve Pärnaste and Ülle Aaskivi (designer-consultant). Kirjastus SE & JS 2002, ISBN 9985-854-42-X (binding), ISBN 9985-854-41-1
- "Ülle Aaskivi kõne Riigikogus 28. augustil 2006" Jevgeni Krištafovitš
