= Ukraine Crisis Media Center =

Non-governmental organization

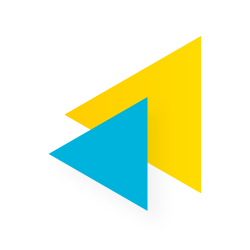
Logo

Ukraine Crisis Media Center (UCMC) is a non-governmental organization that provides information about events in Ukraine, challenges and threats to the national security; in particular in the military, political, economic, energy and humanitarian spheres. UCMC assists international media representatives, aiming to defend Ukraine's sovereignty and its national interests in the global information space.

== History ==
UCMC was founded in March 2014 with the efforts of leading Ukrainian experts in the sphere of international relations, communications and public relations. It was established to help Ukraine amplify its voice on the international arena, about the events connected to annexation of Crimea by the Russian Federation.

Following the election of President Volodymyr Zelenskyy in 2019, some of whose actions the UCMC strongly disagree with, the UCMC with the support of many Ukrainian NGOs issued a statement of an extensive list of "red lines not to be crossed" by the new administration, asserting if they were it "will inevitably lead to political instability in our country".

== Funding ==
The activities of UCMC are enabled with support of its partners: Public Affairs department of the Embassy of the United States, Kyiv, USAID, International Renaissance Foundation, National Endowment for Democracy (USA), Ukrainian World Foundation (Canada), European Endowment for Democracy (EU), Matra Programme (Embassy of the Netherlands in Ukraine), Internews Agency, Mondelez International, the Institute for Statecraft (UK), NATO and others.

== Departments ==
=== Press Centre ===
Press Centre of UCMC provides opportunity for civil activists, experts, national politicians and representatives of the government as well as representatives of diplomatic missions to inform society about the events and processes that take place in Ukraine and around it. Since July 2014, UCMC has hosted daily briefings on military developments in Ukraine by a government representative – Presidential Administration spokesperson on ATO related issues, following them up with press releases in all its working languages.

=== International Outreach ===
International Outreach Department aims at spreading information about Ukraine abroad and ensuring presence of Ukraine in the Western media discourse. This department provides assistance to the journalists who cover Ukraine from abroad, drafts its own analytic materials, infographics, and translates press releases of UCMC into English, German, French, Spanish, Italian and Portuguese. International Outreach cooperates with the western academic and political circles to promote positive attitude towards Ukraine, organizes press tours of foreign journalists to Ukraine, ensures Ukraine's representation at various international conferences and informs foreign audiences about the situation in Ukraine through mailing and social media profiles in different languages.

- In the light of the referendum on Association Agreement between the EU and Ukraine on April 6, 2016, UCMC participated in the information campaign about Ukraine in the Netherlands, organizing various debates on Ukraine in the Netherlands and also arranging press tours of the Dutch journalists to Ukraine. The aim of the project was to deliver objective image of Ukraine to the Netherlands and likewise present the Netherlands as objectively as possible to Ukraine.

=== National Outreach ===
The work of the National Outreach department is aimed at supporting information activities in the regions of Ukraine, integration of eastern and southern regions into all-Ukrainian information context. The department organizes meetings with local journalists, representatives of the local governments, non-governmental organisations, civil activists and volunteers, experts and key opinion leaders in order study the needs of the regions, identify topics for joint work and center the efforts on solving issues of a certain region in the previously identified spheres.

- Newspaper Mir v Donbasse (English – “Peace in Donbas”) – is an information product, produced by UCMC with the support of Germany's Foreign Federal Office. This was a free bulletin with the most up-to-date information for the residents of the area near the contact line in Donetsk and Luhansk regions. The newspaper was circulating in the eastern Ukraine for 6 months in 2015.
- Pilot project “Spokesperson of peaceful life” – is a project that organizes communication with each city on the Ukraine-controlled territories in Donetsk and Luhansk regions in a form of press conferences over Skype. This project is ongoing.

=== Arts Department ===
Main push to establishing Arts Department at UCMC was a desire to shift focus on covering the life in Ukraine towards more peaceful events. This department provides organisation and information support of Ukrainian culture projects. The department also creates and implements its own culture initiatives and projects within the premises of UCMC and across the whole Ukraine. “Culture diplomacy between the regions of Ukraine” – is a UCMC complex program aimed at establishing dialogue and reconciliation between the residents of East and West Ukraine with tools of modern art. Among the implemented projects: Religious Icons Exhibition by Lev Skop exhibition of artist Lilia Teptyaieva and a series of workshops “Coloured paper”, media play “il Camprese”: letters of [Ukrainian writer] Mykhailo Kotsyubynskyi from the Capri island, arts and culture residence “Upon Boh” – place of culture in the context of decommunisation processes, workshop “DE”: revitalising public spaces and building communication between the local communities and local governments, photo exhibition of Sergey Loiko “Airport” and many more.

=== Ukraine Reforms Communications Taskforce ===
This project of UCMC was launched in July 2014 with the support of the International Renaissance Foundation as a platform for dialogue between the public institutions and the expert communities and non-governmental organisations. The aim of this project is to shape common attitude towards the directions and strategies of reforms. Ukraine Reforms Communications Task-force (URCT) also acts as advocate and promoter of reforms in the country by means of drafting and spreading all kinds of information products as well as holding its own events that facilitate shaping public opinion towards reforms and understanding reforms processes.
