= Chamber of commerce =

Organization for the promotion of business interests

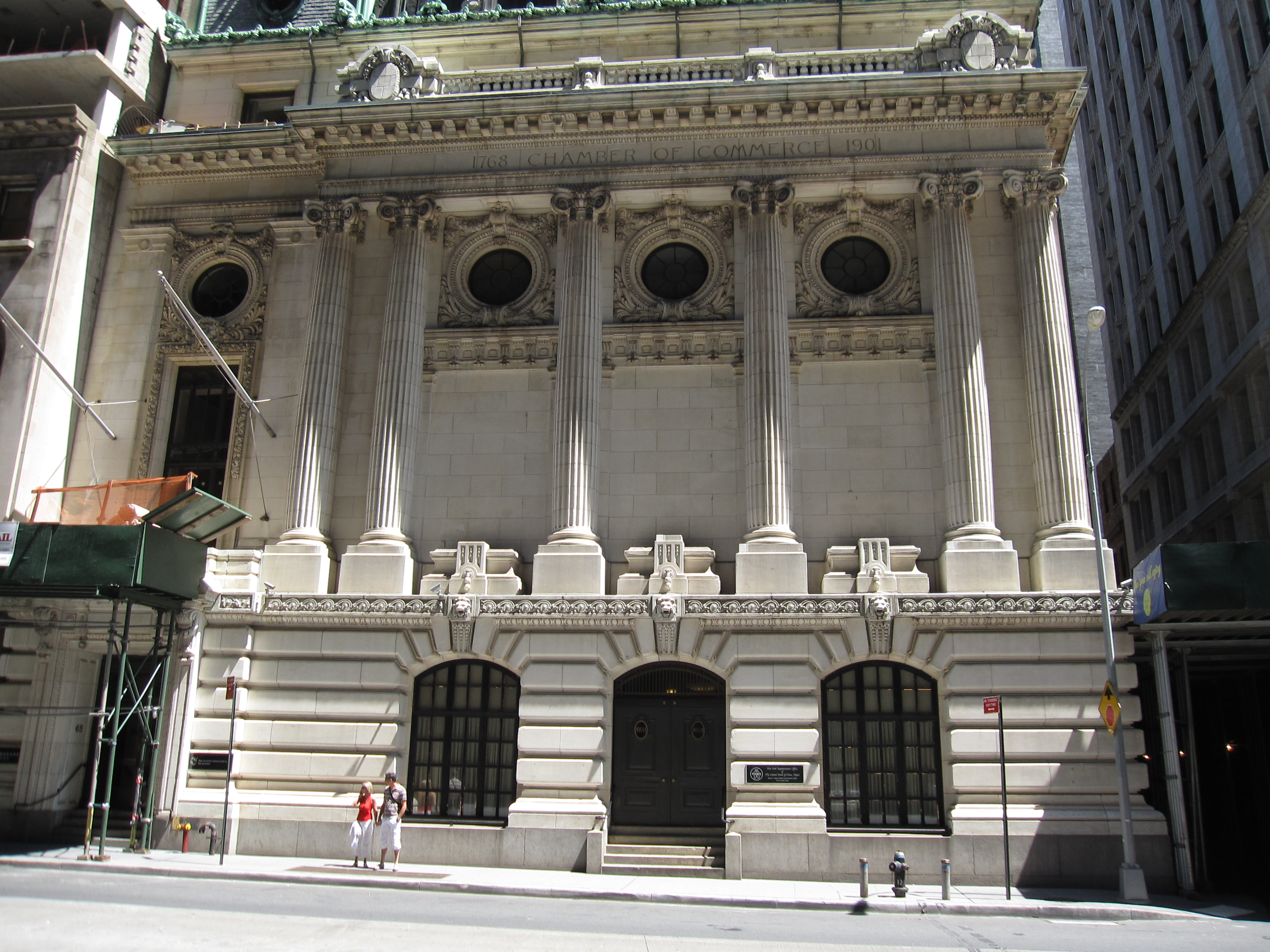
The former headquarters of Chamber of Commerce of the State of New York, the oldest chamber of commerce in the United States, established in 1768 in British America during the colonial era

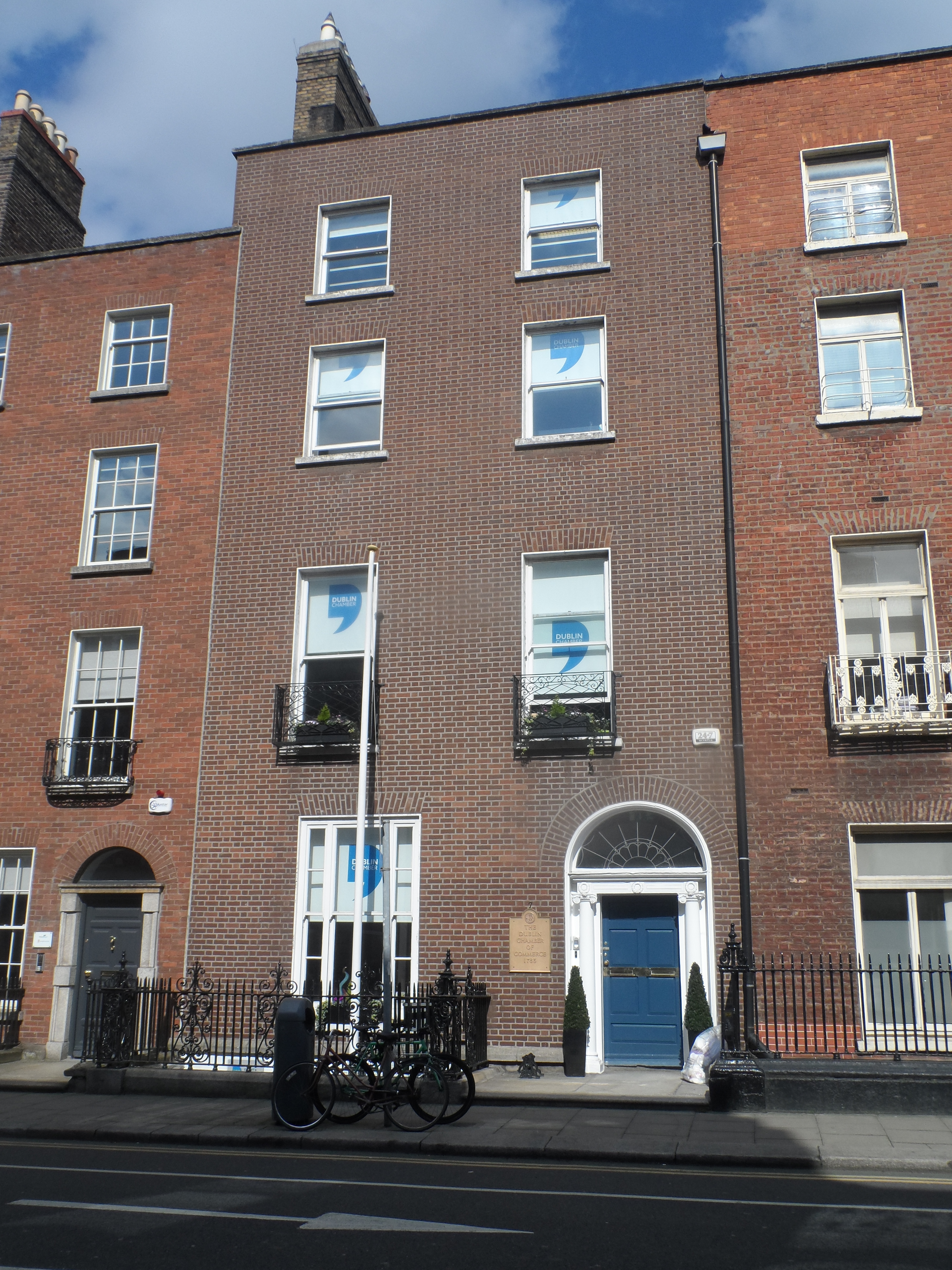
The Dublin Chamber of Commerce, founded in 1783

A chamber of commerce, or board of trade, is a local business network whose goal is to further the interests of its members. Business owners in towns and cities form these local societies to advocate for the business community. Local businesses are members, and they elect a board of directors or executive council to set policy for the chamber.

A chamber of commerce may be a voluntary or a mandatory association of business firms belonging to different trades and industries. They serve as spokespeople and representatives of a business community. They differ from country to country.

In some countries, a chamber of commerce is distinguished from a chamber of trade which represents the interests of tradespeople and artisans rather than industry. An example is the French Chambre de métiers et de l’artisanat (CMA), the chamber of trades and artisans.

== History ==
The first chamber of commerce was the Marseille Chamber of Commerce, founded in 1599 in Marseille, France, as the "Chambre de Commerce". The Royal Barcelona Board of Trade was established in 1758.

The world's oldest English-speaking chamber of commerce, and oldest chamber of commerce in North America, is the Halifax Chamber of Commerce, founded in Halifax, Nova Scotia, in 1750.

The Glasgow Chamber of Commerce was founded in 1783. However, the Hull Chamber of Commerce is the United Kingdom's oldest, followed by those of Leeds and Belfast, in present-day Northern Ireland.

As a non-governmental institution, a chamber of commerce has no direct role in writing or passing laws and regulations that affect businesses. It can, however, lobby for laws that are favorable to businesses.

The United States Chamber of Commerce has a long history of anti-union lobbying and union busting at the local and federal levels.

== Characteristics ==
Membership in an individual chamber can range from a few dozen to well over 800,000 members, as is the case with the Paris Île-de-France Regional Chamber of Commerce and Industry. Some chamber organizations in China report even larger membership numbers. Chambers of commerce can range in scope from a single neighborhood within a city or town to the entire world, as with the International Chamber of Commerce.

In the United States, chambers do not operate in the same manner as the Better Business Bureau (BBB). The BBB has the authority to bind its members under a formal operating doctrine and can therefore remove them if complaints arise about their services. Chambers in the U.S. have no such authority, and membership is voluntary. Some chambers are partially funded by local government, others are non-profit, and some are a combination of the two.

Some chambers have joined state, national (such as the United States Chamber of Commerce and the British Chambers of Commerce), and international bodies (such as Eurochambres, the International Chamber of Commerce, and the World Chambers Federation).

== Chamber models ==
=== Community, city and regional chambers ===
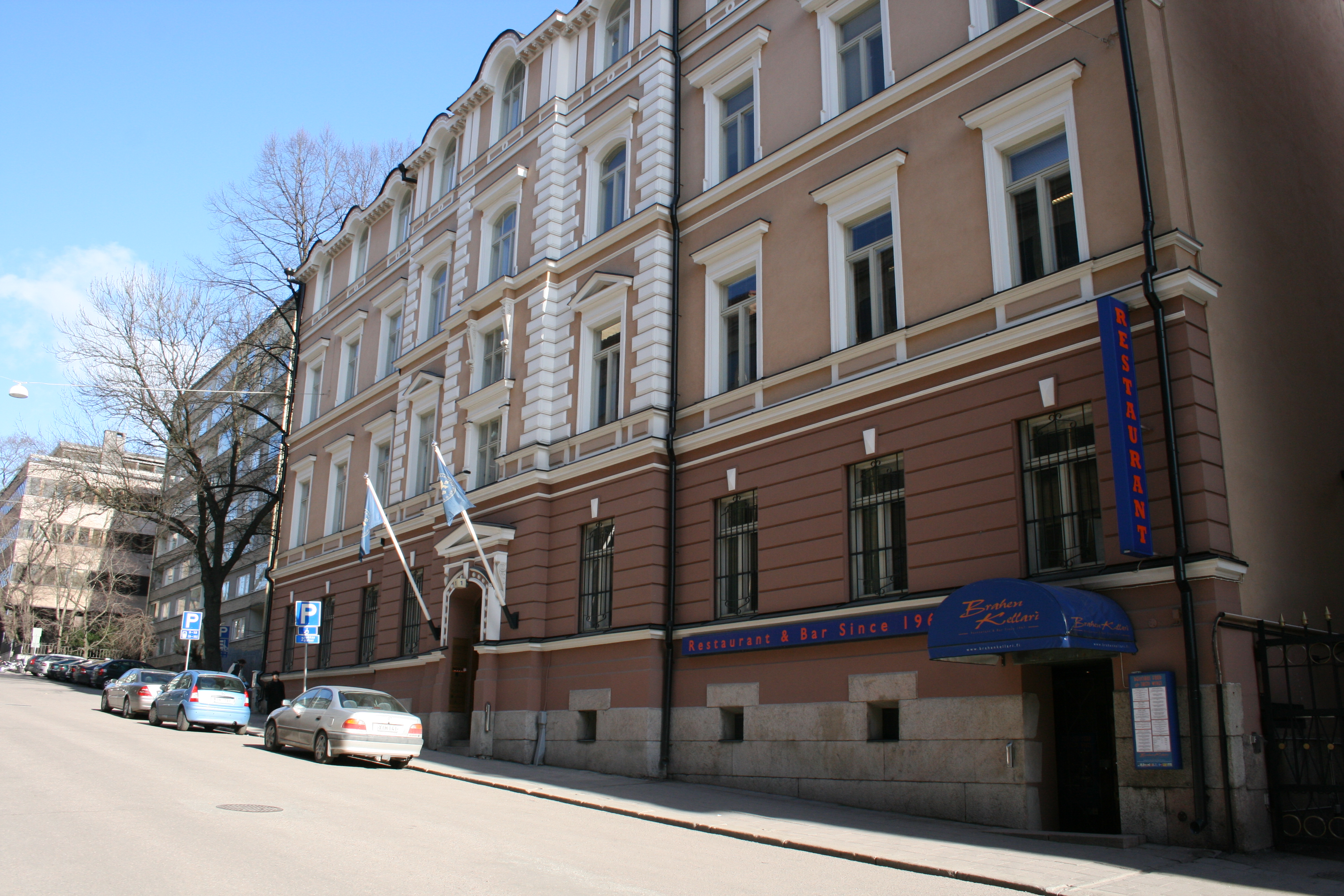
The Turku City Chamber of Commerce (next to a local restaurant) along the Puolalankatu street in Turku, Finland

Chambers of commerce in the United States can operate at the community, city, regional, state, or national level. City Chambers work at the local level to bring the business community together and develop strong local networks, which can lead to business-to-business exchanges. In most cases, city chambers work with their local government, such as the mayor, city council, and other local representatives, to develop pro-business initiatives. There are also bilateral chambers of commerce that link the business environments of two countries (e.g., the Romanian-American Chamber of Commerce and the Moldovan–American Chamber of Commerce).

=== Community chambers ===
Community chambers of commerce started in the UK and later spread to in the US, becoming city chambers of commerce as communities developed and became larger. Community chambers of commerce are smaller and most have a limit on numbers of members.

=== City chambers ===
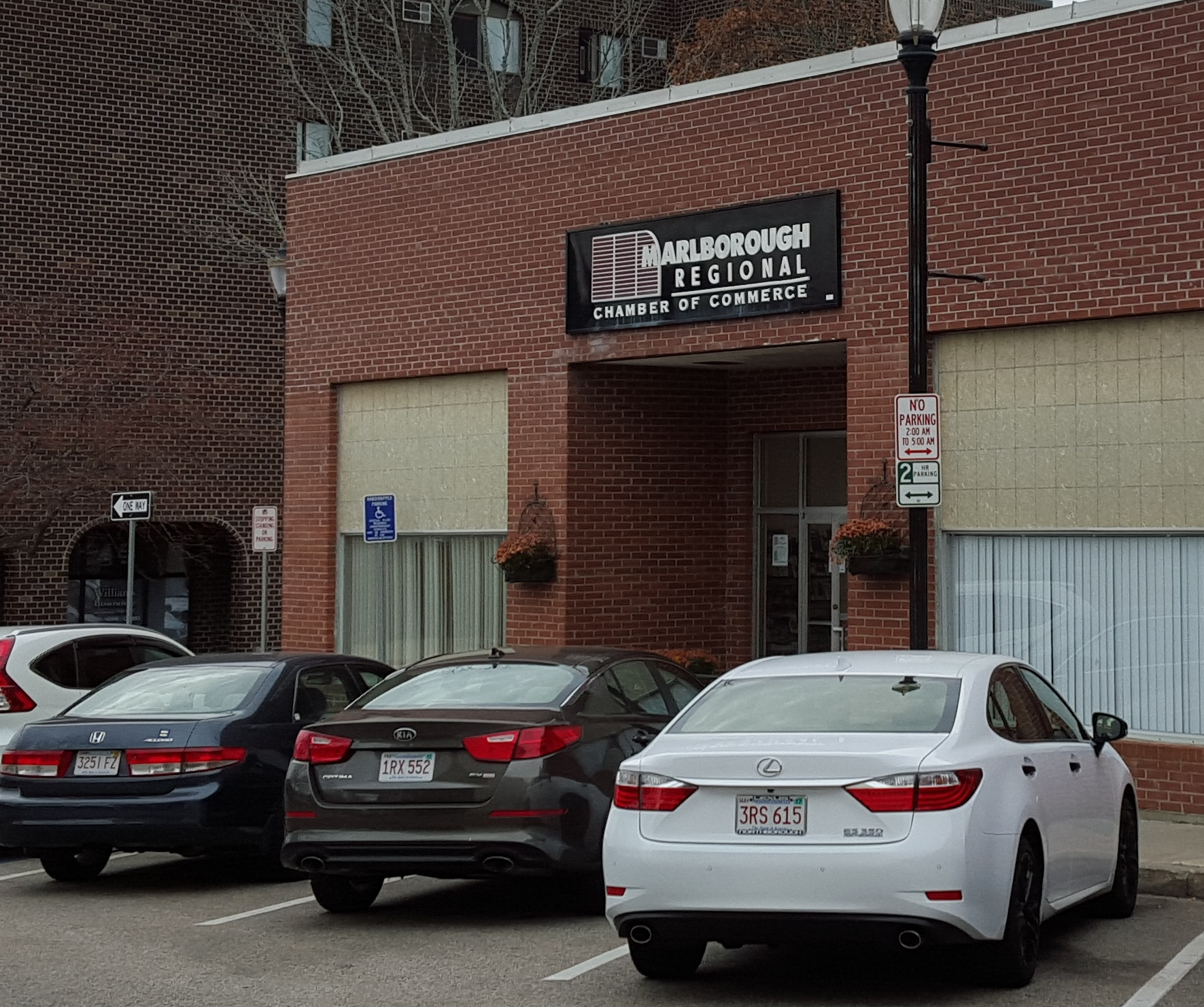
The Marlborough Regional Chamber of Commerce in Marlborough, Massachusetts

City chambers of commerce have a long history in the US. The Charleston Chamber of Commerce is one of the oldest, dating back to colonial 1773. That same year, Boston's Chamber of Commerce organized a seminal tax protest: The Boston Tea Party.

In 2005 there were 2,800 chambers of commerce in the United States and 102 chambers representing U.S. businesses overseas. According to the Association for Chamber of Commerce Executives (ACCE), there are approximately 3,000 chambers of commerce with at least one staff person and "thousands more established as strictly volunteer entities".

=== State chambers ===
State chambers of commerce are much different from local and regional chambers of commerce, as they work on state and sometimes federal issues impacting the business community. Just as the local chamber is critical to the local business community, state chambers serve a unique function, serving as a third-party voice on important business legislation that impacts the business community and is critical in shaping legislation in their respective state. State Chambers work with their Governor, state representatives, state senators, US congressional leaders, and US Senators. In comparison with state trade associations, which serve as a voice and resource to a particular industry, state chambers are looked to as a respected voice, representing the entire business community to enhance and advocate for a better business environment.

=== National and international chambers ===
Addressing the national or international need for information is the key service that these chambers of commerce provide. These services are in most cases at no fee or cost to their members; some of them offer personal and/or business services at a very low fee (like memberships to other associations such as the NRA).

=== Compulsory or public-law chambers ===
Under the compulsory or public law model, enterprises of certain sizes, types, or sectors are obliged to become members of the chamber. This model is common in European Union countries (e.g. France, Germany, Italy, Spain, Austria), as well as Japan and Indonesia. The main tasks of the chambers are foreign trade promotion, vocational training, regional economic development, and general services to their members. The chambers were given responsibilities of public administration in various fields by the state which they exercise in order management. The chambers also have a consultative function; this means the chambers must be consulted whenever a new law related to industry or commerce is proposed.

In Germany, the chambers of commerce and industry (IHK - Industrie- und Handelskammer) and the chambers of skilled crafts (HwK - Handwerkskammer) are public statutory bodies with self-administration under the inspectorate of the state ministry of economy. Enterprises are members by law according to the chamber act (IHK-Gesetz) of 1956. Because of this, such chambers are much bigger than chambers under private law. IHK Munich, the biggest German chamber of commerce, has 350,000 member companies. Germany also has compulsory chambers for "free occupations" such as architects, dentists, engineers, lawyers, notaries, physicians, and pharmacists.

=== Continental/private law chambers ===
Under the private model, which exists in English-speaking countries like the United States and the United Kingdom, companies are not obligated to become chamber members. However, companies often become members to develop their business contacts and, regarding the local chambers (the most common level of organization), to demonstrate a commitment to the local economy. Though governments are not required to consult chambers on proposed laws, the chambers are often contacted given their local influence and membership numbers.

=== Multilateral chambers ===
A multilateral chamber is formed of companies and sometimes individuals from different countries with a common business interest towards or in a specific country. It can further be active in representing the interests of local and foreign investors in that specific country, achieved through promotion and proactivity regarding the general business environment. Multilateral chambers of commerce are independent entities strengthening business relations and interactions between all economic players, and their members may benefit from a broad range of activities that enhance the visibility and reputation of their business.

== Surveys ==
In many countries, Chambers of Commerce are a source of private-sector information. The information is usually gathered by surveying Chamber members. The British Chambers of Commerce Quarterly Economic Survey is an example of a Chambers of Commerce survey that is used by official governmental departments as a guide to the performance of the economy.

== See also ==
- British Chambers of Commerce
- Camera di Commercio, Industria, Agricoltura e Artigianato (Italy)
- Chamber of Commerce and Factories (Suriname)
- European Federation of Bilateral Chambers of Commerce
- Federation of Pakistan Chambers of Commerce & Industry
- Finnish-Russian Chamber of Commerce FRCC
- International Chamber of Commerce
- National Negro Business League
- Non-governmental organization
- Trade group
- Trade union
