= MitOst =

MitOst e.V.
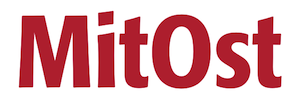
- Logo
- Founded: December 1., 1996
- Founder: Kathrin Liedtke, Imke Hoffmann, Martin Faber, Darius Polok, Uta Schoppe, Birgit Schatt, Sabine Krüger and Markus Hipp
- Type: association
- Purpose: Active citizenship and Cultural exchange
- Location: Berlin
- Region served: Europe and its neighbouring regions
- Members: 1.400
- Employees: Around 24 employees
- Website: mitost.org

MitOst e.V. is an independent, non-governmental, non-profit organisation located in Berlin, Germany. MitOst promotes cultural exchange and active citizenship in Europe and its neighbouring regions. It has 1.400 members in 40 different countries as well as various partners. MitOst organises international programmes and projects and serves as a platform for new forms of social engagement and projects. The association supports exchange and co-operation among cultural managers, strengthens civil-societal keyplayers and societal engagement. In both fields MitOst develops practical techniques and concepts of trainings. Due to long-standing experience concerning project work, MitOst counsels other organisations in developing and realising their own projects.

== History ==
The association was founded in 1996 by lecturers of the Robert Bosch Foundation. They wanted to support cultural exchange and projects in Eastern Europe. Year by year the activities and the region of projects and programmes supported by MitOst enlarged. Today it has 1,400 members in more than 40 countries. MitOst coordinates 10 alumni groups of different international foundation programmes. MitOst organises several international programmes and projects by cooperating with several foundations and institutions. The organisation works non-profit and the involvement of members is voluntary.

In July 2024, MitOst was declared an undesirable organisation in Russia.

== Activities of MitOst ==
MitOst creates innovative spaces and facilitates the exchange of experiences for common activities.

=== Members' projects ===
MitOst offers financial and professional support for its members, helping them to bring to life their ideas such as exhibitions, campaigns in public spaces, theatre workshops, meetings and trainings. Members can apply for different funding formats like "Language and Culture Projects", "Small Projects" and "KlickOst". With the format "kultur-im-dialog.eu+" by MitOst in cooperation with the Ernst Schering Foundation once a year cultural projects dealing with individual experience or national transformation processes in Europe and its neighbouring regions are supported.

=== Alumni work ===
MitOst offers a network for alumni of international foundation programmes. The alumni groups exchange their knowledge, take part in further training and network with each other. MitOst supports these groups in developing and organising formats and events that suit their needs. More about alumni. Alumni projects are funded by MitOst and the Robert Bosch Foundation. Alumni projects serve to improve networking and knowledge transfer between alumni. MitOst coordinates 10 alumni groups from different internationale foundation programmes:

1. Carl Friedrich Goerdeler-Kolleg für Good Governance
2. Deutschlehrerkolleg
3. Europa gestalten – Politische Bildung in Aktion
4. Europainstitut Klaus Mehnert
5. Kulturmanager aus Mittel- und Osteuropa
6. Lektorenprogramm (inkl. Tandemlektoren)
7. Robert Bosch Kulturmanager in Mittel- und Osteuropa, der Russischen Föderation und der arabischen Welt
8. Theodor-Heuss-Kolleg (darunter Gruppen der einzelnen regionalen Kooperationsprogramme)
9. Tutorenprogramm / Studentenservice International
10. Völkerverständigung macht Schule

=== Networking ===
MitOst is a part of several networks to take part in discussions about the development of civil society, active citizenship, participation and cultural exchange. With international partners, institutions and organisations MitOst exchanges experiences, discusses about urgent topics related to civil society and cultural exchange, develops campaigns and projects. MitOst is a part of these networks:

- Democracy and Human Rights Education in Europe DARE
- Networking European Citizenships Education NECE
- EU-Russia Civil Society Forum
- Initiative Mittel- und Osteuropa
- Europäische Bewegung Deutschland
- Koalition Visa Free Osteuropa
- Petersburger Dialog
- Körber-Netzwerk Bürgergesellschaft

=== International MitOst-Festival ===
The culmination of the union year is an international MitOst-Festival that takes place annually in a new city (2003:Pécs/Hungary, 2004:Vilnius/Lithuania, 2005: Wrocław/Poland, 2006: Timișoara/Romania, 2007: Görlitz/Zgorzelec, Germany/Poland). In 2008 festival took place in Uzhgorod/Ukraine, 2009 in Gdańsk/Poland, 2010 in Perm/Russia, 2011 in České Budějovice/Czech Republic, 2012 in Russe (Stadt)/Bulgaria, 2013 in Leipzig/Germany and in 2014 in Novi Sad, Serbia. In 2015 the MitOst-Festival took place in Ivano-Frankivsk in Ukraine. About 200 participants made an acquaintance with the city and its inhabitants. They presented their voluntary projects, held actions and mini projects, offered workshops and got networked. There was also a lot of space for a self-organised, lively and intercultural cooperation. A general programme of film presentations, exhibitions, discussions, readings, city tours and concerts brought the spirit of MitOst into the city, as well as it united MitOst members, partner organisations and locals.

== Foundation programmes ==
MitOst promotes cultural exchange and active citizenship in Europe and its neighbouring regions. MitOst organises international programmes and projects and serve as a platform for new forms of social engagement and projects. Projects and programmes:

=== Actors of Urban Change ===
The programme Actors of Urban Change aims to achieve sustainable and participatory urban development through cultural activities. Actors from the cultural scene, the administration, and the private sector are given an opportunity to strengthen their competencies in cross-sector collaboration. Through local projects, process-related consulting, and Europe-wide exchange, the program participants put their skills into practice. The pilot stage of the program will run from autumn of 2013 until summer of 2015. In the pilot stage of the programme teams and projects in Aivero, Athen, Barcelona, Berlin, Bratislava, Kaunas, Maribor, Zagreb and Zugdidi are supported. A programme by the Robert Bosch Foundation in cooperation with MitOst e.V.

=== Advocate Europe ===
"Advocate Europe" is an open idea challenge for innovative, multi-disciplinary and non-profit work on European integration by the Mercator Foundation, implemented by MitOst in cooperation with Liquid Democracy e.V..

=== Theodor-Heuss-Kolleg ===
As a keyplayer in a growing European network, MitOst supports especially young people in participating actively in their societies and in acting according to democratic principles. MitOst motivates, encourages and accompanies them throughout tailor-made qualifications and projects. MitOst offers various cross-border concepts, competencies and contacts for active citizenship. In regional co-operations the Theodor-Heuss-Kolleg of the Robert Bosch Stiftung and MitOst e.V. supports young adults who want to shape their environment with their own projects, and trains facilitators. The programme was founded in 2000. The Theodor-Heuss-Kolleg inspires, qualifies and supports young people in more than 30 countries in Middel-. East- and South Eastern Europe to be an active part in their society. Since 2010, the Kollege has been focusing on cooperation programs implemented with local and regional partners. This way of working began in Russia in 2006, and the newest cooperation program is "Khatwa" in Egypt (2014). Cooperationa programmes of the Theodor-Heuss-Kolleg:

- activEco (Moldova)
- Balkans, let's get up! (Albania, Republic of Macedonia, Kosovo, Montenegro, Bulgaria, Greece, Romania, Bosnia and Herzegovina, Serbia, Croatia and Slovenia)
- Bridge It! (Baltic region and Russia)
- Diversity School (Georgia)
- EcoLab (Armenia)
- From Idea to Action (Siberia/Russia)
- Khatwa (Egypt)
- Maysternya (Ukraine, Poland and Belarus)
- New Horizons (North Caucasus and rest of Russia)
- Take the Chance (Turkey)
- Time for Development (Azerbaijan)
- Social Leader Forum (Caucasus region)

=== TANDEM — Cultural Managers Exchange ===
MitOst qualifies cultural managers for international cultural exchange. Its projects support building partnerships between cultural actors from Europe and its neighbouring regions. MitOst supports art and cultural projects that strengthen societal development and local communities. Together with the European Cultural Foundation MitOst is realising the programme TANDEM that promotes long-term partnerships amongst cultural institutions. The programme was co-created by European Cultural Foundation and MitOst e.V. in 2010 and has so far supported the professional development of over 120 cultural managers coming from ca. 35 countries in wider Europe. TANDEM is an exchange programme that assists cultural organisations in developing long-term working relationships, knowledge development and networking opportunities with project partners from Europe and beyond. The aim of the programme is to connect and inspire cultural managers by supporting the sharing of knowledge and experience across geographical and cultural borders.

==== TANDEM Ukraine − European Union − Moldova ====
The first Tandem scheme was launched in 2011–2012 to foster cultural cooperation between the EU, Ukraine and Moldova. Supported by the European Commission CULTURE programme and the Robert Bosch Stiftung, it included 50 participants from more than 30 European cities.

==== TANDEM Turkey-European Union ====
TANDEM Turkey–European Union aims at establishing long-term partnerships between cultural organisations from Turkey and the EU countries. It is targeted on engaging participants in an intense international collaboration process, which includes realisation of a shared interdisciplinary project, linked to their cultural expertise. It is an initiative of the European Cultural Foundation, MitOst, Anadolu Kültür, and supported by Stiftung Mercator. The programme successfully realised two rounds (2011/12 & 2013/14) and was able to bring together 64 cultural managers.

==== TANDEM Community & Participation ====
TANDEM–Community & Participation aims at establishing long-term partnerships between cultural organisations working in the field of community arts, voluntary or amateur arts and (non-formal) arts education. The program focuses on citizens' inclusion and active participation in local arts & culture and community life. It is for cultural managers from the Netherlands and its neighbouring regions/countries: Germany, Belgium and UK. This programme is an initiative of the Dutch Cultural Participation Fund (FCP) and European Cultural Foundation (ECF), implemented by MitOst e.V. in partnership with the British Council and the Dutch Centre of Expertise for Cultural Education and Amateur Arts (LKCA).

==== TANDEM Shaml ====
Tandem Shaml offers eight cultural organisations based in Germany and other European countries (incl. Turkey) a unique opportunity to establish long-term cooperation links with partner organisations from the Arab countries across the Mediterranean. Tandem Shaml – Cultural Managers Exchange Europe – Arab Region – is an initiative which was developed by the European Cultural Foundation and MitOst in collaboration with Al Mawred Al Thaqafy and Anadolu Kültür. The programme is financially supported by the Robert Bosch Stiftung, Stichting DOEN and Mimeta.

==== TANDEM Ukraine ====
TANDEM "Dialogue for Change" builds on the experience of the pilot scheme TANDEM Ukraine – EU – Moldova (2011–2012) and is implemented in the framework of the MitOst/UNAEDI project "Dialogue for Change" that aims to strengthen civil society actors in Ukraine. The programme offers cultural and civil society organisations a platform for long-term cooperation between change agents from Ukraine and the 28 EU member states to strengthen their capacities in community development and conflict resolution through the arts.
