= International Renaissance Foundation =

Ukrainian non-governmental organisation

- Міжнародний фонд "Відродження"
- Formation: April 1990
- Founder: George Soros
- Type: NGO
- Purpose: Promotion of an open and democratic society
- Headquarters: Kyiv, Ukraine
- Region served: Ukraine, Central and Eastern Europe, former Soviet Union
- Official language: Ukrainian
- Leader: Olexander Sushko
- Parent organization: Open Society Foundations
- Budget: Over $350 million (1990-2023)
- Website: www.irf.ua

The International Renaissance Foundation (IRF; Ukrainian: Міжнародний фонд "Відродження", romanized: Mizhnarodnyi fond "Vidrodzhennia") is a Ukrainian non-governmental organisation founded by George Soros. It was founded in April 1990. IRF is an integral part of the Open Society Foundations which incorporates national and regional foundations in more than thirty countries around the world, primarily in Central and Eastern Europe, as well as the former Soviet Union. These foundations share a common goal of supporting educational, social and legal initiatives that promote the development and establishment of an open society.

Its main objective is to provide financial and operational assistance to the development of an open and democratic society in Ukraine by supporting key civic initiatives in this area. Over the period from 1990 to 2023, the International Renaissance Foundation supported numerous Ukrainian non-governmental organizations, community groups, academic and cultural institutions, publishing houses etc. in the amount of over $350 million.

== Key areas ==
The International Renaissance Foundation is one of the largest Ukrainian charitable foundations that has been working in Ukraine since 1990 to build an open society where everyone feels worthy, where citizens are involved in shaping the state, and where the authorities are transparent and accountable. Their mission is to build a Ukraine where human rights are protected and positive changes work for the benefit of citizens.

IRF is providing financial support to the projects that encourage European integration, strengthening the impact of civil society and its control over the government, the system of civic protection of rights and establishment of the rule of law in Ukraine, penitentiary reform, civic activities of ethnic minorities, educational and public health reforms, publishing activities etc.

As for today, key areas of action include:

- Democracy and good governance. Foundation aims to prevent collapse of democratic reforms in post-war Ukraine and centralisation of power in the state administration system. They also promote accountable and transparent recovery that engages civil society and takes into account the principles of environmental protection.
- Human rights and justice. Foundation is contributing to holding Russia accountable for war crimes. They aim to contribute to justice reforms in Ukraine and protecting the fundamental freedom of ukrainians.
- Europe and the world. The Foundation supports Ukraine's European integration as a means of implementing effective reforms in the areas of democratisation, governance and justice based on the best international practices.
- Public health. Foundation is promoting the development of a cost-effective and non-discriminatory healthcare system, transparent and rational spending of public funds. They aim to ensure equal access to essential medicines and proper treatment, including vulnerable groups.
- Social capital. Foundation is building and strengthening communities that are backbone of an open society, creating prerequisites for public dialogue and cohesion based on democratic values. They try to expand of international solidarity with Ukraine in the intellectual, academic and cultural spheres.

== Transparency ==
IRF keeps public informed of its programs and their implementation by holding news conferences and presentations, via their official website, etc. Foundation employees, as well as its regional information partners consult public on IRF-supported projects and grants.

== Principles ==
IRF makes its grants only to non-governmental organizations. As a rule, the International Renaissance Foundation announces project competitions in advance. Grants are made to Ukrainian organizations whose projects meet the priorities of the competitions. At the same time, IRF considers applications of citizens regarding the financing of various projects, whose aims meet the Foundation’s objectives. Apart from making grants to other organizations, IRF conducts its own operational activities by implementing projects in priority action areas.

IRF finances national programs from its budget upon the recommendations of the Executive Board and Program Boards. The Foundation's experience in Ukraine and its close cooperation with other donor organizations in Central and Eastern Europe make it possible to monitor changes in Ukrainian society. Moreover, IRF attempts to predict these changes. IRF program activities are predominantly oriented to the European experience.

== See also ==
- Ukraine Crisis Media Center
- Open Society Foundations
- George Soros
