= Justice for Journalists =

Foundation for journalists protection

Justice for Journalists Foundation
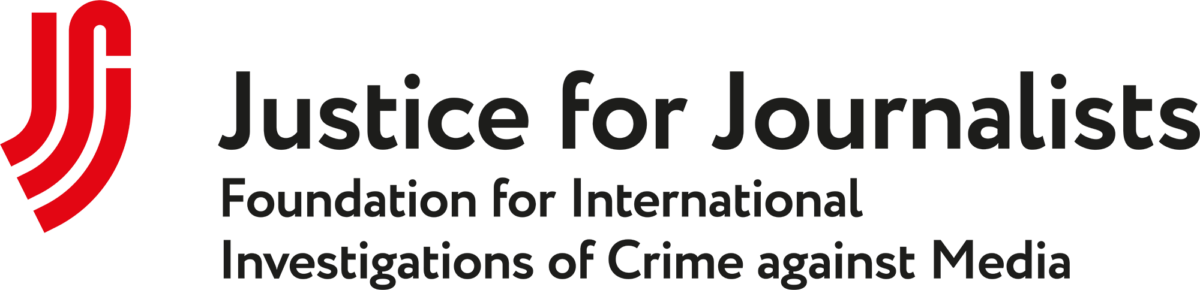
- Type: Charity
- Purpose: Journalists safety, education
- Location: London, United Kingdom
- Website: jfj.fund///

Justice for Journalists Foundation is a London-based charity (Registered Charity Number 1201812) whose mission is to fight impunity for attacks against media. Based in London, its main goal is to protect journalists from the abuse of their right to freedom of expression, increase public awareness about attacks on media workers and provide journalists with the knowledge and skills necessary to protect themselves from professional risks.

The Charity collaborates with international NGOs, journalists, experts, academia, think-tanks, educational and research organisations. Among the partners of Justice for Journalists are Reporters Without Borders, the Foreign Policy Centre, Article 19, Charter 97, ACOS Alliance and Rory Peck Trust. The Charity is one of the 15 partner organisations of the Council of Europe's Safety of Journalists Platform.

In 2024, the Charity became a member of the Global Forum for Media Development, an international network of over 200 journalism support and media development organisations working across more than 70 countries. The Charity is a member of the CASE Coalition and UK Anti-SLAPP Coalition. The Charity is an observer of the National Committee for the Safety of Journalists in the UK. The Charity is also a signatory of the ACOS Alliance, a unique global coalition of 150+ news organizations, journalist associations and press freedom NGOs working together to champion safe and responsible journalism practices.

In 2025, the foundation was listed as an undesirable organization in Russia.

== Activities ==
The Charity's activities consist of three main areas, as stated on its website.

- Media risk mapping via monitoring, analysing and publicising violence and abuse against media workers;
- Training and education via online and offline media safety trainings in Orkhan Dzhemal Media Safety Academy, Russian-language safety training for professional journalists, citizen journalists, and bloggers.
- Raising public awareness about the realities of media work worldwide via visual and print materials, conferences, roundtables, and seminars in support of such initiatives and activities conducted by other charitable organisations involved in the protection of the right to free expression.

=== Investigative Grants Programme ===
Between January 2019 and September 2024, the Justice for Journalists Foundation ran an investigative grant programme, which over the five years has supported over 80 media outlets, independent journalists, and media freedom NGOs from 40 countries. Currently, Justice for Journalists Foundation is focused on its other activities to investigate violence and abuse against media workers.

In 2019, thanks to the support from the Foundation's grant program, the Kyiv Post media outlet published a special project called Dying for Truth, a series of investigative articles about violence against journalists in Ukraine.

In 2019, the Charity has supported two investigations into the murder of Maltese investigative journalist Daphne Caruana Galizia — the book Murder on the Malta Express: Who Killed Daphne Caruana Galizia? by Manuel Delia, Carlo Bonini, and John Sweeny and the comprehensive joint report titled Justice delayed: the assassination of Daphne Caruana Galizia and Malta's deteriorating press freedom climate by Reporters Without Borders and independent Maltese outlet The Shift News. The book Murder on the Malta Express: Who Killed Daphne Caruana Galizia? won the National Book Council award for Literary non-fiction in Maltese and English.

In September 2020, the Charity supported the investigation into the murder of journalist Pavel Sheremet by the independent media outlet Zaborona.

Between 2020 and 2024, the Justice for Journalists Foundation contributed significant resources towards exploring of how SLAPP is used to halt media workers' investigative efforts. One of the grant recipients, the Foreign Policy Centre, published two Unsafe for Scrutiny reports. As part of its work under the Unsafe for Scrutiny project, the Foreign Policy Centre, along with 21 other organizations, including the Justice for Journalists Foundation, has published a joint policy paper on countering legal intimidation and SLAPP in the UK. The policy paper briefly outlines the common hallmarks of legal intimidation and SLAPPs in the UK context, as well as five key principles for mitigating this threat, with a view to it forming a starting point for legislative and regulatory initiatives to address this issue in the UK. In partnership with the Foreign Policy Centre and International Bar Association's Human Rights Institute (IBAHRI), the Charity organised three Anti-SLAPP Conferences in London, UK which brought together dozens of experts from across the globe to examine the impact SLAPPs has on journalists, media freedom and wider society. Similar conferences were supported by the Charity in Georgia, Malta, Ireland and in Scotland. The Charity is also a member of the CASE Coalition and UK Anti-SLAPP Coalition.

In 2020, the Charity supported the investigation into the murder of Somali journalists that has been quoted by various media outlets. After the release of the investigation, Somalia's federal authorities said they would open a full probe into the criminals and officials suspected to have committed crimes against journalists including dozens of murder cases of journalists in the Horn of African country since 1992.

In 2020, the Charity supported monitoring of court cases involving media outlets and journalists in Armenia that has been conducted by Committee to Protect Freedom of Expression. Findings of the report were used by the United States Department of State in the report on human right practices in Armenia.

In 2021, the Charity has supported four-part series investigation into the unresolved killing of three Nigerian journalists having been on assignments between 2019 and 2020. Nigerian investigative journalist Patrick Egwu looked into these murders, those behind them, and the growing calls for justice by families of victims and press freedom groups.

In 2022, Channel 4 commissioned a documentary Nazanin by filmmaker and journalist Darius Bazargan. The film supported by the Justice for Journalists Foundation grant gives exclusive access into one of the biggest international news stories and follows the life of Nazanin Zaghari-Ratcliffe's husband Richard and his family as he campaigned to bring his wife Nazanin home from detention in Iran.

In 2022, with the help of the Charity, the Novaya Gazeta. Europe released a documentary titled THIS MESSAGE (MATERIAL) CREATED AND DISTRIBUTED that reveals the stories of journalists who continue to do their professional work in Russia, where independent journalism is almost prohibited, and all legal protection is destroyed.

In 2022, the Charity supported the release of the podcast Pig Iron by Tortoise where journalist Basia Cummings investigates Christopher Allen's death on a distant frontline in South Sudan. In 2024, the podcast has been sold to BBC Sounds. In 2023, the Pig Iron won the British Podcast Awards in the Documentary category.

In 2022, the Charity supported an investigative report by The Sentry which exposed how South Sudan's National Security Service, a highly militarised agency operating under the supervision of President Salva Kiir, has cemented control over the country and its various institutions, including the independent media.

In 2023, the Charity supported the documentary Of Caravan and The Dogs by filmmaker Askold Kurov and documentary Black Snow, directed by American journalist and filmmaker Alina Simone and produced by Kirstine Barfod. The documentary Black Snow has been nominated. for the Best Documentary at the 47th News and Documentary Emmy Awards.

Also that year, the Charity supported the investigation of the Balkan Investigative Reporting Network (BIRN) into the covert tracking of journalists in Central and South-East Europe. BIRN;s survey of journalists in 15 countries who have been put under surveillance by intelligence services, criminal groups or private companies over the past few decades reveal how the monitoring of media workers remains a significant issue in Central and South-East Europe.

In 2024, the Charity supported the MLSA report In the Shadow of Two Palaces: Conversations with Exiled Journalists from Turkey and Russia. The report features narratives and interviews with 11 journalists who were forced to leave their homes in Turkey and Russia due to increasing pressures on free media. In 2022, the Foundation also supported another MLSA project into SLAPP cases in Turkey.

In 2024, during the International Journalism Festival in Perugia, FLIP and Media Defence hosted the side event showing the documentary Recent surveillance cases in Colombia, El Salvador and Mexico, supported by the Charity's Investigative Grant Programme.

=== Media Risk Map and Research ===
The Media Risk Map project is a daily monitoring and categorization of attacks on journalists, bloggers and media workers. It currently monitors attacks in 12 post-Soviet countries (excluding the Baltic states). Data on attacks are available from 2017 to the present day in English. The data from the Media Risk Map is constantly used for public presentations and academic purposes. The Charity works together with various universities in the UK, including University of Sheffield, University of Liverpool and their initiative in co-operation with UNESCO Safety of Journalists and others.

The Foundation published reports on attacks against journalists, bloggers and media workers in Armenia, Azerbaijan, Belarus, Georgia, Kazakhstan, Kyrgyzstan, Moldova, Russia, Tajikistan, Turkmenistan, Uzbekistan and Ukraine for 2017-2020. The reports were cited by various media outlets, such as Novaya Gazeta, RTVI, Deutsche Welle, and Meduza.

In May 2019, the Justice for Journalists Foundation prepared a project with the NGO Index on Censorship to monitor attacks and media rights violations related to the COVID-19 pandemic.

As part of the Risk Map project, the Justice for Journalists Foundation has been regularly monitoring attacks against journalists and bloggers in Central Asia.

As part of the Council of Europe's Safety of Journalists Platform, the Justice for Journalists Foundation contributes the data it collects for the Media Risk Map to the Alerts and participates in the writing of yearly reports and statements.

In 2023, the Charity presented results of an expert survey among over 100 Russian and Belarusian journalists who were forced to relocate to safer countries and currently living in exile.

In 2023-2024, the Charity, in partnership with the National Union of Journalists of Ukraine and with financial support issued by UNESCO, has been collecting open-source evidence and satellite imagery of attacks on media workers during the war in order to create safety recommendations, risk assessments and HEFAT training for journalists heading to the war zone. Over the course of the project, the Charity has obtained and processed information about 35 instances of both fatal and non-fatal attacks against media workers in Ukraine, involving at least 55 journalists from countries including Ukraine, Turkey, the Czech Republic, the USA, Russia, Ireland, the UK, Italy, France, Japan, Denmark, Germany, Switzerland, Sweden, Portugal, and Lithuania. The Charity has identified the key risks journalists were facing while reporting from the war zone and developed preliminary safety recommendations for media workers covering the war in Ukraine.

In 2026, the Justice for Journalists Foundation and the Centre for Freedom of the Media, University of Sheffield, announced their collaboration on the research project “Profiling Impunity for Human Rights Violations Against Journalists: A Systematic Account of State-Based Harm and Practices of Resistance.” As part of the collaboration, the Justice for Journalists Foundation contributed its extensive dataset with almost 26,500 verified attacks on media workers in post-Soviet states.

=== The Orkhan Dzhemal Media Safety Academy ===
In 2021, the Charity launched the Media Safety Academy, named after the war reporter Orkhan Dzhemal, who was killed in CAR in 2018. The Academy offers free courses for Russian-speaking professional and citizen journalists, freelancers, and bloggers. The Academy features five core modules developed by 14 experts from nine countries: risk analysis, physical safety and first aid, cyber security, phycological safety and legal security.

The Media Safety Academy partners with the Council of Europe, Zaborona Media, Belarusian Association of Journalists, Rory Peck Trust, Frontline Club and IREX to provide training for media workers.

The Media Safety Academy also offers offline training tailored for the specific needs of Russian-speaking media workers. Over the course of the Charity's work, 600+ media workers underwent media security training with its experts in Risk Assessment, Physical Safety, Legal and Cyber security and Psychological resilience. In September 2024, the Media Safety Academy launched a new training in open-source intelligence (OSINT).

In 2024, via the partnership with the Ukrainian-based 2404 Foundation the Charity supported HEFAT (Hostile Environment First Aid Training) and VR safety training for over 1000 journalists, editors, freelancers, local producers, documentarians, photographers and videographers working in Ukraine. The initiative addressed the issue of safety of journalists and media workers operating in hostile environments to ensure their ability to report from the war zones. In October 2024, 2402 Foundation has received the results of an independent study on the effectiveness of the HEFAT training programme.

=== Trouble with the Truth podcast by Lana Estemirova ===
Between 2020 and 2024, the Charity collaborated with journalist Lana Estemirova, daughter of Chechen human rights activist Natalya Estemirova, murdered in 2009. Lana produced podcast, Trouble with the Truth, in which she interviewed independent journalists from around the world and discussed the threats and risks specific to media workers in their regions. The podcast gives journalists a platform to share their work and talk about the risks they face because of it. Currently, there are two seasons available to stream via Apple and Google Podcast, Spotify, Soundcloud and YouTube.

==== Season 1 ====
In the Season 1, Lana Estemitova interviewed Belarusian journalists Alex Kokcharov and Hanna Liubakova about the crackdown on Belarusian media; journalist and filmmaker Darius Bazargan about his documentary on Nazanin Zaghari-Ratcliffe; Georgian journalist Mariam Nikuradze about the attacks on journalists during the Tbilisi Pride; filmmaker Paola Desiderio about her documentary 'The Law of Silence' about the horrific murder of the investigative journalist Silvia Duzan; Azerbaijani journalist Khadija Ismayilova about her investigations into the Azerbaijani laundromat; founder of Popular Front Jake Hanrahan about conflict reporting; Russian journalists Semyon Kvasha and Ilya Rozhdestvensky about the grim prospects for independent journalism in Russia; Drew Sullivan from the Organized Crime and Corruption Reporting Project and Roman Anin from Istores about Pandora Papers and others.

==== Season 2 ====
In the Season 2, Lana Estemirova's guests were the Financial Times correspondent Polina Ivanova who talked about the arrest of the Wall Street Journal reporter Evan Gershkovich; a Coda Story award-winning reporter Isobel Cockerell who talked about disinformation campaigns amplified on social media platforms; Editor-in-chief of Zaborona Media and the co-founder of 2402 Foundation Kateryna Serhatskova talking about the war against Ukrainian journalists; India's most prominent journalist Rana Ayyub; Natalia Krapiva, the Senior Tech-Legal Counsel at Access Now and others.

=== Events, Partnerships and Advocacy ===
The Charity participates in various offline and online public events themed around media safety and campaign for media freedom along with other international press freedom organizations.

==== United Nations ====
Justice for Journalists Foundation participates in sessions of the United Nations Human Rights Committee. Also, the information about Georgia was incorporated in the concluding observations on the fifth periodic report on Georgia released by the Office of the High Commissioner for Human Rights (OHCHR) on July 27. Also, the information about Georgia was incorporated in the concluding observations on the fifth periodic report on Georgia released by the Office of the High Commissioner for Human Rights (OHCHR) on July 27.

In 2022, Moldova's human rights record was examined by the UN Human Rights Council's Universal Periodic Review (UPR) Working Group. Together with Association of Independent Press of Moldova (API), the Justice for Journalists Foundation has contributed to the UPR by submitting the joint report for inclusion in the summary of stakeholder submissions.

In 2022-2024, the Charity also submitted reports about the situation with media freedom and attacks on media workers in Azerbaijan, Turkmenistan, Georgia, Russia, Uzbekistan and Kyrgyzstan.

Along with representatives of Memorial, OVD-Info, Agora, and Public Verdict, the Charity briefed the UN Human Rights Committee members on violations of the independent media workers' rights by the Russian Federation.

In 2023, together with Article 19, OVD-Info and Access Now, the Charity submitted a UPR Submission that gauges the constantly worsening situation of freedom of expression in Russia for the 44th Session of the Working Group.

In 2024, the Charity submitted an input to the UN Special Rapporteur's on the promotion and protection of the right to freedom of opinion and expression report addressing key trends, threats and challenges for media and media workers in exile.

==== UNESCO ====
In May 2024, during the UNESCO Press Freedom Day in Santiago, Chile, the Justice for Journalists Foundation and Journalismfund organised a side event Investigating Environmental Crimes: Can You Cover Coal Mining or Water Scarcity and Stay Alive in the Gabriela Mistral Cultural Centre. The trailer for the documentary Black Snow, supported by the Charity's Investigative Grant Programme, was screened, and a lively discussion on the challenges of global environmental journalism followed.

==== Council of Europe ====
On January 31, 2021, the Justice for Journalists Foundation became partner to the Council of Europe's Platform to promote the protection of journalism and safety of journalists. The Justice for Journalists Foundation signed the agreement to join the Platform with the Council of Europe Secretary General, Marija Pejčinović Burić. The Foundation constantly participates in the events and meetings organised by the Council of Europe and contributes to the issue of statements and writing of the yearly reports.

==== OSCE ====
In 2023, the Charity participated in the ninth South East Europe Media Conference organised by the OSCE Representative on Freedom of the Media (RFoM) in collaboration with OSCE field operations from South East Europe in Skopje. The conference focused on the importance of independent journalism as well as on the need to seriously address the challenges related to the dynamics of the digital realm to promote and protect democratic values. Special attention was given to improving the safety and working conditions for media professionals.

In 2023, the Charity, in partnership with the Norwegian Helsinki Committee and People in Need, organised two side events during the Warsaw Human Dimension Conference. Following events, JFJ has issued a statement calling on authorities of Azerbaijan, Belarus, Kazakhstan, Kyrgyzstan, Russia, Tajikistan, Turkmenistan and Uzbekistan to release the imprisoned journalists and bring their laws and practices into compliance with international commitments.

The Charity contributed to the launch of the OSCE RFoM Safety of Journalists Toolbox. The toolbox is a part of the project on Safety of Journalists of the OSCE Representative on Freedom of the Media (RFoM).

==== Other events ====
On April 15, 2021, the Justice for Journalists Foundation participated in the annual #UNCOVERED conference of the Investigative Journalism for Europe (IJ4EU) programme. The Justice for Journalists Foundation participated on the panel SLAPPs: A Legal Threat to Cross-Border Journalism along Flutura Kusari (Legal Advisor at the European Centre for Press and Media Freedom), Viola von Cramon (Member of the Media Working Group at the European Parliament) and Per Agerman (Stockholm-based freelance journalist, writer for Realtid.se).

On November 2, 2021, to mark the International Day to End Impunity for Crimes against Journalists, the Justice for Journalists Foundation and the Foreign Policy Centre organized a webinar «Media freedom in Malta. Murder, Disinformation and Legal Intimidation».

In 2024, the Charity organised several events in the London-based Frontline Club: the screening of The Crossfire – an investigative documentary into the deaths of Andrej Mironov and Andrea Rocchelli and the subsequent incarceration of a Ukrainian soldier, Vitaly Markiv, who was wrongfully accused of the journalists' deaths. In October 2024, the Charity organised the screening of the documentary On the Frontier: The Heroic Story of the Journalist from the Frontline Newspaper presented by the National Union of Journalists of Ukraine.

In 2024 and 2025, together with the Foreign Policy Centre and the International Bar Association’s Human Rights Institute, the Justice for Journalists Foundation organised the UK Media Freedom Forum in partnership with City St George’s, University of London. The Forum explored a number of themes impacting media freedom around the world, including the use of lawfare and strategic lawsuits against public participation (SLAPPs), transnational repression, misinformation and disinformation, and media literacy.
