= Research Centre for East European Studies =

German research center

The Research Centre for East European Studies (Forschungsstelle Osteuropa) at the University of Bremen was founded in 1982. Under the directorship of Professor Wolfgang Eichwede, it has since then carved its own distinctive niche within the German academic community through an intensive study of recent developments in the culture and society of Central and East European countries.

Following the collapse of Communist rule, the institute's research concentrated both on the cultural and socio-political continuities across the period of upheaval, and on the newly emerging potential for innovation in political and economic culture and cultural identity. In contrast to the predominantly economic approach to the transformation taking place in Eastern and Central Eastern Europe, the Research Centre places the traditions and potential of the region at the centre of attention. The institute endeavors to enable an understanding of the countries from the inside, and in this way make a genuine contribution to the drawing together of Europe.

Even before the radical political changes this was one of the tasks of the Research Centre: during the 1980s, it gave attention above all to the appearance of independent artistic and intellectual creativity. The focus on dissident culture was intertwined with the aspiration to track informal tendencies and intellectual approaches which could give an insight into the societies of the region. Alongside its research, the institute was able to build up a comprehensive and internationally renowned archive of Samizdat literature. It contains banned or unofficial artistic, literary and academic writings from Poland, the Soviet Union, Czechoslovakia, Hungary and the GDR (East Germany). The Russian collection also includes the private archives of leading Russian figures. A third branch of the institute's activity is public work in the form of cultural and political consultancy in Germany and abroad.

In August 2026, the Research Centre for East European Studies was declared an undesirable organization in Russia.

== Structure ==
The Research Centre has charitable status and is registered in the federal states of Bremen, Hamburg and North Rhine-Westphalia. It was initially funded by the Volkswagen Foundation, but since 1986/7 it has received subsidies from the joint committee of the educational ministries of the German federal republics. The institute is closely connected with the University of Bremen, not only in that it is situated on the site of the university, but also in that its director holds a professorial chair at the university, and through concrete agreements and cooperation. The Research Centre has three subdivisions: research, the archive and library and public work in the form of cultural and political consultancy.

== Current projects ==
Contemporary and cultural history

Using its extensive archive, which contains well in excess of 150,000 Samizdat documents and more than 300 private archives, the Research Centre organised a series of large-scale exhibitions titled Samizdat. Alternative Culture in Central and Eastern Europe from the 1960s to the 1980s. The exhibition in Berlin was opened by the mayor of Budapest and former human rights activist Gábor Demszky, that in Prague by the presidents of Germany and Czechoslovakia Johannes Rau and Václav Havel, in Brussels by the EU commissioner Günter Verheugen and in Budapest by the German foreign minister Joschka Fischer. The exhibitions were received enthusiastically by the public. In Prague alone there were 75,000 visitors.

The Research Centre has built on this success by putting together another exhibition Counterviews. Photographs of the Political and Cultural Opposition in Eastern Europe 1956-1989. It takes the form of a touring exhibition which at present travels throughout Europe.

Alongside comprehensive individual research projects on dissent and society throughout Eastern and Central Eastern Europe, a joint research association funded by the Volkswagen Foundation has started its work in collaboration with institutes in Moscow, Warsaw, Poznan, Prague and Budapest on the topic ‘The other Europe – the 1960s-1980s. Dissent in Politics and Society; Cultural Alternatives. Contributions to a Comparative History’. In this way, the Research Centre in cooperation with other German universities and partner organizations in the USA and Western Europe will become an important centre for the study of the contemporary history of the Soviet Union and Eastern Europe.

At the moment a database is being created for the unique collections within the Bremen archive, which on account of its use of five different languages resembles a large-scale pilot project. A regular series of publications giving an overview of the contents of the archive will be forthcoming in 2008.

Studies of the present - politics, economics and culture

In this area, the most notable research projects have in the past few years dealt with economic culture and informal politics. The topics investigated included taxation, the role of trust in business relations, the political influence of companies and the development of corporate governance. The majority of these projects were made possible through third-party funds.

Other recent areas of research (some of which were comparative) include the development of a new state symbolism in Russia and Slovakia, processes of the construction of identity and the politics of history in Poland, the Czech Republic and Russia. In addition, there are individual studies on various countries and regions.

A new focal point is the integration of the former socialist EU-member states in the decision-making process of the European Union. Above all, it is concerned with the role of civic interest and lobby group. Within the Sixth Framework Programme for Research of the European Union, the institute is a team leader in the integrated project, which is headed by the European University Institute in Florence. A further third-party funded research project investigates how the Polish, Czech and Slovakian trade unions cope with EU governance.

Since 2000 the Research Centre has organized conferences for young scholars specializing in Eastern Europe. At the moment this is funded by the Otto-Wolff Foundation. In addition the Research Center organizes summer schools Changing Europe, sponsored by the Volkswagen Foundation. The first one took place in 2006 and selected contributions have been published. The aim of the summer schools is to bring together a select group of doctoral students from throughout the world and assist their integration into the research community of East European studies. Over 40 academics of international renown are involved in various functions under the supervision of the Research Centre in the work of the summer school.

== Publications ==
The results of the institute's research are published in two series (‘Studies in East European Culture and Society’ published by LIT-Verlag and ‘Changing Europe’ published by Ibidem-Verlag) and as individual volumes. The archive of the Research Centre produces its own series of works published by Ibidem-Verlag. In addition, the Research Centre brings out in journal form the series Working papers and materials of the Research Centre for East European Studies, which contains 10 issues each year.

Moreover, the subsection dealing with studies of the present offers regular e-mail services, which include updates on individual countries in the region in German and English. Taken together, they have over 16,000 subscribers from the worlds of politics, economics and the media, as well as interested members of the public. In cooperation with the Koszalin Institute of Comparative European Studies the Research Center offers regular bibliographic e-mail servises, which cover books and articles recently published in English and German on politics, foreign policy, economic and social affairs.

== International Partner Organizations ==
The Research Centre amongst others works together with the following institutions in the former communist states:

The non-governmental organization MEMORIAL in Moscow, which like the Research Centre has an academic interest in Soviet dissidents, the Russian State University for the Humanities and the Moscow Higher School of Economics, with which a lively exchange program of researchers takes place in Russia.

The Institute of Contemporary History in Prague and the Institute of Sociology of the Academy of Sciences of the Czech Republic in the Czech Republic. The archive KARTA in Warsaw and the Chair of Polish Studies and Comparative Literature at the University of Poznan in Poland. The Faculty of Political Sciences at the Comenius University Bratislava in the Slovak Republic.

Furthermore, international networks exist with institutions in the USA (e.g. Hoover, Harvard and the Zimmerli Art Museum, New Brunswick) and Western Europe (e.g. ETH Zürich, the University of Amsterdam and Cambridge University).
