= Eurotopics =

News aggregator maintained by the German federal government agency

Logo

Eurotopics, self-styled euro|topics, is a European news aggregator published by the German federal government agency Bundeszentrale für politische Bildung. The online platform's self-described aim is to reflect diversity of opinions, ideas and moods in Europe, and to follow key debates on political, economic and social issues. The goal is to contribute to the formation of a European public sphere. It was nominated for the Grimme Online Award in the "Information" category in 2009.

The daily press review has a correspondents network that stretches across Europe and surveys the press for opinion pieces from 30 different European countries, namely the EU, the UK, Russia, Ukraine, Switzerland, and Turkey. It may be read online or subscribed to as a free email newsletter in five different languages, German, English, French, Russian and Turkish.

A European media database provides information about more than 500 print and online media in over 30 countries, including details about their political profile, publishers and circulation figures. It also contains detailed descriptions of Europe's media landscapes.

The Network for Reporting on Eastern Europe n-ost has produced the press review since May 2008. From the end of 2005 to April 2008 the press review was published by Perlentaucher Medien GmbH (Berlin) in cooperation with Courrier International (Paris).
