= Institute for War & Peace Reporting =

Nonprofit organization

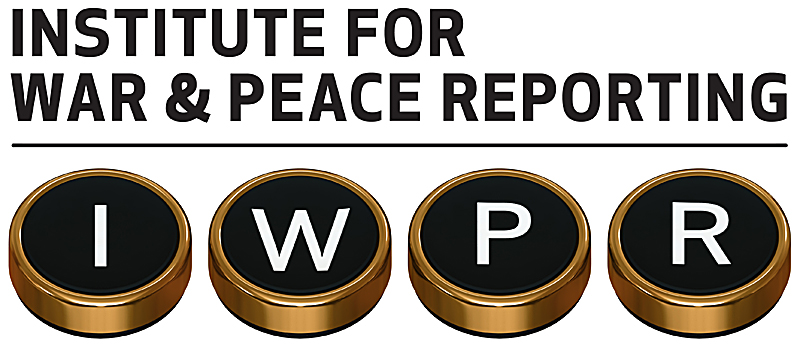
- Motto: Giving Voice, Driving Change
- Established: 1991 (35 years ago)
- Types: nonprofit organization
- Legal status: Non-profit
- Headquarters: London, UK
- Directors: Anthony Borden
- Revenue: 6,791,112 pound sterling (2024)
- Employees: 25 (2024)
- Website: iwpr.net

The Institute for War & Peace Reporting (IWPR) is an independent nonprofit organization that trains and provide publishing opportunities for professional and citizen journalists. IWPR is registered in the UK as a charity (charity reg. no: 1027201, company reg. no: 2744185); the US under IRS Section 501(c)(3) and NL as a charitable foundation.

== History ==
IWPR was founded in 1991 under the name Yugofax. Initially it was a newsletter that reported on the troubling developments throughout the Balkans from a balanced perspective. As the conflict developed into an all out war, Yugofax newsletter changed its name to Balkan War Report.

Eventually, in late 1995, after the Dayton Peace Accord was signed ending the war in Bosnia, the newsletter expanded its area of focus to other global trouble spots (initially mainly focusing on ex-Soviet republics) and adjusted its name to War Report.

In 1998, the newsletter changed its name again to the Institute for War & Peace Reporting and registered as a non-governmental organization.

In 2026, the institute was designated as an undesirable organization in Russia.

== Deaths of members ==
International Media Awards in 2008 for her story, Honour Killing Sparks Fears of New Iraqi Conflict, published by IWPR in May 2007, about the brutal murder of a young Yezidi woman in the town of Bashika.

On May 2, 2015, the previous IWPR Iraq director, Ammar Al Shahbander, was killed in a car bomb attack, along with up to 17 other people.

On October 18, 2015, the IWPR acting Iraq director, Jacqueline Anne Sutton (a.k.a. Jacky Sutton), age 50, was found hanged in a bathroom stall of Istanbul's Atatürk International Airport. She had been on her way to Irbil.

On 6 July 2020, Hisham al-Hashimi was seriously wounded outside his home in Zayouna, Baghdad from an attack by gunmen on 3 motorbikes. He died in Ibn Al-Nafees Hospital shortly after arrival.
