= N-ost =

n-ost – Network for Border Crossing Journalism e.V. is a European journalism network. The media NGO has a focus on Eastern Europe and is committed to cross-border and multiperspective reporting. n-ost connects journalists and media, supports research and provides training: 500 correspondents, photographers and editors work from across Europe. n-ost headquarters are based in Berlin, Germany.

== Goals ==
n-ost aims to break through national media bubbles by bringing together journalists and media outlets from across the EU, Eastern Europe, and their neighboring countries. Its vision is the creation of an integrated European media space where cross-border collaborations take place.

== Projects and topics ==
Since May 2008, n-ost has produced the multilingual European online debate portal eurotopics.net on behalf of the German Federal Agency for Civic Education. Through projects such as PULSE – Europe beyond the beat, European Focus, and European Images, the network also promotes European networking journalism.

Since 2022, n-ost has increasingly engaged in support of journalism in Ukraine, for example through the projects Fight for Facts and The Europe Ukraine Desk. Additional projects focusing on partner countries of the Eastern Partnership include Competing Narratives, Seizing Synergies, and in-depth.

n-ost organizes journalistic research trips in order to highlight particular topics or regions and conducts workshops and training for media professionals.

n-ost is active in ten Focus Areas: Networking Journalism, European Public Spheres, Foreign Reporting, Documentary Photography, Investigative Journalism, (Dis)Information, Queerness & Feminism, Journalism in Ukraine, Climate Journalism, and Decolonization & Exile.

Since 2006 the organization hosts the n-ost media conference in various European cities. From 2007 to 2018, it awarded the n-ost Reportage Prize. Since 2014, n-ost has awarded the Eastern Europe Investigative Reporting Prize.

== Partners and funding ==
n-ost works closely with other journalists' organisations and networks pursuing similar aims, both in Germany and at an international level, such as Reporters Without Borders, Netzwerk Recherche, Lviv Media Forum, Belarus Press Club, Arena for Journalism, Voxeurop, OBCT, BIRN, dekoder, ECPMF, and Are We Europe.

n-ost is a co-founder of the Forum for Nonprofit Journalism, a member of the Forum Media and Development (fome) and the Global Investigative Journalism Network (GIJN).

n-ost's projects are financed by public and private German and European funds (including the German Federal Ministry for Economic Cooperation and Development, the Federal Foreign Office, and the European Commission) as well as through donations.

== Organisation ==
n-ost was founded in Berlin in 2006 as a non-profit organization in the legal form of a registered association. The current board consists of Dóra Diseri, Andreas Bock, Tamina Kutscher, Aleksander Palikot, and Anastasia Rodi.

In July 2025, the n-ost NGO was declared an undesirable organization in Russia.
