= WhiteBIT =

International company that develops products for digital asset management

- Type: Private
- Industry: Cryptocurrency exchange, financial technology
- Founded: 2018; 8 years ago
- Founder: Volodymyr Nosov
- Headquarters: Zug, Switzerland
- Area served: Worldwide
- Key people: Volodymyr Nosov (founder and CEO)
- Products: Cryptocurrency exchange, blockchain platform, decentralized exchange, mining pool, Whitepay, Whitechain, WhiteBIT Coin (WBT)
- Number of employees: 1,300 (2025)
- Parent: W Group
- Website: whitebit.com

WhiteBIT is a cryptocurrency exchange founded in 2018 by Volodymyr Nosov. It is the main business of W Group, a fintech holding whose other products include the crypto processing service Whitepay, the Whitechain blockchain, the WhiteBIT Coin (WBT) token and the Counter-Strike 2 skin marketplace white.market. Initially based in Lithuania, the company is headquartered in Switzerland and operates through subsidiaries in several jurisdictions. In 2025 the company reported about 8 million users.

== History ==
WhiteBIT was founded in 2018 by Volodymyr Nosov, an entrepreneur from Kharkiv, Ukraine, and began its trading operations in 2019. In 2021, it launched Whitepay, a service that allows businesses to process payments in cryptocurrency.

After the Russian invasion of Ukraine in February 2022, the exchange blocked users from Russia and Belarus and removed ruble trading pairs, a decision the company said cost it about 30% of its user base at the time. In May 2022, Whitepay was connected to the UNITED24 fundraising platform to enable donations in cryptocurrency.

In August 2022, the company issued its own token, WhiteBIT Token (WBT). In August 2023, it launched a proof-of-authority blockchain, WB Network, which was renamed Whitechain in February 2024 and uses WBT as its native coin. A bitcoin mining pool, WhitePool, followed in August 2024, and in December 2024, WhiteBIT launched WhiteBIT Nova, a debit card for cryptocurrency payments, together with Visa and Wallester.

In 2025, the exchange entered the Australian market, and in November 2025 it signed a cooperation agreement with Durrah AlFodah Holding, a company owned by Saudi prince Naif bin Abdullah bin Saud, on digital infrastructure projects in Saudi Arabia. In January 2026, the Prosecutor General's Office of Russia designated WhiteBIT and W Group "undesirable organisations", which bans their activity in Russia and exposes those who take part in it to prosecution; the authorities cited the company's support for the Ukrainian military. In March 2026, WhiteBIT was admitted to the regulatory sandbox of Ghana's Securities and Exchange Commission to pilot virtual asset services.

== Regulation ==
Through its affiliated companies, WhiteBIT is authorized to provide services related to crypto assets in countries such as Switzerland, Georgia, Turkey, Kazakhstan, Australia, Argentina, and Brazil.

In June 2026, WhiteBIT's European entity, WhiteBIT EU, was authorized as a crypto-asset service provider (CASP) under the EU's Markets in Crypto-Assets Regulation (MiCA).

Audits by the security firm Hacken and its rating service CER.live have ranked the exchange among the most secure by their criteria, and in December 2024 it received Level 3 certification under the Cryptocurrency Security Standard (CCSS).

In May 2026, WhiteBIT launched a separate platform for the United Kingdom, whitebit.uk, with support for the Faster Payments service for GBP deposits and withdrawals.

== Sponsorships ==
WhiteBIT has been a partner of the Ukrainian national football team since 2021, and is a partner of FC Barcelona, and Juventus FC.

== Support for Ukraine ==
Since 2022, WhiteBIT has cooperated with the Ministry of Foreign Affairs of Ukraine on consular to Ukrainian citizens abroad.

In May 2022, the company bought the Eurovision Song Contest 2022 trophy of Kalush Orchestra at a charity auction for $900,000; the proceeds were used to buy drones for the Armed Forces of Ukraine.

In November 2022 the company's founder bought Freddie Mercury's former Rolls-Royce Silver Shadow, consigned by Andriy Danylko, at a Sotheby's charity auction for about £250,000; the proceeds went to the Superhumans rehabilitation centre for wounded Ukrainian soldiers.

In 2023, the company launched a master’s program in blockchain technologies with the National University of Kyiv-Mohyla Academy, and co-developed a free educational program on cryptography together with the Ministry of Digital Transformation of Ukraine and the Filecoin Foundation.

The company has donated to UNITED24 since the platform's launch in May 2022, including $300,000 in its first month, and $271,000 for humanitarian relief after the destruction of the Kakhovka dam in June 2023, and has supported the Shahed Hunter drone-countermeasure project. In 2024 it funded the participation of Ukraine's amputee football team in the European championship. By 2024 the company said it had provided more than €9 million in military and humanitarian aid.

== See also ==
- Blockchain
- Cryptocurrency
- Fintech
- Cryptocurrency exchange
- Digital asset
