= Russian undesirable organizations law =

2015 Russian law

Undesirable organizations law Undesirable NGOs law
- Long title: On Amendments to Legislative Acts of the Russian Federation
- Citation: 129-FZ
- Enacted: 23 May 2015

Legislative history
- Bill title: 662902-6

The Russian undesirable organizations law (officially Federal Law of 23 May 2015 N 129-FZ "On amendments of some legislative acts of the Russian Federation") is a law that was signed by President Vladimir Putin on 23 May 2015 as a follow-up to the 2012 Russian foreign agent law and Dima Yakovlev Law. Under the law, Russian prosecutors are able to target foreign groups which they deem to present "a threat to the foundation of the constitutional order of the Russian Federation, the defense capability of the country or the security of the state."

The law gives prosecutors the power to declare foreign and international organizations "undesirable" in Russia and shut them down. Organizations are subject to heavy fines, while individuals affiliated with them can receive lengthy prison sentences if they fail to dissolve when given notice to do so. These punishments also apply to Russians who maintain ties to them. Supporters of the law claim that this law is vital for the preservation of national security, but critics say that the law is unclear in many areas and can be used to silence dissent. Since the start of the Russian invasion of Ukraine, the Russian government has escalated the use of both the foreign agent and undesirable organizations laws to block the activities of the media, human rights and civil society organisations, most of whom are based in the western world.

== History ==
The proponents revealed that an initial idea of the law was to expand the action of the "foreign agent law" onto foreign noncommercial organizations as well, but after the introduction of economic sanctions against Russia they decided to incorporate economic aspects in the new law as well.

On 23 July 2024 the State Duma adopted a law according to which any organizations can be recognized as undesirable in Russia if their founders or participants are foreign government agencies, in addition to foreign NGOs.

== Implications for NGOs ==
These organisations are forbidden from holding public events and from possessing or distributing promotional materials, including via mass media. All Russian banks and financial institutions are forbidden from cooperating with them and are required to inform Russia's financial watchdog agency about all those that attempt to use them.

When given notice from the prosecutors, these NGOs have to disband. Violators face fines or prison terms of up to six years. People cooperating with such entities are subject to fines and can be banned from entering Russia. Russians who maintain ties with "undesirables" face penalties ranging from fines to a maximum of six years in prison.

== Enforcement ==
On 25 May 2015, the first proposed list of undesirable NGOs was sent to the Prosecutor-General's office was made by an MP from LDPR. The list included the think tank Carnegie Moscow Center, the international history and human rights society Memorial, as well as the Moscow offices of Human Rights Watch and Amnesty International.

On 7 July 2015, RIA Novosti published an alleged shortlist by the Federal Council of Russia of organizations to be branded undesirable. Those include the US-based Open Society Institute, the National Endowment for Democracy, the MacArthur Foundation and the Charles Stewart Mott Foundation. The list also includes the Polish-based Education for Democracy foundation and the East European Democratic Centre as well as three Ukrainian organizations: The Ukrainian World Congress, the Ukrainian World Coordinating Council and the Crimean Field Mission on Human Rights.

After the Federal Council's vote to include the MacArthur Foundation on the recommended list of "undesirable organizations", it announced the closing of its Russian division, operating since 1992.

In July 2015, the National Endowment for Democracy became the first organization to be officially blacklisted by the Russian authorities under the law. The decision by the Office of the Prosecutor General of the Russian Federation was announced on its website where it was claimed that NED's activities "pose a threat to constitutional order of the Russian Federation, defense potential and security of the state". Among NED's alleged violations were its donations to commercial and non-profit organizations that independently monitor elections, as well as for undefined "political activities" and "discrediting service in the [Russian] armed forces".

In November 2015, two branches of George Soros' charity network, the Open Society Foundations and the Open Society Institute Assistance Foundation, were banned under this law in Russia. The infractions were not listed, but the Office of the Prosecutor General of the Russian Federation released a statement stating that "the activity of the Open Society Foundations and the Open Society Institute Assistance Foundation represents a threat to the foundations of the constitutional system of the Russian Federation and the security of the state".

Ahead of the March 2018 presidential election, two European organizations involved in election monitoring were added.

== Affected organizations ==
As of 20 November 2026, the Ministry of Justice of the Russian Federation has designated 442 foreign and international organizations as "undesirable" in Russia (including the occupied territories of Ukraine). The majority of these organizations are based in the United States, Germany, the United Kingdom and Ukraine.

List of organizations affected by the Russian undesirable organizations law
№	Name of organization	Country	Ministry of Justice’s order date	Prosecutor- General’s decision date	Reference
1	National Endowment for Democracy	United States	29 July 2015	28 July 2015	
2	Open Society Institute Assistance Foundation	United States	1 December 2015	26 November 2015	
3	Open Society Foundations	United States	1 December 2015	26 November 2015	
4	U.S. Russia Foundation	United States	7 December 2015	3 December 2015	
5	National Democratic Institute	United States	17 March 2016	10 March 2016	
6	Media Development Investment Fund	United States	22 August 2016	18 August 2016	
7	International Republican Institute	United States	22 August 2016	18 August 2016	
8	Open Russia Civic Movement	United Kingdom	27 April 2017	26 April 2017	
9	Open Russia	United Kingdom	27 April 2017	26 April 2017	
10	Institute of Modern Russia	United States	27 April 2017	26 April 2017	
11	Black Sea Trust for Regional Cooperation	Romania	3 July 2017	30 June 2017	
12	European Platform for Democratic Elections	Germany	13 March 2018	12 March 2018	
13	International Elections Study Center	Lithuania	13 March 2018	12 March 2018	
14	German Marshall Fund	United States	21 March 2018	20 March 2018	
15	Pacific Environment	United States	28 August 2018	24 August 2018	
16	Free Russia Foundation	United States	28 June 2019	27 June 2019	
17	Ukrainian World Congress	Canada	17 July 2019	11 July 2019	
18	Atlantic Council	United States	29 July 2019	25 July 2019	
19	People in Need	Czech Republic	12 November 2019	7 November 2019	
20	European Endowment for Democracy	Belgium	12 March 2020	6 March 2020	
21	Jamestown Foundation	United States	9 April 2020	8 April 2020	
22	PH International	United States	23 April 2020	22 April 2020	
23	Dragon Springs	United States	21 July 2020	17 July 2020	
24	Doctors Against Forced Organ Harvesting	United States	21 July 2020	17 July 2020	
25	European Falun Dafa Association	United Kingdom	21 July 2020	17 July 2020	
26	Friends of Falun Gong	United States	21 July 2020	17 July 2020	
27	Global Mission to Rescue Persecuted Falun Gong Practitioners	United States	21 July 2020	17 July 2020	
28	Coalition to Investigate the Persecution of Falun Gong	United States	21 July 2020	17 July 2020	
29	World Organisation to Investigate the Persecution of Falun Gong	United States	21 July 2020	17 July 2020	
30	Prague Civil Society Centre	Czech Republic	25 December 2020	17 December 2020	
31	Association of Schools of Political Studies of the Council of Europe	France	25 December 2020	22 December 2020	
32	Center for Liberal Modernity	Germany	2 June 2021	26 May 2021	
33	Forum of Russian-speaking Europeans	Germany	2 June 2021	26 May 2021	
34	Austausch	Germany	2 June 2021	26 May 2021	
35	Bard College	United States	30 June 2021	21 June 2021	
36	European Choice	France	9 July 2021	30 June 2021	
37	Khodorkovsky Foundation	United Kingdom	9 July 2021	30 June 2021	
38	Oxford Russia Fund	United Kingdom	9 July 2021	30 June 2021	
39	Future of Russia Foundation	United Kingdom	9 July 2021	30 June 2021	
40	Society for Freedom of Information (Team 29)	Czech Republic	9 July 2021	29 June 2021	
41	Proekt	United States	23 July 2021	15 July 2021	
42	International Partnership for Human Rights	Belgium	17 August 2021	12 August 2021	
43	New Generation Spiritual Directorate of the Evangelical Christian	Ukraine	30 August 2021	23 August 2021	
44	New Generation Evangelical Christian Church	Latvia	30 August 2021	23 August 2021	
45	New Generation International Biblical College	Ukraine	30 August 2021	23 August 2021	
46	New Generation International Christian Movement	Latvia	30 August 2021	23 August 2021	
47	World Institute of Scientology Enterprises	United States	1 October 2021	24 September 2021	
48	Church of Spiritual Technology	United States	1 October 2021	24 September 2021	
49	European Network of Election Monitoring Organizations	Montenegro	1 October 2021	27 September 2021	
50	WOT Foundation	Poland	4 February 2022	25 January 2022	
51	Free Idel-Ural	Ukraine	28 February 2022	16 February 2022	
52	Journalism Development Network (OCCRP)	United States	5 March 2022	22 February 2022	
53	Important Stories	Latvia	5 March 2022	22 February 2022	
54	Chatham House	United Kingdom	13 April 2022	7 April 2022	
55	Crimean Human Rights Group	Ukraine	13 May 2022	4 May 2022	
56	Heinrich Böll Foundation	Germany	31 May 2022	20 May 2022	
57	Bellingcat	Netherlands	26 July 2022	13 July 2022	
58	Bellingcat	United Kingdom	26 July 2022	13 July 2022	
59	The Insider	Latvia	26 July 2022	13 July 2022	
60	CEELI Institute	Czech Republic	26 July 2022	13 July 2022	
61	Open Estonia Foundation	Estonia	29 July 2022	19 July 2022	
62	Calvert 22 Foundation	United Kingdom	12 August 2022	29 July 2022	
63	Ukrainian Canadian Congress	Canada	19 August 2022	4 August 2022	
64	Macdonald–Laurier Institute	Canada	19 August 2022	4 August 2022	
65	Ukrainian National Federation of Canada	Canada	19 August 2022	4 August 2022	
66	Dekabristen	Germany	25 October 2022	12 October 2022	
67	Wilson Center	United States	25 November 2022	10 November 2022	
68	Open Press	France	25 November 2022	11 November 2022	
69	Volodymyr Muntyan Renaissance Charity Foundation	Ukraine	25 November 2022	16 November 2022	
70	Renaissance Spiritual Center	Ukraine	25 November 2022	16 November 2022	
71	Riddle	Lithuania	13 December 2022	25 November 2022	
72	Anti-War Committee in Sweden «Russians Against War»	Sweden	10 January 2023	20 December 2022	
73	Meduza	Latvia	7 February 2023	25 January 2023	
74	Andrei Sakharov Foundation	United States	7 February 2023	23 January 2023	
75	Free Russia Forum	Lithuania	13 February 2023	30 January 2023	
76	Free Nations League	Lithuania	10 March 2023	17 February 2023	
77	Transparency International	Germany	21 March 2023	3 March 2023	
78	Free Nations of Post-Russia Forum	Poland	31 March 2023	15 March 2023	
79	Solidarus	Germany	5 April 2023	15 March 2023	
80	CrimeaSOS	Ukraine	5 April 2023	21 March 2023	
81	Free University	Latvia	18 April 2023	30 March 2023	
82	Institute for Statecraft	United Kingdom	25 April 2023	20 March 2023	
83	Civil Society Forum	Germany	25 April 2023	10 April 2023	
84	Bellona Foundation	Norway	2 May 2023	17 April 2023	
85	League of Residents of Chishima and Habomai Islands	Japan	11 May 2023	20 April 2023	
86	Congress of People's Deputies	Poland	18 May 2023	27 April 2023	
87	Greenpeace	Netherlands	29 May 2023	18 May 2023	
88	Anti-Corruption Foundation	United States	1 June 2023	22 May 2023	
89	Transformation Center (Church International, Covenant Network)	United States	27 June 2023	7 June 2023	
90	Agora	Bulgaria	28 June 2023	14 June 2023	
91	World Wildlife Fund	Switzerland	5 July 2023	20 June 2023	
92	Novaya Gazeta Europe	Latvia	14 July 2023	26 June 2023	
93	Altai Project	United States	17 July 2023	3 July 2023	
94	Educational Human Rights House Chernihiv	Ukraine	24 July 2023	5 July 2023	
95	Human Rights House Foundation	Norway	24 July 2023	5 July 2023	
96	Barys Zvozskau Belarusian Human Rights House	Lithuania	24 July 2023	5 July 2023	
97	Human Rights House Tbilisi	Georgia	24 July 2023	5 July 2023	
98	Human Rights House Yerevan	Armenia	24 July 2023	5 July 2023	
99	Human Rights House Crimea	Ukraine	24 July 2023	5 July 2023	
100	Wild Salmon Center	United States	2 August 2023	17 July 2023	
101	TVR Studios (TV Rain)	Netherlands	4 August 2023	21 July 2023	
102	TV Rain	Latvia	4 August 2023	21 July 2023	
103	Wilfried Martens Centre for European Studies	Belgium	15 August 2023	28 July 2023	
104	Conflict Intelligence Team	Georgia	18 August 2023	4 August 2023	
105	AllatRa	Ukraine	18 August 2023	2 August 2023	
106	For a Free Russia	Poland	23 August 2023	11 August 2023	
107	Free Buryatia Foundation	United States	12 September 2023	30 August 2023	
108	URALIC Centre for Indigenous Peoples	Estonia	14 September 2023	30 August 2023	
109	unKremlin	Germany	18 September 2023	1 September 2023	
110	International Transport Workers' Federation	United Kingdom	18 September 2023	1 September 2023	
111	EastCham Finland	Finland	26 September 2023	12 September 2023	
112	Hudson Institute	United States	26 September 2023	13 September 2023	
113	Foundation for Democratic Development	United States	11 October 2023	18 September 2023	
114	Committee-2024	Poland	17 October 2023	26 September 2023	
115	Central European University	Austria	1 November 2023	18 September 2023	
116	Centre for East European and International Studies	Germany	1 November 2023	12 September 2023	
117	Watch Tower Bible and Tract Society of Jehovah's Witnesses	Germany	8 November 2023	12 October 2023	
118	Religious Center of Jehovah's Witnesses in Ukraine	Ukraine	8 November 2023	12 October 2023	
119	Watch Tower Bible and Tract Society of Pennsylvania	United States	8 November 2023	12 October 2023	
120	Civic Council	Poland	21 November 2023	3 November 2023	
121	Center for European Policy Analysis	United States	27 November 2023	23 October 2023	
122	Academic Network Eastern Europe	Germany	4 December 2023	14 November 2023	
123	Russian Action Committee	Lithuania	4 December 2023	14 November 2023	
124	RAND Corporation	United States	6 December 2023	21 November 2023	
125	Russian America for Democracy in Russia	United States	25 December 2023	24 November 2023	
126	True Russia	United Kingdom	25 December 2023	7 December 2023	
127	Global Investigative Journalism Network	United States	25 December 2023	5 December 2023	
128	Helpdesk Media Foundation	Latvia	26 December 2023	11 December 2023	
129	Freies Russland Berlin	Germany	26 January 2024	26 December 2023	
130	Freies Russland NRW	Germany	26 January 2024	26 December 2023	
131	GlobalGiving	United States	26 January 2024	11 January 2024	
132	Anti-War Committee of Russia	—	31 January 2024	11 January 2024	
133	Russie-Libertés	France	31 January 2024	11 January 2024	
134	Association of Free Russians	Spain	31 January 2024	11 January 2024	
135	Alliance for the Return of the Northern Territories	Japan	5 February 2024	23 January 2024	
136	Crimean Tatar Resource Center	Ukraine	5 February 2024	16 January 2024	
137	IndustriALL Global Union	Switzerland	5 February 2024	17 January 2024	
138	Russian Election Monitor	Germany	7 February 2024	19 January 2024	
139	Article 19	United Kingdom	8 February 2024	23 January 2024	
140	Mnenie Media (Doxa)	Czech Republic	8 February 2024	15 January 2024	
141	Anarchist Black Cross Federation	United States	16 February 2024	25 January 2024	
142	Radio Free Europe/Radio Liberty	United States	20 February 2024	2 February 2024	
143	German Association for East European Studies	Germany	1 March 2024	14 February 2024	
144	Friedrich Ebert Foundation	Germany	1 March 2024	14 February 2024	
145	XZ Foundation	Germany	1 March 2024	14 February 2024	
146	OWEN — Mobile Academy for Gender Democracy and Peacebuilding	Germany	1 March 2024	14 February 2024	
147	Lev Kopelev Forum	Germany	13 March 2024	19 February 2024	
148	American Councils for International Education	United States	18 March 2024	26 February 2024	
149	Cultural Vistas	United States	18 March 2024	26 February 2024	
150	Institute of International Education	United States	18 March 2024	26 February 2024	
151	Russians Against War Antalya	Turkey	18 March 2024	27 February 2024	
152	Open Dialogue Foundation	Poland	25 March 2024	14 February 2024	
153	Munk School of Global Affairs & Public Policy	Canada	2 April 2024	13 March 2024	
154	Russian Canadian Democratic Alliance	Canada	2 April 2024	13 March 2024	
155	Norman Paterson School of International Affairs	Canada	2 April 2024	13 March 2024	
156	Center for Civil Liberties	Ukraine	16 April 2024	29 March 2024	
157	Boris Nemtsov Foundation for Freedom	Germany	16 April 2024	13 March 2024	
158	Friedrich Naumann Foundation for Freedom	Germany	16 April 2024	13 March 2024	
159	Feminist Anti-War Resistance	—	25 April 2024	9 April 2024	
160	Ingush Independence Committee	Turkey	2 May 2024	11 April 2024	
161	Prometheus Security Environment Research Center	Ukraine	15 May 2024	24 April 2024	
162	KKL-Stop the Occupation of Karelia	Estonia	17 May 2024	25 April 2024	
163	Come Back Alive	Ukraine	17 May 2024	24 April 2024	
164	Freedom House	United States	21 May 2024	6 May 2024	
165	Sotaproject	Lithuania	24 May 2024	7 May 2024	
166	Liberal Democratic League of Ukraine	Ukraine	3 June 2024	13 May 2024	
167	German Historical Institute Moscow	Germany	14 June 2024	30 May 2024	
168	Great Commission Media Ministries	Canada	21 June 2024	3 June 2024	
169	International Russian Radio & Television	Finland	21 June 2024	3 June 2024	
170	Great Commission Media Ministries	United States	21 June 2024	3 June 2024	
171	Dekoder	Germany	1 July 2024	30 May 2024	
172	Center for Strategic and International Studies	United States	1 July 2024	11 June 2024	
173	Democratic Community of Russian-speakers in Finland	Finland	8 July 2024	20 June 2024	
174	Vuoksi Ry	Finland	8 July 2024	20 June 2024	
175	MitOst	Germany	10 July 2024	20 June 2024	
176	John Smith Trust	United Kingdom	10 July 2024	26 June 2024	
177	The Moscow Times	Netherlands	17 July 2024	3 July 2024	
178	Carnegie Endowment for International Peace	United States	18 July 2024	1 July 2024	
179	Assembly of the Peoples of the Caucasus	France	2 August 2024	16 July 2024	
180	EF Education First	Switzerland	5 August 2024	16 July 2024	
181	OSTMOST Foundation	Poland	5 August 2024	16 July 2024	
182	Konrad Adenauer Foundation	Germany	14 August 2024	31 July 2024	
183	Kulturus	Czech Republic	14 August 2024	30 July 2024	
184	MRR-Fund (My Russian Rights)	Germany	14 August 2024	30 July 2024	
185	Russia Behind Bars	Germany	14 August 2024	30 July 2024	
186	For Your and Our Freedom	Czech Republic	14 August 2024	30 July 2024	
187	Deputies of Peaceful Russia	Germany	27 August 2024	13 August 2024	
188	Clooney Foundation for Justice	United States	27 August 2024	14 August 2024	
189	Belsat	Poland	1 October 2024	11 September 2024	
190	Humanitarian Fund 24/02	Ukraine	4 October 2024	18 September 2024	
191	Media in Cooperation and Transition	Germany	30 October 2024	7 October 2024	
192	International Association of Intellectual Games	Liechtenstein	14 November 2024	30 October 2024	
193	YPO	United States	14 November 2024	30 October 2024	
194	Human Rights Centre ZMINA	Ukraine	20 November 2024	6 November 2024	
195	The Satanic Temple	United States	19 December 2024	29 November 2024	
196	Recorded Future	United States	9 January 2025	16 December 2024	
197	Canadian Center for Development of Democracy in Russia	Canada	10 January 2025	17 December 2024	
198	Commission on Security and Cooperation in Europe	United States	17 January 2025	16 December 2024	
199	Help Heroes of Ukraine	United States	17 January 2025	20 December 2024	
200	International Religious Freedom or Belief Alliance	United States	17 January 2025	25 December 2024	
201	OpenText	Canada	30 January 2025	9 January 2025	
202	Independent Institute of Philosophy	France	30 January 2025	20 January 2025	
203	Journalists in Need Network	Germany	30 January 2025	25 December 2024	
204	Compelson	Czech Republic	30 January 2025	9 January 2025	
205	Register of Damage for Ukraine	Netherlands	7 February 2025	22 January 2025	
206	The Barents Observer	Norway	18 February 2025	4 February 2025	
207	Association of Free Russians	Portugal	3 March 2025	7 February 2025	
208	Russian Democratic Society	Serbia	5 March 2025	19 February 2025	
209	Alliance of Liberals and Democrats for Europe Party	Belgium	17 March 2025	24 February 2025	
210	European Liberal Youth	Belgium	17 March 2025	24 February 2025	
211	Rasmussen Global	Denmark	24 March 2025	5 March 2025	
212	Association for the Development of Russian Civil Society and Support of Russian Emigrants	Latvia	24 March 2025	26 February 2025	
213	For Ukraine, for Their Freedom and Ours!	France	26 March 2025	5 March 2025	
214	European Leadership Network	United Kingdom	1 April 2025	10 March 2025	
215	German Council on Foreign Relations	Germany	1 April 2025	5 March 2025	
216	Elton John AIDS Foundation	United Kingdom	14 April 2025	21 March 2025	
217	Justice for Journalists	United Kingdom	14 April 2025	21 March 2025	
218	Elton John AIDS Foundation	United States	14 April 2025	21 March 2025	
219	Hanns Seidel Foundation	Germany	18 April 2025	21 March 2025	
220	Northern Territories Issue Association	Japan	18 April 2025	3 April 2025	
221	Hope Harbor Society	United States	22 April 2025	31 March 2025	
222	Community of Free Russians	Italy	7 May 2025	10 April 2025	
223	International Indigenous Fund for Development and Solidarity Batani	United States	14 May 2025	11 April 2025	
224	Association of Investigative Journalists — Fund 19/29	Czech Republic	22 May 2025	11 April 2025	
225	Association «Polish Community»	Poland	22 May 2025	21 April 2025	
226	Amnesty International	United Kingdom	28 May 2025	12 May 2025	
227	Eurasian Coalition on Health, Rights, Gender and Sexual Diversity	Estonia	28 May 2025	12 May 2025	
228	Brigham Young University	United States	2 June 2025	29 April 2025	
229	Körber Foundation	Germany	2 June 2025	29 April 2025	
230	Association for Slavic, East European, and Eurasian Studies	United States	3 June 2025	12 May 2025	
231	Radio Echo	Germany	3 June 2025	12 May 2025	
232	Institute for Human Sciences	Austria	3 June 2025	12 May 2025	
233	NoWar Human Rights Movement	Mongolia	11 June 2025	12 May 2025	
234	British Council	United Kingdom	11 June 2025	26 May 2025	
235	Global Network of Sex Work Projects	United Kingdom	19 June 2025	30 May 2025	
236	Democratic Community of Russians in Cyprus	Cyprus	19 June 2025	30 May 2025	
237	Razom	United States	24 June 2025	9 June 2025	
238	Sex Workers' Rights Advocacy Network	Hungary	24 June 2025	3 June 2025	
239	Eurasian Harm Reduction Association	Lithuania	2 July 2025	16 June 2025	
240	European Resilience Initiative Centre	Germany	2 July 2025	11 June 2025	
241	Norwegian Helsinki Committee	Norway	11 July 2025	24 June 2025	
242	Yale University	United States	11 July 2025	23 June 2025	
243	Army SOS	Ukraine	11 July 2025	23 June 2025	
244	Civil Network Community «Peace. Progress. Human Rights»	—	22 July 2025	1 July 2025	
245	Andrei Sakharov Institute	France	22 July 2025	1 July 2025	
246	Robert Carr Fund	Netherlands	1 August 2025	4 July 2025	
247	East View Information Services	United States	4 August 2025	4 July 2025	
248	n-ost	Germany	4 August 2025	4 July 2025	
249	Rosa Luxemburg Foundation	Germany	4 August 2025	15 July 2025	
250	International House World Organisation	United Kingdom	7 August 2025	16 July 2025	
251	UnMode — Community Movement for Access to Justice	Georgia	7 August 2025	21 July 2025	
252	Helsińska Fundacja Praw Człowieka	Poland	11 August 2025	25 July 2025	
253	Group 36	United States	14 August 2025	25 July 2025	
254	Reporters Without Borders	France	14 August 2025	23 July 2025	
255	Foundation Remembrance, Responsibility and Future	Germany	18 August 2025	1 August 2025	
256	Zimin Foundation	United Kingdom	18 August 2025	30 July 2025	
257	Netherlands Helsinki Committee	Netherlands	18 August 2025	1 August 2025	
258	Demokrati-JA	Germany	21 August 2025	6 August 2025	
259	ProtectDefenders.eu	Belgium	26 August 2025	6 August 2025	
260	Civic Solidarity Platform	—	26 August 2025	6 August 2025	
261	Human Rights Funders Network	United States	4 September 2025	13 August 2025	
262	Royal United Services Institute	United Kingdom	4 September 2025	8 August 2025	
263	International Baccalaureate	Switzerland	4 September 2025	15 August 2025	
264	Friede Allen	Germany	16 September 2025	15 August 2025	
265	AFS Intercultural Programs	United States	25 September 2025	9 September 2025	
266	Initiative for Resistance and Dialogues	Finland	1 October 2025	9 September 2025	
267	Eurasian Network of People Who Use Drugs	Georgia	1 October 2025	8 September 2025	
268	Bart-Marsho	France	2 October 2025	17 September 2025	
269	Assembly of Chechens of Europe	France	2 October 2025	17 September 2025	
270	Correctiv	Germany	8 October 2025	16 September 2025	
271	International Center for Journalists	United States	30 October 2025	17 September 2025	
272	Truth Hounds	Ukraine	30 October 2025	16 September 2025	
273	Ideas for Change	Ukraine	30 October 2025	17 September 2025	
274	JX Fund	Germany	30 October 2025	17 September 2025	
275	Nordic Council of Ministers	Denmark	7 November 2025	24 October 2025	
276	Equal Rights Trust	United Kingdom	13 November 2025	1 November 2025	
277	Free Peoples of Russia House	United States	24 November 2025	10 November 2025	
278	Organized Crime and Corruption Reporting Project	Netherlands	24 November 2025	7 November 2025	
279	Human Rights Watch	United States	28 November 2025	10 November 2025	
280	GSC Game World	Ukraine	28 November 2025	13 November 2025	
281	International Federation for Human Rights	France	1 December 2025	13 November 2025	
282	Kharkiv Human Rights Protection Group	Ukraine	2 December 2025	19 November 2025	
283	Turkic Revival Front	Turkey	4 December 2025	19 November 2025	
284	İMKANDER	Turkey	4 December 2025	24 November 2025	
285	Civic Council Support Foundation	Poland	4 December 2025	21 November 2025	
286	Alliance for a Free and Democratic Russia	Germany	15 December 2025	1 December 2025	
287	Nature and Youth	Norway	15 December 2025	2 December 2025	
288	For Free Russia	Bulgaria	15 December 2025	1 December 2025	
289	House of Ingria	Estonia	15 December 2025	1 December 2025	
290	Deutsche Welle	Germany	15 December 2025	1 December 2025	
291	Justice Initiative	Netherlands	18 December 2025	2 December 2025	
292	Rubikus	Germany	29 December 2025	16 December 2025	
293	Russian-speaking Democrats	Germany	29 December 2025	16 December 2025	
294	Action4life	Lithuania	29 December 2025	16 December 2025	
295	Nordic Ukraine Forum	Sweden	29 December 2025	17 December 2025	
296	LexCollective	United States	29 December 2025	15 December 2025	
297	Oak Foundation	Switzerland	12 January 2026	18 December 2025	
298	SupportNet	Estonia	12 January 2026	17 December 2025	
299	Casimir Pulaski Foundation	Poland	12 January 2026	17 December 2025	
300	Stefan Batory Foundation	Poland	12 January 2026	17 December 2025	
301	TRIAL International	Switzerland	12 January 2026	17 December 2025	
302	Institute for Global Reconstitution	Germany	12 January 2026	17 December 2025	
303	Samogłoska Foundation	Poland	12 January 2026	17 December 2025	
304	Freedom and Democracy Foundation	Poland	12 January 2026	16 December 2025	
305	International Lesbian, Gay, Bisexual, Trans and Intersex Association	Switzerland	19 January 2026	24 December 2025	
306	B4Ukraine Foundation	Netherlands	19 January 2026	22 December 2025	
307	SAB UA	Estonia	19 January 2026	22 December 2025	
308	George Washington University	United States	19 January 2026	24 December 2025	
309	Lemkin Institute for Genocide Prevention	United States	19 January 2026	24 December 2025	
310	RUHelp	Luxembourg	19 January 2026	22 December 2025	
311	Artec 3D	Luxembourg	19 January 2026	22 December 2025	
312	Centre for Peacebuilding and Community Development	United Kingdom	19 January 2026	25 December 2025	
313	Human Rights First	United States	19 January 2026	22 December 2025	
314	International Alliance of Libertarian Parties	Switzerland	26 January 2026	12 January 2026	
315	Kafkas Vakfı	Turkey	26 January 2026	12 January 2026	
316	Parliamentary Centre	Canada	26 January 2026	12 January 2026	
317	VIGO Law Firm	France	26 January 2026	13 January 2026	
318	Canada Fund for Local Initiatives	Canada	26 January 2026	13 January 2026	
319	WhiteBIT	Lithuania	30 January 2026	19 January 2026	
320	W Group	—	30 January 2026	19 January 2026	
321	Regional Center for Human Rights	Ukraine	30 January 2026	19 January 2026	
322	International Women's Media Foundation	United States	30 January 2026	19 January 2026	
323	AVSI	Italy	4 February 2026	22 January 2026	
324	Ukrainian Legal Advisory Group	Ukraine	4 February 2026	20 January 2026	
325	Crude Accountability Incorporated	United States	4 February 2026	19 January 2026	
326	German Academic Exchange Service	Germany	9 February 2026	23 January 2026	
327	Federal Association of Russian-speaking Parents	Germany	9 February 2026	29 January 2026	
328	RISE Moldova	Moldova	9 February 2026	29 January 2026	
329	Chronicles Media	Lithuania	9 February 2026	29 January 2026	
330	Henry Jackson Society	United Kingdom	16 February 2026	9 February 2026	
331	Japan International Cooperation Agency	Japan	16 February 2026	9 February 2026	
332	Zukunft Memorial	Germany	16 February 2026	9 February 2026	
333	Arctida	Georgia	16 February 2026	9 February 2026	
334	Civic IDEA	Georgia	16 February 2026	3 February 2026	
335	International Memorial Association	Switzerland	16 February 2026	9 February 2026	
336	Center for Independent Social Research	Germany	26 February 2026	13 February 2026	
337	European Prison Litigation Network	France	26 February 2026	13 February 2026	
338	Russian-speaking Academic Science Association	United States	2 March 2026	17 February 2026	
339	University of California, Berkeley	United States	2 March 2026	16 February 2026	
340	Norwegian Barents Secretariat	Norway	6 March 2026	25 February 2026	
341	Fletcher School of Law and Diplomacy	United States	26 March 2026	16 March 2026	
342	Tufts University	United States	26 March 2026	16 March 2026	
343	International Commission of Jurists	Switzerland	1 April 2026	19 March 2026	
344	Center for Russian, East European and Eurasian Studies	United States	7 April 2026	26 March 2026	
345	Stanford University	United States	7 April 2026	26 March 2026	
346	Crisis Simulation for Peace	Germany	7 April 2026	24 March 2026	
347	Eurasianet	United States	14 April 2026	2 April 2026	
348	Future Russia — Switzerland	Switzerland	14 April 2026	31 March 2026	
349	Next Level Initiatives	Netherlands	14 April 2026	2 April 2026	
350	Media Initiative for Human Rights	Ukraine	27 April 2026	14 April 2026	
351	European Youth Forum	Belgium	27 April 2026	14 April 2026	
352	World Organisation Against Torture	Switzerland	5 May 2026	17 April 2026	
353	International Association of Russian Advocates	France	12 May 2026	27 April 2026	
354	Committee to Protect Journalists	United States	12 May 2026	28 April 2026	
355	Mission Eurasia	United States	13 May 2026	30 April 2026	
356	Landsmannschaft Ostpreußen	Germany	21 May 2026	12 May 2026	
357	R.T. Weatherman Foundation	United States	28 May 2026	18 May 2026	
358	Harvard Ukrainian Research Institute	United States	19 June 2026	8 June 2026	
359	Davis Center for Russian and Eurasian Studies	United States	19 June 2026	8 June 2026	
360	Harvard Kennedy School	United States	19 June 2026	8 June 2026	
361	Center for Independent Social Research	United States	19 June 2026	8 June 2026	
362	Newsader Foundation	Lithuania	30 June 2026	16 June 2026	
363	Baltic Centre for Media Excellence	Latvia	3 July 2026	22 June 2026	
364	Global Rights Compliance	Netherlands	3 July 2026	23 June 2026	
365	Çeçen Kafkas Muhacirleri Yardımlaşma ve Dayanışma Derneği	Turkey	3 July 2026	22 June 2026	
366	Helpdesk Media	Germany	3 July 2026	23 June 2026	
367	American Coalition for Ukraine	United States	3 July 2026	23 June 2026	
368	Arctic, Remote, and Cold Territories Interdisciplinary Center	United States	13 July 2026	30 June 2026	
369	Schweizerische Akademische Gesellschaft für Osteuropawissenschaften	Switzerland	13 July 2026	30 June 2026	
370	Movement for Defence of Voters' Rights «Golos»	—	13 July 2026	30 June 2026	
371	Child Evangelism Fellowship	United States	16 July 2026	6 July 2026	
372	Karelian Cultural Society	Finland	16 July 2026	2 July 2026	
373	International Drug Policy Consortium	United Kingdom	24 July 2026	16 July 2026	
374	Platform of Civic, Anti-War and Humanitarian Initiatives	Germany	24 July 2026	13 July 2026	
375	Ukrainian Freedom Convoys	Norway	24 July 2026	13 July 2026	
376	Robert Bosch Stiftung	Germany	24 July 2026	13 July 2026	
377	Nova Ukraine	United States	24 July 2026	13 July 2026	
378	Geradeaus (StraightForward Foundation)	Germany	24 July 2026	13 July 2026	
379	Reforum Space Paris	France	24 July 2026	13 July 2026	
380	Eastern European Network for Citizenship Education	Germany	24 July 2026	13 July 2026	
381	SmåRådina: for democracy in Russia	Norway	24 July 2026	13 July 2026	
382	Liberty Forward	United States	24 July 2026	13 July 2026	
383	Dalan Fund	Netherlands	4 August 2026	23 July 2026	
384	Crimean Tatar Foundation	United States	4 August 2026	23 July 2026	
385	Human Rights Foundation	United States	11 August 2026	29 July 2026	
386	Russians Batumi	Georgia	14 August 2026	3 August 2026	
387	Victims of Communism Memorial Foundation	United States	14 August 2026	3 August 2026	
388	Research Centre for East European Studies	Germany	14 August 2026	4 August 2026	
389	Associazione dei Russi Liberi	Italy	14 August 2026	3 August 2026	
390	The Remembrance Society	United States	14 August 2026	4 August 2026	
391	Don Republican Movement	France	19 August 2026	5 August 2026	
392	Pikene på Broen	Norway	28 August 2026	18 August 2026	
393	Faculty of Liberal Arts & Sciences	Montenegro	28 August 2026	17 August 2026	
394	Central Asian Bureau for Analytical Reporting	Kazakhstan	8 September 2026	24 August 2026	
395	Razom We Stand	Netherlands	8 September 2026	24 August 2026	
396	Razom We Stand	Ukraine	8 September 2026	24 August 2026	
397	Institute for War & Peace Reporting	United Kingdom	8 September 2026	24 August 2026	
398	OSINT for Ukraine	Netherlands	8 September 2026	25 August 2026	
399	Dialogue for Understanding	Germany	8 September 2026	25 August 2026	
400	PANDA platforma	Germany	8 September 2026	25 August 2026	
401	Institute for War & Peace Reporting	Netherlands	8 September 2026	24 August 2026	
402	U.S. Ukrainian Activists	United States	8 September 2026	25 August 2026	
403	Gardar Venture Capital Fund	Norway	8 September 2026	25 August 2026	
404	Stiftung Menschenrechte	Germany	8 September 2026	25 August 2026	
405	Ukrainian War Environmental Consequences Work Group	Ukraine	8 September 2026	25 August 2026	
406	INFO OPS Polska Foundation	Poland	8 September 2026	25 August 2026	
407	Institute for War & Peace Reporting	United States	8 September 2026	24 August 2026	
408	Institute for War & Peace Reporting	Ireland	8 September 2026	24 August 2026	
409	The Epoch Times	United States	11 September 2026	31 August 2026	
410	Russian Democratic Society	United Kingdom	11 September 2026	28 August 2026	
411	Democracy Reporting International	Germany	11 September 2026	28 August 2026	
412	Smolny Beyond Borders	Germany	11 September 2026	28 August 2026	
413	International Research & Exchanges Board	United States	11 September 2026	28 August 2026	
414	Foundation for Democracy and Liberal Values	United States	11 September 2026	26 August 2026	
415	Quarteera	Germany	11 September 2026	28 August 2026	
416	Friends of Falun Gong Europe	Ireland	22 September 2026	7 September 2026	
417	Centre of civil education «Almenda»	Ukraine	22 September 2026	9 September 2026	
418	Stiftung Verbundenheit mit den Deutschen im Ausland	Germany	22 September 2026	7 September 2026	
419	EK Strategic Communications Center	Estonia	2 October 2026	21 September 2026	
420	Volna with Ukraine to victory and prosperity	Estonia	9 October 2026	28 September 2026	
421	Moldova-Institut Leipzig	Germany	14 October 2026	29 September 2026	
422	Frame	Georgia	14 October 2026	29 September 2026	
423	Raam op Rusland	Netherlands	14 October 2026	29 September 2026	
424	Suomi-Ukraina Maanpuolustusyhdistys	Finland	26 October 2026	9 October 2026	
425	Family Federation for World Peace and Unification	South Korea	26 October 2026	12 October 2026	
426	Universal Peace Federation	United States	29 October 2026	20 October 2026	
427	Women's Federation for World Peace	United States	29 October 2026	20 October 2026	
428	Institute for Peace Research and Security Policy at the University of Hamburg	Germany	29 October 2026	20 October 2026	
429	United Help Ukraine	United States	29 October 2026	20 October 2026	
430	Anti-War Pastoral Initiative	Estonia	29 October 2026	20 October 2026	
431	Vidim Books	Slovakia	29 October 2026	20 October 2026	
432	Ingushian Culture Center of Tbilisi	Georgia	29 October 2026	20 October 2026	
433	SICH Human Rights Group	Ukraine	29 October 2026	20 October 2026	
434	Senate Square Society	United States	29 October 2026	19 October 2026	
435	PACE Platform for Dialogue with Russian Democratic Forces	France	29 October 2026	21 October 2026	
436	Reforum Space Tallinn	Estonia	5 November 2026	22 October 2026	
437	Reforum Space Tbilisi	Georgia	5 November 2026	22 October 2026	
438	Reforum Space Vilnius	Lithuania	5 November 2026	22 October 2026	
439	Reforum Space Berlin	Germany	5 November 2026	22 October 2026	
440	Droa	Georgia	13 November 2026	30 October 2026	
441	Kettering Foundation	United States	13 November 2026	3 November 2026	
442	Eurovision Mission to Europe	United Kingdom	19 November 2026	10 November 2026	

== Reactions ==
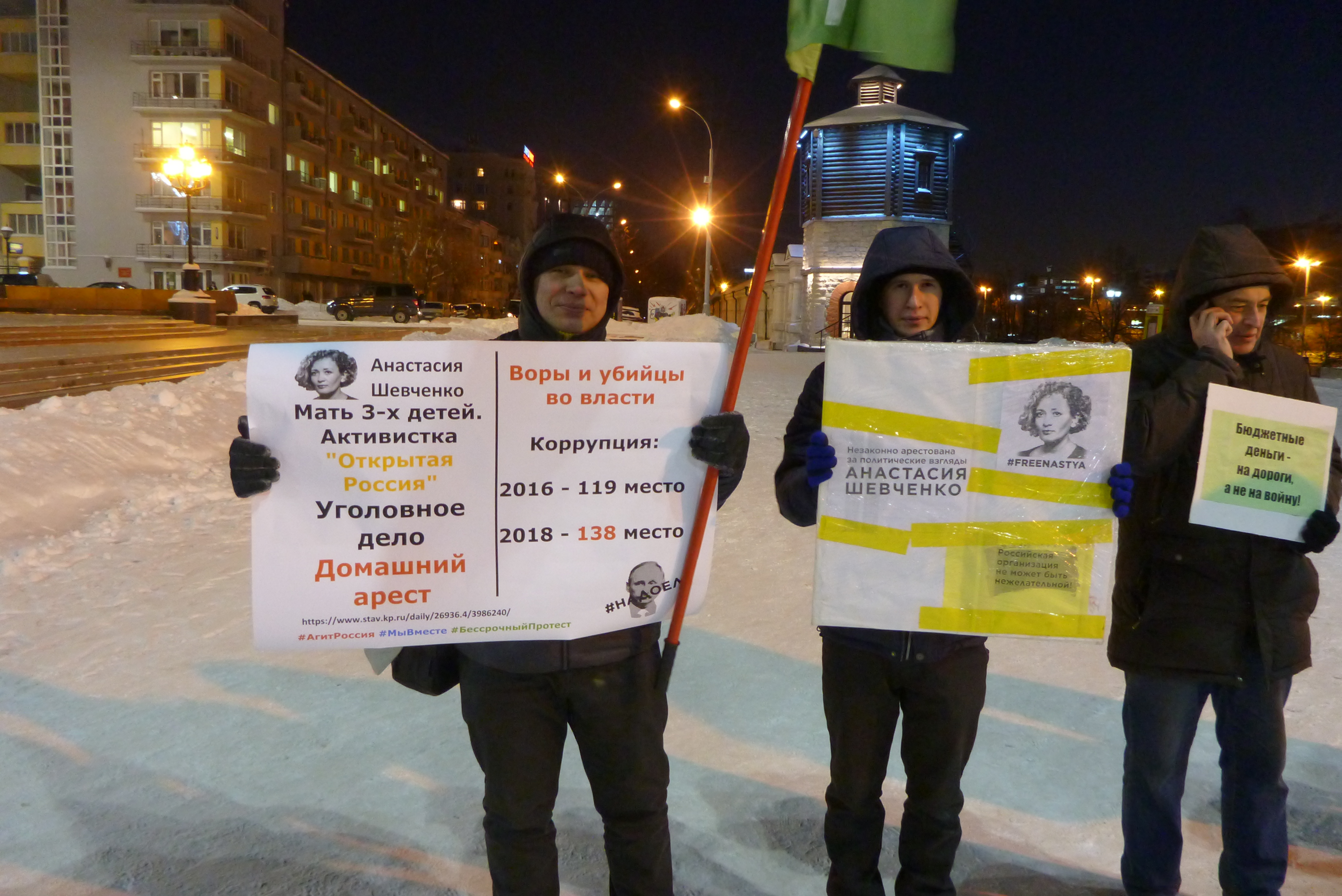
Picket in support of Anastasia Shevchenko, first person who was convicted for participation in an "undesirable" organisation

Russia's human rights ombudsperson Ella Pamfilova said the power given to the Prosecutor General to designate groups "undesirable" without going to court contradicts the Russian constitution and condemned the lack of a right to appeal.

German Chancellor Angela Merkel's spokesperson said that the law was an attempt to further isolate and discredit members of civil society who were critical of the government.

Britain's Minister for Europe, David Lidington, said it was "yet another example of the Russian authorities' harassment of NGOs and those who work with them in Russia".

The US State Department stated it was "deeply troubled" by the law and expressed concern that it "will further restrict the work of civil society in Russia and is a further example of the Russian government's growing crackdown on independent voices and intentional steps to isolate the Russian people from the world". The Deputy Chief of the US Mission to the OSCE Permanent Council urged the Russian government "to uphold its international obligations and OSCE commitments to respect the freedoms of expression, peaceful assembly and association, and the rule of law."

Amnesty International said the bill would "squeeze the life" from civil society, while Human Rights Watch warned it would be locals who would be worst-hit. Veteran human rights activist Lyudmila Alexeyeva described the law as "another step toward lowering the curtain between our country and the West."

On 13 June 2016, the opinion of the Venice Commission on Russian undesirable organizations law was published. According to the Venice Commission conclusion, Russian undesirable organizations law consists of vague definition of certain key concepts, such as "non-governmental organisations", which determines whether the activities of a foreign or international NGO may be declared undesirable, "directing of" and "participating in" the activities of a listed NGO, coupled with the wide discretion granted to the Office of the Public Prosecutor and the lack of specific judicial guarantees in the Federal Law, contradicts the principle of legality. The automatic legal consequences (blanket prohibitions) imposed upon NGOs whose activities are declared undesirable (prohibition to organise and conduct mass actions and public events or to distribute information materials) may only be acceptable in extreme cases of NGOs constituting serious threat to the security of the state or to fundamental democratic principles. In other instances, the blanket application of these sanctions might contradict the requirement under the European Convention on Human Rights that the interference with the freedom of association and assembly has to respond to a pressing social need and has to be proportional to the legitimate aim pursued. Furthermore, the inclusion of an NGO in the List should be made on the basis of clear and detailed criteria following a judicial decision or, at least, the decision should be subject to an appropriate judicial appeal.

== See also ==
- Russian foreign agent law
