= Institute for Statecraft =

Scotland-based think tank

The Institute for Statecraft is a pro-democracy think tank founded in 2009 by Christopher Donnelly and Daniel Lafayeedney, based in Fife, Scotland. Its stated objects are to advance education in the fields of governance and statecraft, and to advance human rights. Its funders include the UK government. The organisation manages the Integrity Initiative amongst other projects. It came to public attention in late 2018 when it was hacked and became the subject of controversy and of regulatory attention due to political posts on social media.

On 20 March 2023, the institute was declared an undesirable organisation in Russia.

== Work ==
The Institute employs around a dozen staff and has 90 external fellows. Insider.com described the Institute as "a studious foreign policy research institute founded by ex-military men who believe that Western government officials need to be better-educated about how Russia's spies and servicemen work", noting that it publishes reports, hosts conferences, brief inquiries and write books. Its academic papers are published through the Free University of Brussels; it has a partnership with the University of Leicester to review security, conflict and international development degrees; and its fellows include academics from Oxford and Cambridge universities. At the end of 2019, it filed to start awarding university degrees.

Its director of research is Nicolas de Pedro. Its Latin American programme is directed by Celia Szusterman, formerly of the University of Westminster, and her work on violence reduction has included partnerships between initiatives in Scotland (including the Violence Reduction Unit) and Central America.

=== Integrity Initiative ===
The Integrity Initiative is a project of the Institute for Statecraft with a stated mission of defending democracy from disinformation, in particular from Russia, as well as China and extremist groups such as the Islamic State of Iraq and the Levant (ISIL). To achieve this, expert groups were formed, primarily to analyse and discuss the problem of Russian disinformation.

==== Hacking ====
In late 2018, Russian media said that the international hacktivist group Anonymous released documents about the Integrity Initiative, that purported to show the programme was part of a disinformation project to interfere in other countries. The hacked documents were posted in four batches on the website of a hacktivist collective called CyberGuerrilla. RT said that the Integrity Initiative was using journalists to incite anti-Russian sentiment. The Foreign and Commonwealth Office (FCO) blamed Russia for the release of documents, which it said were "intended to confuse audiences and discredit an organisation which is working independently to tackle the threat of disinformation". Westminster sources said it was highly likely the attack was carried out by the GRU, possibly as revenge for Britain implicating the agency in the poisoning of Sergei and Yulia Skripal earlier in 2018. The documents were released in at least six dumps from November onwards. The FCO said the stolen documents included names of Foreign Office-funded projects and lists of friendly journalists. The GCHQ National Cyber Security Centre launched an inquiry into possible computer security breaches at the Institute for Statecraft. Insider.com later concluded that "The hack was probably by the Russians." The institute then accused Russian media of using information collected from the hack to publish conspiracy theories about the institute. In 2023, the Foreign, Commonwealth & Development Office (FCDO) stated that Russian Federal Security Service (FSB) had been identified as being involved in the 2018 hacking of the institute. In December 2021, the account of Christopher Donnelly was targeted by FSB, with documents subsequently leaked.

==== Twitter incident ====
In December 2018, the Sunday Mail reported that The Integrity Initiative's Twitter account had attacked then Leader of the Opposition Jeremy Corbyn, the Labour Party and Seumas Milne, the director of communications for Corbyn. The Foreign Office minister, Alan Duncan ordered an investigation into the reports and stated "Not only must [anti-Labour attacks by Statecraft] stop, I want to know why on earth it happened in the first place." MP Chris Williamson said that the Integrity Initiative's agenda included the "denigration of the Labour party and Jeremy Corbyn" and called for a parliamentary inquiry. Shadow Justice Minister Richard Burgon said "the Conservative government in this country shouldn't be using public funds or the state to undermine or attack the official opposition". In response to Labour Party complaints about this use of government funds in a parliamentary question on 12 December 2018, the minister stated that government funding "does [not] fund the management of the Integrity Initiative's social media account", to which Shadow Foreign Secretary Emily Thornberry responded that the Integrity Initiative project proposal included "social media activity". On 13 December 2018, the Scottish charity regulator OSCR confirmed it had opened an inquiry into the Institute for Statecraft.

In April 2019, IoS founder Christopher Donnelly apologised, noting that Scottish charity law does not allow them to make party political comment:

"We put out something like 26,000 tweets ... About 400 made reference to some political party or politician, and they were roughly equal between the main political parties, but we should not have sent [them] because the Foreign Office does not allow us to make any party political comment, nor does Scottish charity law. That was a mistake and we wrote letters of apology to Jeremy Corbyn. I have been special adviser to two Tory defence secretaries, and for Labour's John Reid and George Robertson, so we are as apolitical as we could be."

The Daily Record, which had published an examination of the Integrity Initiative earlier in 2019, was critical of the organisation after the release of the apology. In an editorial, it said that the Integrity Initiative "has apparently left itself exposed to Russian hackers, fallen foul of Foreign Office rules, made itself the subject of an emergency question in the House of Commons and apparently broken charity law". It claimed the organisation runs "clusters of media people, some who admit to being involved, others who don't". A Labour MSP also called for an investigation of the Integrity Initiative and its links to the British government.

In August 2019 the OSCR provided the findings of its investigation to the Institute for Statecraft. These were that the charity was not meeting the requirements of a charity in Scotland because its purpose was not entirely charitable, the Integrity Initiative did not provide a "public benefit in furtherance of the charity's purposes" and the benefits that the Institute provided to its trustees were not clearly incidental to its operation. The trustees of the Institute then took appropriate steps to comply with their requirements including terminating the charity's involvement with the Integrity Initiative. As a result, the OSCR announced in November 2019 that it would not take formal actions against the Institute and would continue to monitor its activities.

== Funding ==
In Financial Years 2016-17 and 2017–18, the UK Ministry of Defence through its Armed Forces Covenant Fund Trust's Local Grants Programme awarded a total of £177,650 to 12 separate small projects run by the Shared Outcomes Programme, an initiative of the Institute for Statecraft. In addition, in 2017 the British Army made a payment of £6,800 to the Institute for specialist training.

The institute has also received funding from NATO, the Lithuanian Ministry of Defence, the US State Department and Facebook.

The Integrity Initiative received government funding of £296,500 in the 2017-18 financial year and would receive a further £1,961,000 in 2018–19. This funding was allocated from the cross-department Conflict, Stability and Security Fund (CSSF), to counter disinformation overseas, as part of a £100 million five years programme. The funding was part of the Counter Disinformation and Media Development Programme.

== See also ==
- Countering Foreign Propaganda and Disinformation Act
- Propaganda in the Russian Federation
- Propaganda in the United States
