= EastCham Finland =

Finnish organization

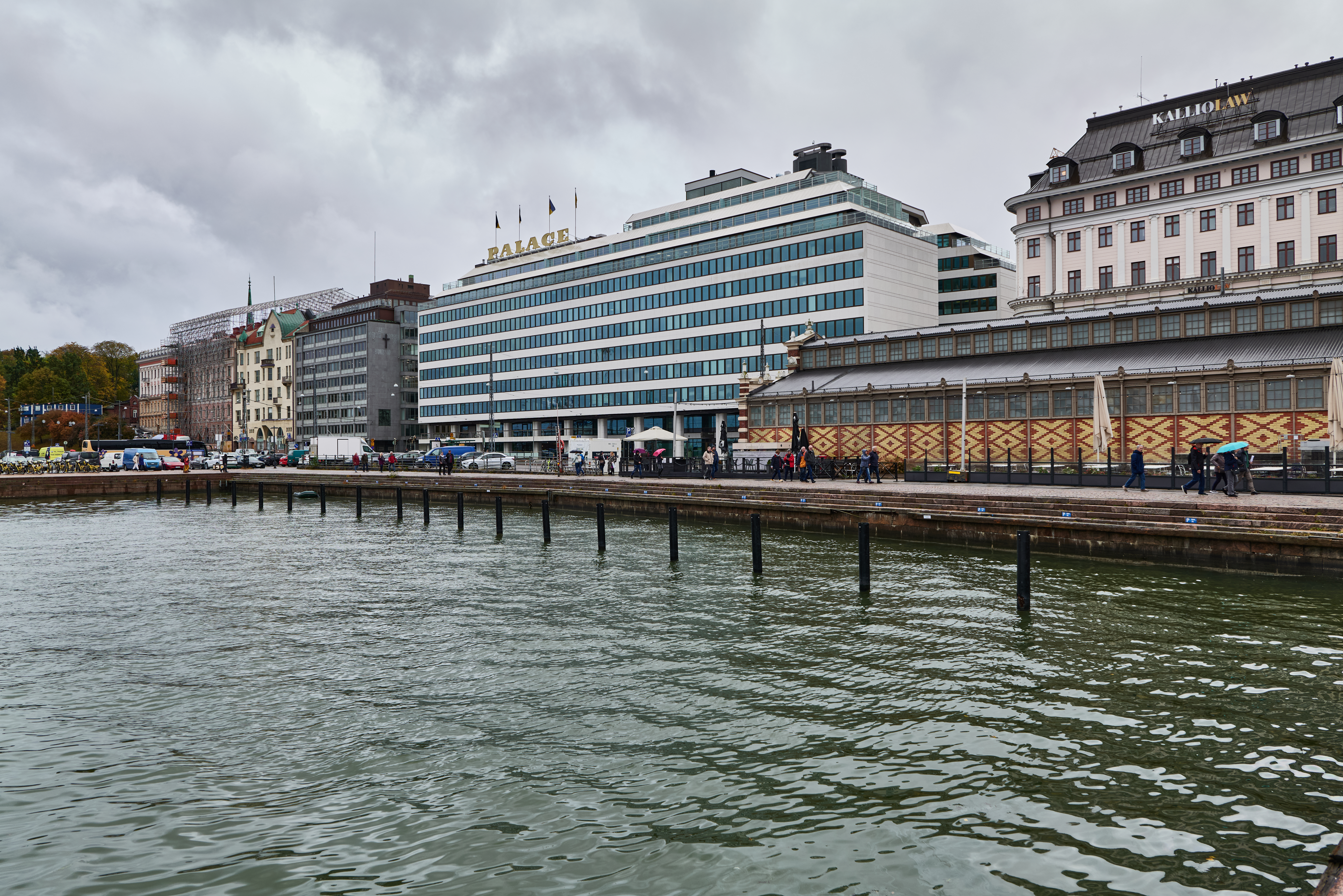
EastCham Finland is located at the Palace Building close to the Market Square in Helsinki.

EastCham Finland (EastCham Finland kauppakamariyhdistys ry.) is a non-profit organization, whose mission is to promote companies' business and competitiveness as well as economic relations in Ukraine, Central Asia and Southern Caucasus.

EastCham Finland is headquartered in Helsinki. It has offices also in Almaty, Kazakhstan and Kyiv, Ukraine.

== History ==
Finland's former Prime Minister Esko Aho served as the chairman of the FRCC from 2013 to 2019.

In 2020, the chamber had offices in Moscow, Saint Petersburg, and Yekaterinburg.

The war in Ukraine began in 2022. The Finnish-Russian Chamber of Commerce advised Finnish companies on complying with economic sanctions. The Chamber helped Finnish businesses withdraw from the Russian market. The sanctions undermined the foundation of the Chamber's operations, which is why it changed its name to EastCham Finland and decided to focus on new target countries in 2022.

Russia declared EastCham Finland as an undesirable organization in September 2023.

EastCham Finland's target countries are Ukraine, Georgia, Armenia, Azerbaijan, Kazakhstan, and Uzbekistan.

== See also ==
- Confederation of Finnish Industries
- European Federation of Bilateral Chambers of Commerce
