= Russian Democratic Society (UK) =

Human rights organization in the UK

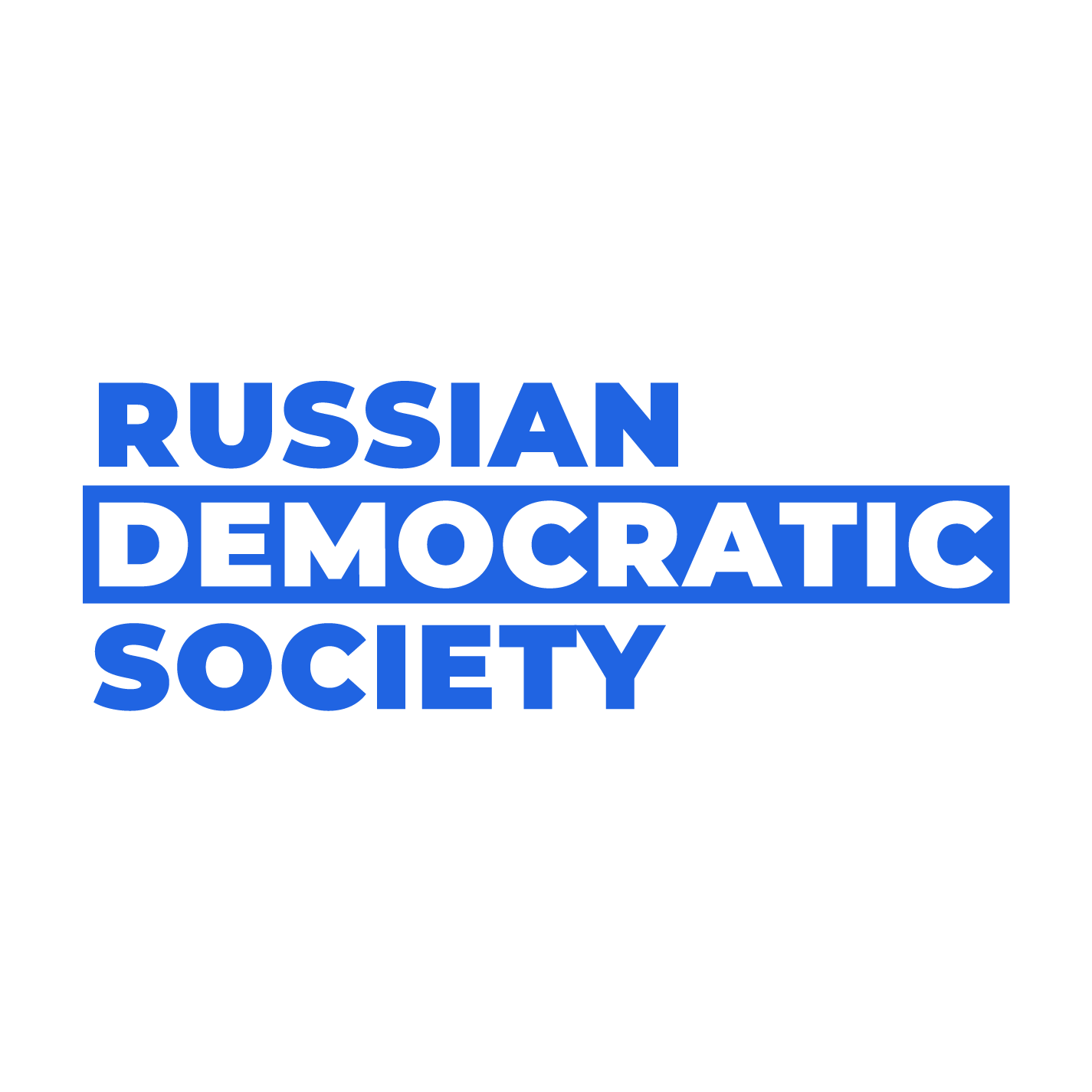
Logo of the Russian Democratic Society in the UK.: Abbreviation / RDS; Formation / March, 2022; Headquarters / London, GB

The Russian Democratic Society (RDS) is an organization located in London, United Kingdom, consisting mainly of Russian diaspora and their allies. It is best-known for its opposition to the Russian invasion of Ukraine and opposition to the leadership of Vladimir Putin.

The RDS was formally established as a Community Interest Company (CIC) on November 7, 2022, although the name 'Russian Democratic Society' had been in use prior to its official registration.

The establishment of the RDS is indicative of a wider trend among Russian immigrants and their supporters abroad, who actively participate in advocating for democratic principles and offering support to those affected by conflict and political repression.

== History ==
In the United Kingdom, the RDS has gained recognition for its role in orchestrating rallies that unite dissidents and figures from the Russian opposition. Beyond protest activities, the RDS has made contributions to humanitarian efforts, raising funds for the procurement of generators for Ukraine to mitigate the electricity shortages caused by the conflict.

The RDS actively supports the LGBTQ+ community in Russia, standing against legislation perceived to undermine LGBTQ+ rights.

In 2026, the RDS was designated as an undesirable organization in Russia.
