= Open Estonia Foundation =

Open society organization

Open Estonia Foundation (OEF, Estonian: Avatud Eesti Fond) is an Estonian organization which supports and develops open society in Estonia. To reach its goals, OEF organizes events, initiates programmes and supports projects.

OEF is established on 19 April 1990 with the support of philanthropist George Soros.

Every year, the OEF hands out its Concord Award (Estonian: Koosmeele auhind).

In July 2022, Russia designated Open Estonia Foundation as an "undesirable organisation".
