= Babayevo =

Babayevo (Russian: Бабаево) is the name of several inhabited localities in Russia.

== Modern localities ==
Urban localities

- Babayevo, Vologda Oblast, a town in Babayevsky District of Vologda Oblast

Rural localities

- Babayevo, Kaltasinsky District, Republic of Bashkortostan, a village in Kalmiyabashevsky Selsoviet of Kaltasinsky District in the Republic of Bashkortostan
- Babayevo, Mishkinsky District, Republic of Bashkortostan, a selo in Kameyevsky Selsoviet of Mishkinsky District in the Republic of Bashkortostan
- Babayevo, Maloyaroslavetsky District, Kaluga Oblast, a village in Maloyaroslavetsky District of Kaluga Oblast
- Babayevo, Yukhnovsky District, Kaluga Oblast, a village in Yukhnovsky District of Kaluga Oblast
- Babayevo, Kostroma Oblast, a village in Voskresenskoye Settlement of Nerekhtsky District in Kostroma Oblast; 57°32′N 40°43′E
- Babayevo, Mozhaysky District, Moscow Oblast, a village in Yurlovskoye Rural Settlement of Mozhaysky District in Moscow Oblast; 55°21′N 35°55′E
- Babayevo, Ruzsky District, Moscow Oblast, a settlement in Staroruzskoye Rural Settlement of Ruzsky District in Moscow Oblast; 55°40′N 36°10′E
- Babayevo, Pskov Oblast, a village in Pskovsky District of Pskov Oblast
- Babayevo, Tver Oblast, a village in Ploskoshskoye Rural Settlement of Toropetsky District in Tver Oblast
- Babayevo, Vladimir Oblast, a selo in Sobinsky District of Vladimir Oblast
- Babayevo (rural locality), Vologda Oblast, a village in Volodinsky Selsoviet of Babayevsky District in Vologda Oblast
- Babayevo, Bolsheselsky District, Yaroslavl Oblast, a village in Blagoveshchensky Rural Okrug of Bolsheselsky District in Yaroslavl Oblast
- Babayevo, Danilovsky District, Yaroslavl Oblast, a village in Babayevsky Rural Okrug of Danilovsky District in Yaroslavl Oblast
- Babayevo, Nekouzsky District, Yaroslavl Oblast, a village in Shestikhinsky Rural Okrug of Nekouzsky District in Yaroslavl Oblast
- Babayevo, Uglichsky District, Yaroslavl Oblast, a village in Ilyinsky Rural Okrug of Uglichsky District in Yaroslavl Oblast

== Alternative names ==
- Babayevo, alternative name of Babeyevo, a selo in Babeyevsky Selsoviet of Temnikovsky District in the Republic of Mordovia; 54°34′N 43°14′E
- Babayevo, alternative name of Babeyevo, a village in Stepanovskoye Rural Settlement of Noginsky District in Moscow Oblast; 55°43′N 38°26′E
