= Anna Lisitsyna =

Soviet partisan (1922–1942)

Anna Mikhaylovna Lisitsyna
- Анна Михайловна Лисицына
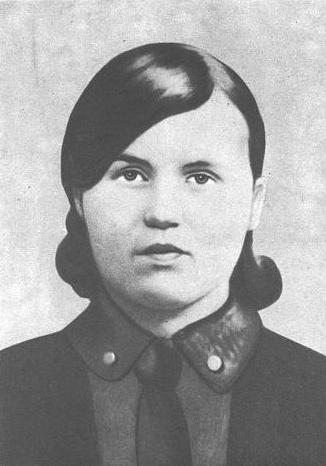
- Born: 14 February 1922; Zhitnoruchey, Karelian Labour Commune, Russian SFSR
- Died: 3 August 1942 (aged 20); Svir River, Russian SFSR, Soviet Union
- Cause of death: Drowning
- Awards: Hero of the Soviet Union; Order of Lenin; Order of the Red Star

Anna Mikhaylovna Lisitsyna (Russian: Анна Михайловна Лисицына; Veps: Anna Lisicina, Mihailan tütär; 14 February 1922 – 3 August 1942) was a Soviet partisan who was posthumously awarded the title of Hero of the Soviet Union on 25 September 1943 for her resistance activities.

== Early life ==
Lisitsyna was born on 14 February 1922 to a Vepsian family in Zhitnoruchey, Karelia. After graduating from secondary school in Rybreka she studied to become a librarian from 1938 to 1940 in Leningrad, after which she worked as a librarian at the Segezha Regional Club until the German invasion of the Soviet Union. She was a member of the Komsomol and enjoyed sports, including cycling, skiing, and sharpshooting, which later proved to be useful skills when she was a partisan.

== Partisan activities ==
On 15 June 1942 Lisitsyna, fellow partisan Mariya Melentyeva, and six other partisans were sent by the Red Army behind enemy lines in Leningrad for a one-month reconnaissance-in-force mission, where the two were assigned to establish an underground Komsomol Committee and construct safehouses for other partisans in Sheltozero in addition to gathering information on enemy forces, fortresses, and firing points. A village elder where she was stationed assisted in establishing the Komsomol division, which spread anti-axis leaflets in prisoner-of-war camps and in Finnish Army barracks. After pinpointing locations of Axis garrisons for the Soviet Airforce to bomb and lists of names of several individuals who had assisted the Axis, the partisans were told they would have to return to Soviet-controlled territory alone because the aircraft assigned to transporting them could not make the trip. The journey required the partisans to cross the Svir river, which was icy but not frozen. When they discovered the small boat intended for the crossing was gone, they constructed a haphazard raft that fell apart during the crossing. After she fell into the water she removed her heavy dress and placed the important documents on her head under her hat; due to the temperature of the water Lisitsyna developed cramps so bad she couldn't move, but couldn't yell for help because there were several enemy camps on the shore. Melentyeva tried to save Lisitsyna but couldn't carry her across the river, so she left Lisitsyna behind and took the documents from Lisitsyna with her.

== Recognition ==
Lisitsyna was posthumously awarded the title Hero of the Soviet Union on 25 September 1943 by decree of the Supreme Soviet. The street named after her in Petrozavodsk bears a memorial plaque to her and her image was featured in the Petrozavodsk Gallery of Heroes.

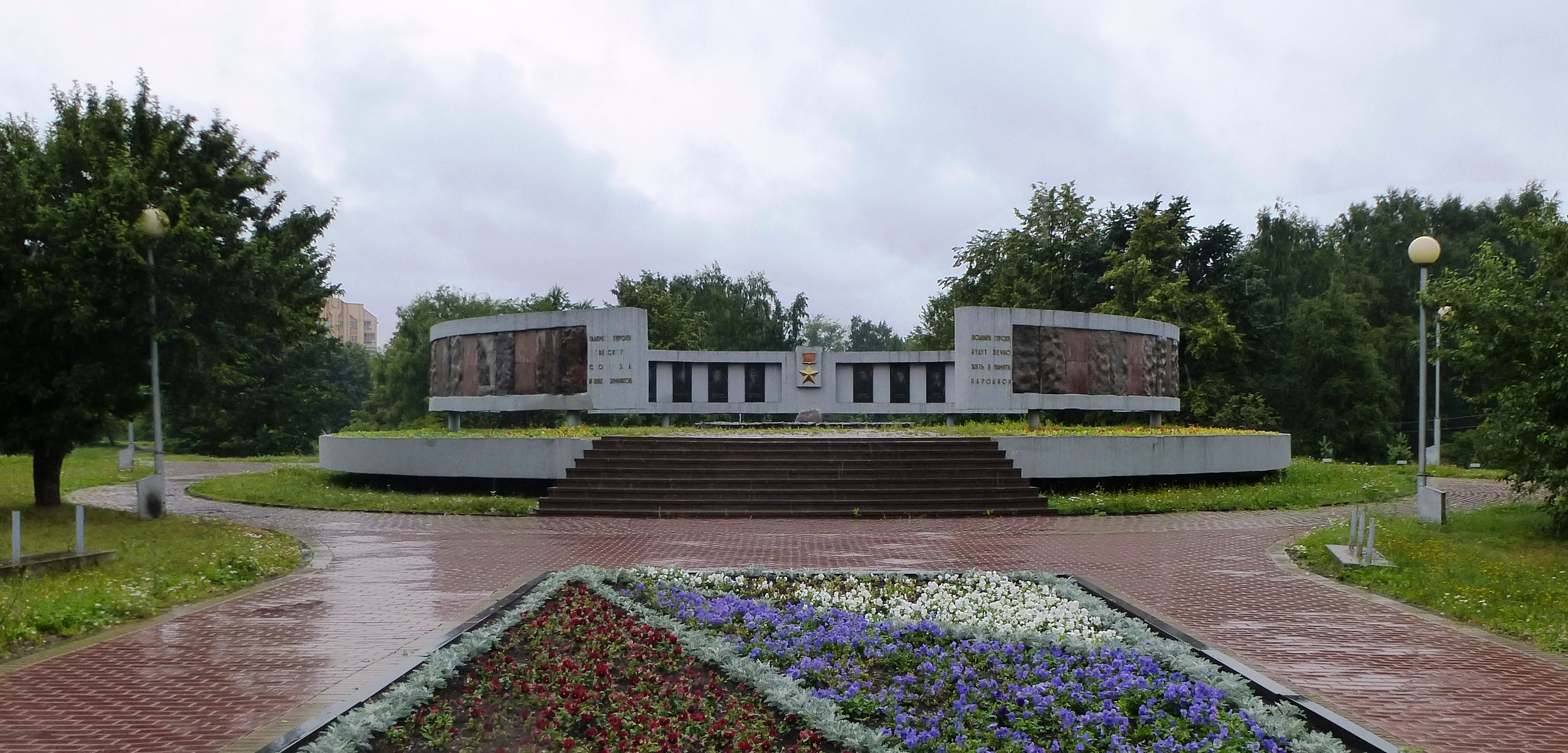
Petrozavodsk Gallery of Heroes

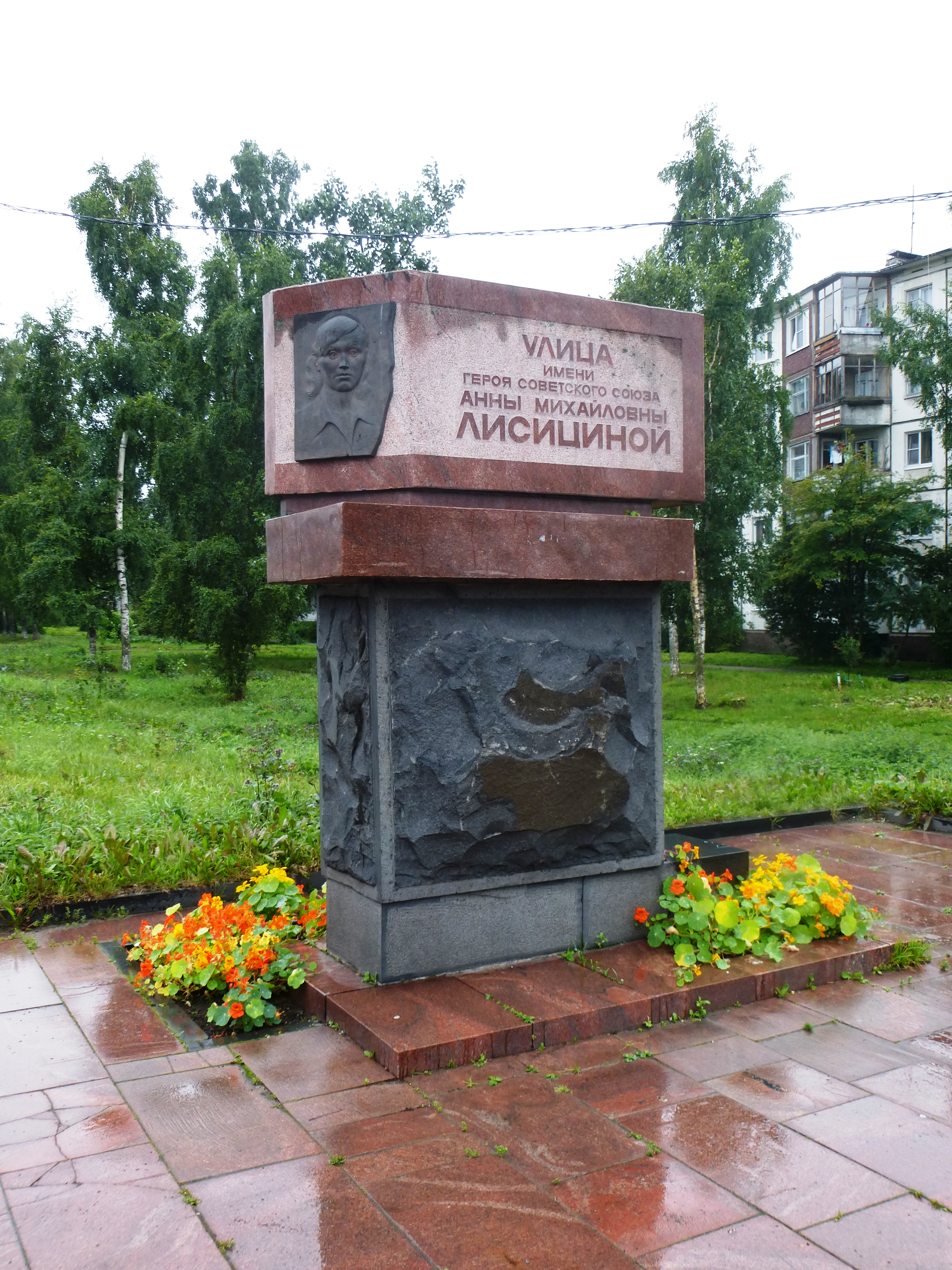
Memorial to her in Petrozavodsk

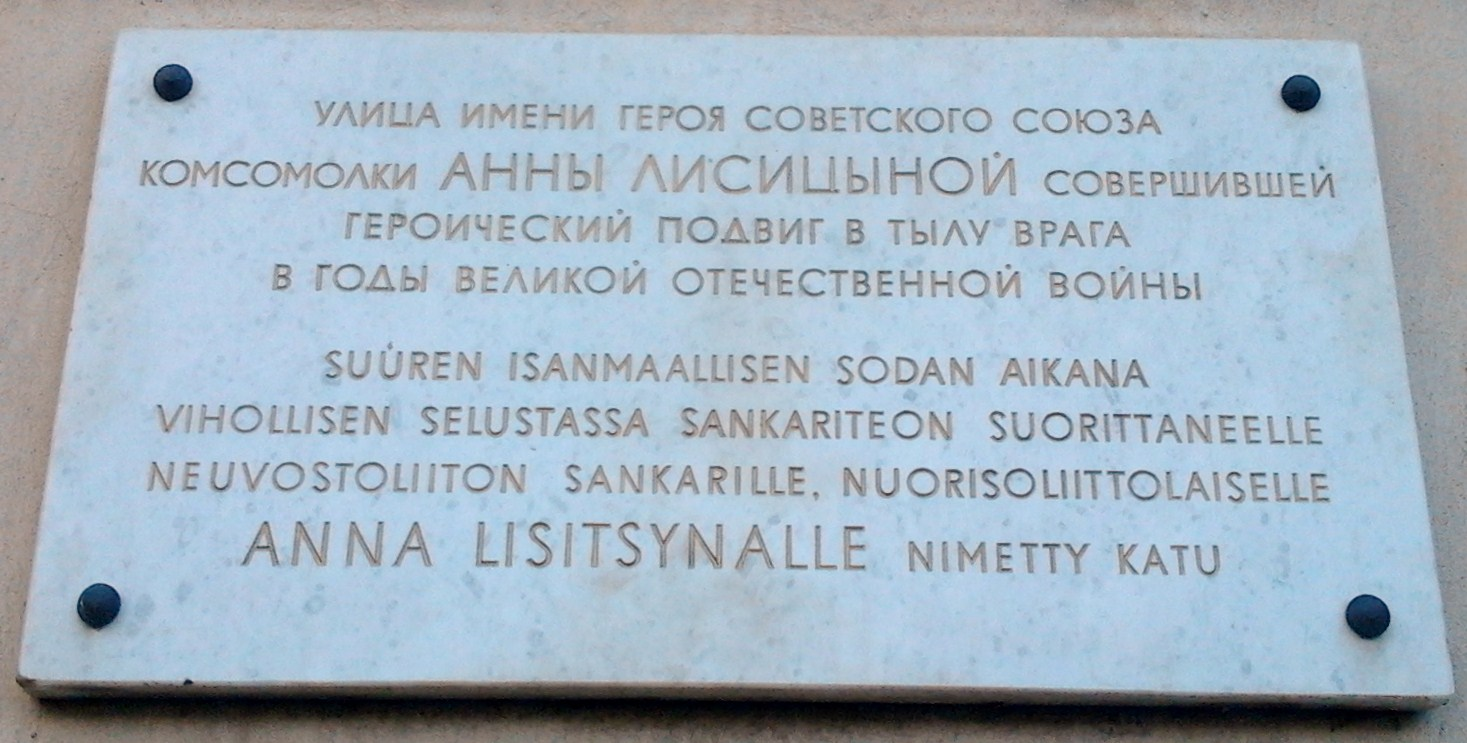
Memorial plaque to Lisitsyna

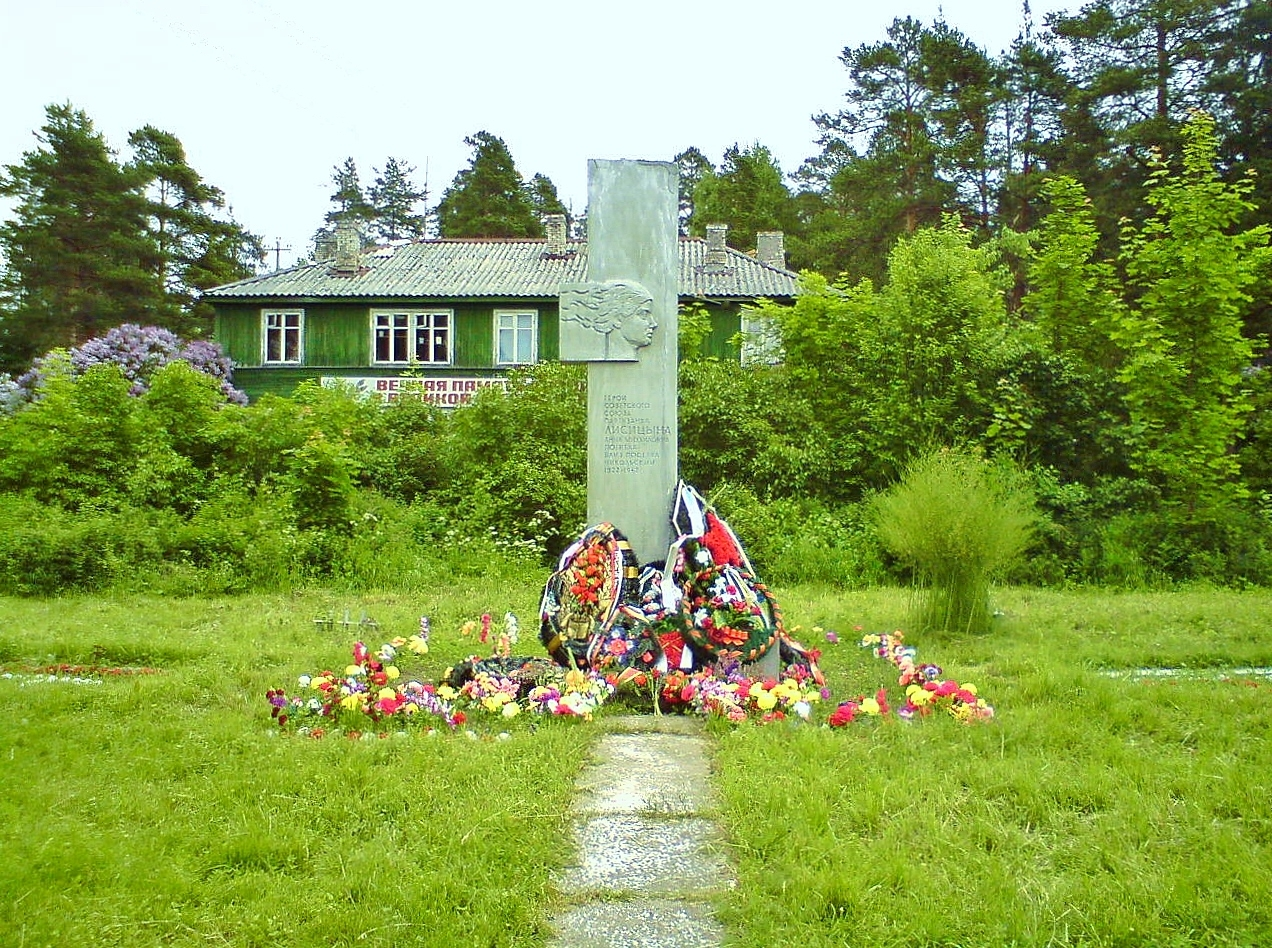
Monument to her in Nikolsky, Podporozhsky District

== See also ==
- List of female Heroes of the Soviet Union
- Soviet partisans
