= Veps =

Veps may refer to:

- Veps (band), an indie pop band from Oslo, Norway
- Vepsians, a Finno-Ugric people of northwest Russia
- Veps language, the language spoken by the Vepsians
- Veps National Volost
- Veps Upland

== See also ==
- VEP (disambiguation)
