= Ryurik Lonin =

Russian author (1930–2009)

Rjurik Petrovič Lonin
- Born: 22 September 1930; Kaskesruchey, Karelian ASSR, Russian SFSR, Soviet Union
- Died: 17 July 2009 (aged 78); Shyoltozero, Republic of Karelia, Russia
- Occupations: Toolmaker, museum worker
- Spouse: Anna Petrovna Lonina
- Writing career
- Genres: Folklore, local history

Rjurik Petrovič Lonin (Note: Russian: Рю́рик Петро́вич Ло́нин, romanized: Ryurik Petrovich Lonin, Veps: Rürik Petrovič Lonin) (22 September 1930 – 17 July 2009) was a Russian collector of Veps folklore, founder of the Lonin Museum of Veps Ethnography, and an author in the Veps and Russian languages. He has been characterised as the most important Veps person ever to have lived and the best-known Veps person of his time.

== Biography ==
Rjurik Lonin was born in the Vepsian village of Kaskesruchey in modern-day Prionezhsky District by Lake Onega, as the first child from the second marriage of Pjotr Lonin (Russian: Пётр Ло́нин, born ca. 1888). His mother was Fjokla Lonina (née Ryabčikova) from Vekhruchey.

According to Lonin himself, he was named after Prince Rurik of Novgorod. His father believed that Prince Rurik had been Veps by ethnicity.

Lonin began school in Kaskez' in the late 1930s. In 1941, when he was eleven years old, the Finnish Army occupied his home area during the Continuation War. He then attended the Finnish school established by the occupiers. Lonin has said that only two people from his home village were evacuated further in the Soviet Union. They were the head of the local kolkhoz and the teacher Maria Ivanovna Pepšina (b. 1915). They were the only persons in the village who were members of the Communist Party of the Soviet Union. After the Finns retreated, he continued at school with the pre-war teacher. More than half a century later, Lonin wrote a book about his wartime experiences, entitled Detstvo, opalyonnoye voĭnoĭ ("a childhood scorched by war"). It was published in 2004.

At the age of 16, Lonin moved to Petrozavodsk and studied at a vocational school, and from 1948 on, he worked as a toolsmith and farm machinery mechanic at a garage.

While living in the city, Lonin began to write poetry in Veps, and after various episodes, he was asked to visit the Department of Languages, Literature and History (YALI) of the Karelian branch of the Soviet Academy of Sciences, where Nikolai Bogdanov, researcher of the Veps language, urged him to collect Veps folklore instead of writing poetry, which Lonin began in 1956. He was no stranger to this task, having begun to collect Russian folk songs in his home village during the Finnish occupation. He now became an assistant at YALI, and he was given a letter of recommendation from the Academy of Sciences. Some items collected by Lonin were published in 1969 in the book Obrazcy vepsskoĭ reči ("samples of the Veps language"). In the book's foreword, Lonin is described as "a resident of the Šoutar'v village who is an enthusiastic collector of Veps folklore".

In 1958, while still living in Petrozavodsk, Lonin attended a concert held in the Sulazhgora neighbourhood. When the choir sang a Veps number, Vepsän ma om randanröunal ("The Veps land lies along the shore"), he was overcome by homesickness and decided to move to the village of Šoutar'v, where his parents lived at the time. He found a job as a toolmaker at the village sovkhoz.

== Founding of the Šoutar'v (Shyoltozero) Museum ==
In 1963, Lonin made his first folklore-collecting trip outside of Karelia, to the Veps villages of the Lodeĭnopol'skiĭ raĭon in the Leningrad Oblast'. In 1964, on a similar trip, the idea occurred to him that he should try to found a Veps ethnographic museum in his home village of Šoutar'v. He repeatedly presented applications to this effect to the local village soviet, and finally in 1967, in honour of the fiftieth anniversary of the founding of the Soviet Union, he was given two rooms from the village library for his museum. The opening was held on 28 October, a week before the anniversary of the Russian Revolution. In 1980, the museum became part of the Karelian Regional Museum, and in 1982, it was given new premises in the so-called Mel'kin House at Mel'kamättaz ("Mel'kin's Hill"), in Šoutar'v. It is the only museum in Russia dedicated to the presentation of Veps culture.

Lonin remained a scientific employee of the museum until 2001.

In May 2010, the name of the museum was changed to the Rjurik Lonin Veps Ethnographic Museum in Shyoltozero (Russian: Шeлтозерский вепсский этнографический музей имени Р. Лонина).

== Efforts to revive Veps culture ==
Around the 1980s, Lonin participated in revival efforts of the Veps language and culture. He worked as a Veps language teacher at the Shyoltozero school between 1987 and 1989, where he translated the booklet Iisusan elo ("the life of Jesus") and the Gospel of Mark, and although neither was printed, this marked the beginning of Bible translations in the Veps language. Lonin was later part of a group that commented upon the texts produced by Bible translator Nina Zaitseva.

Lonin was a longtime member of the Veps national choir in Shyoltozero (1957–2001).

He participated in the third World Congress of Finno-Ugric Peoples in Helsinki in December 2000, and he also took part in the First Veps Authors' World Conference in Kuhmo, Finland, in the autumn of 2002.

== Honours and recognition ==
During his life, Lonin was awarded the Jubilee Medal "For Valiant Labour – 100 Years of V. I. Lenin" (1970) and the Medal "Veteran of Labour" (1987). He was one of the winners of the All-Union Amateur Artists' Festival (1985) as well as in the Second All-Union Popular Culture Festival (1987). He was given the title "Distinguished Cultural Worker of the Republic of Karelia" in 1992, a medal and a diploma named after T. G. Ryabinin for "Enlightenment Work in the Russian North" (1995), and an award from the Open Society Institute of George Soros for "Devoted Work".

== Works ==
- Lühüdad pajoižed ("short songs", a collection of chastushkas). 71 p. Petroskoi: Karjalan valdkundan rahvhaližen politikan komitet, 2000. Painua: 1000.
- Minun rahvhan fol'klor ("the folklore of my people"). 108 p. Petroskoi: Periodika, 2000. Tiraž: 2000.
- Katalog lichnogo arhhiva Ryurika Petrovicaa Lonina. ("catalogue of the personal archive of Rjurik Lonin") Petrozavodsk: Sholtozerskiĭ ètnograficheskiĭ muzeĭ i Karel'skiĭ gosudarstvennyĭ krayevedecheskiĭ muzeĭ, 2000. Tiraž: 50.
- Zapiski krayeveda ("notes from a student of the local lore"). 72 p. Petrozavodsk: Muzeĭnoye agenstvo, 2000. Tiraž: 150.
- Detstvo, opalyonnoye voĭnoĭ ("a childhood scorched by war"). 99 p. Petrozavodsk: Verso, 2004. Tiraž: 500.
- Khranitel vepsskoĭ kultury ("keeper of the Veps culture"). 95 p. Petrozavodsk, Sholtozero: Karelskiĭ gosudarstvennyĭ krayevedecheskiĭ muzeĭ/Karelskiĭ nauchnyĭ centr RAN, 2007. Tiraž: 300.

== Articles on the history of the Shyoltozero museum published in Finnish ==
- "Vepsän vainioilla" (Beginning of Lonin's memoirs). Punalippu (Petrozavodsk) 1/1982, p. 106–111.
- "Vepsän vainoilla" (End of Lonin's memoirs). Punalippu 2/1982, p. 116–123.
- "Kiinnostukseni taustat". ("how I became interested (in my people's culture)") Punalippu 2/1989, p. 123–128.

== Other writings ==
- "O sosdanii muzeya vepsskoĭ kul'tury v sele Shëltozero" ("on the founding of the Veps museum in Šoutar'v"). In: V. V. Pimenov, Z. I. Strogal'ščikova, Yu. Yu. Surhasko (ed.), Problemy istorii i kul'tury vepsskoĭ narodnosti ("problems of the history and culture of the Veps people"). Petrozavodsk, 1989.
