= VNV =

VNV may refer to:

- Flemish National Union, a Nationalist Flemish political party in Belgium, founded by Staf de Clercq on October 8, 1933. De Clercq became known as den Leider ("the Leader")
- VNV Nation, an Irish electronic music group resident in Germany

== People ==
- Viktor Nikolayevich Vladimirov (born 1979), Russian professional football player. He last played for FC Torpedo Vladimir
- Valentin Voloshinov
- Vladimir Voronin
- Vladislav Volkov

== Places ==
- Veps National Volost
