= Babeyevo =

Babeyevo may refer to:

- Babeyevo, Republic of Mordovia, a village (selo) in the Republic of Mordovia, Russia
- Babeyevo, Pskov Oblast, a village in Pskov Oblast, Russia
- Babeyevo, name of several other rural localities in Russia
