= VEP =

Vep may refer to:

- vep, the ISO 639-3 code for the Veps language
- Vép, a town in Vas County, Hungary

VEP may refer to:

- Variable electro-precipitator, a waste water remediation unit using electrocoagulation
- Visual evoked potential, a nervous response to light
- Venus Entry Probe, the former name of the European Venus Explorer
- Voluntary Euthanasia Party, in Australia
- Voter Education Project, a 1960s U.S. organisation for distributing funds to the civil rights movement
- Signature of Victor E. Pazmiño, an American cartoonist
- British Rail Class 423, aka "4Vep", "4VEP" or simply "VEP"
- Ensembl Genomes § Variant Effect Predictor, a bioinformatic tool
- Vulnerabilities Equities Process, used by the U.S. government to determine its response to security vulnerabilities

== See also ==
- Veps (disambiguation)
