= Veps flag =

Ethnic flag of the Veps people, also the former flag of the Veps National Volost

- Flag of the Veps National Volost
- Adopted: 16 May 2000; 26 years ago
- Relinquished: 1 January 2006; 20 years ago
- Design: A green field charged with a yellow-fimbriated blue Nordic cross that extends to the edges; the vertical part of the cross is shifted to the hoist side.
- Designed by: Vitaly Dobrynin

The Veps flag (Note: Veps: Vepsän flag, Russian: Флаг вепсов) is an ethnic flag, used by the Veps people since 1992. Between 2000 and its abolition in 2005, it was also used as the flag of the Veps National Volost (Note: Veps: Vepsän rahvahaližen volostin flag, Russian: Флаг Ве́псской национальной волости).

== History ==
The Veps, neighbours to the Ingrians, are also today striving to restore their ancient and splendidly beautiful land. They still have neither a coat of arms nor a national flag.

— I. S. Smetannikov, ed. (1991). "Coats of Arms of Ingria". Heraldist Bulletin (newspaper) (in Russian) (1 (4)): 3. Archived from the original on 2026-07-05.

The Veps flag project was created by the Karelian artist Vitaly Dobrynin in 1992, based on the Flag of the North Karelian State created by Akseli Gallen-Kallela. In June of that same year, it was first presented by Nina Zaitseva and Zinaida Strogalshchikova at the “Tree of Life” Veps summer festival in Rybreka, marking the end of the Year of Veps Culture.

In the autumn of 1992, the agenda of the next session of the Supreme Soviet of the Karelian ASSR of the 12th convocation, included the question “On the state symbols of the Republic of Karelia.” Among other options, the flag of the Vepsians proposed by S. Popov was also put to a vote; it received only three votes — the fewest of all the submitted projects.

The flag was adopted as the flag of the Veps National Volost from the 16th of May, 2000 until its abolition. As of 2003, it was the only municipal flag in use within the Republic of Karelia besides the flag of Petrozavodsk.

== Design ==
=== Symbolism ===
The symbolism of the flag is closely connected to the geographic and natural features of the municipality. The presence of green and blue reflects continuity with the colour palette of the Republic of Karelia.

- Green — a symbol of growth; it represents the region’s forests and meadows.
- Blue — the colour of the beauty of the region's lakes and rivers.
- Yellow — the colour symbolizing awakening to life.

The Nordic cross is a common element on the flags of Finno-Ugric peoples (in particular, the ethnic groups of Fennoscandia).

=== Variants ===
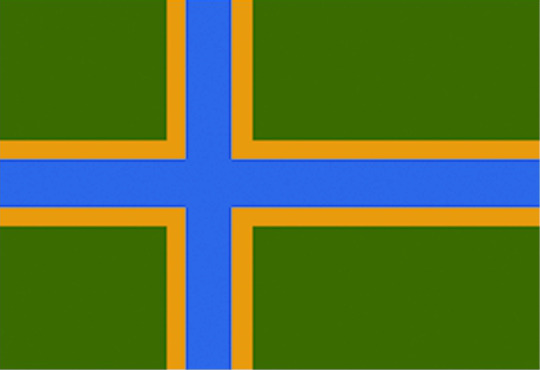

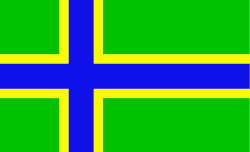

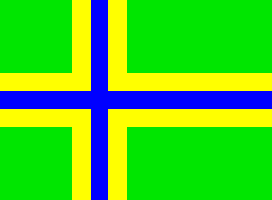

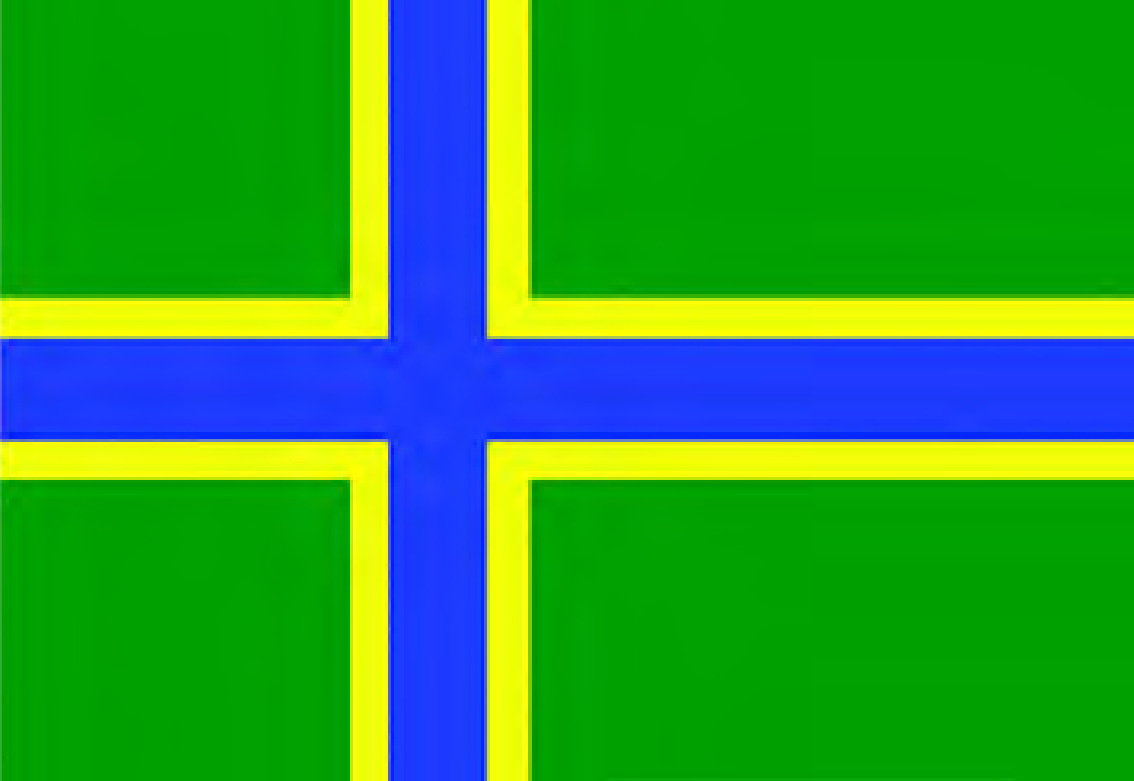

== See also ==
- Veps people
- Flag of Karelia
- Flag of Finland
