= Lonin Museum of Veps Ethnography =

The Rjurik Lonin Veps Ethnographic Museum in Šoutjärv’ (Shyoltozero)
- Mel’kinan pertt'
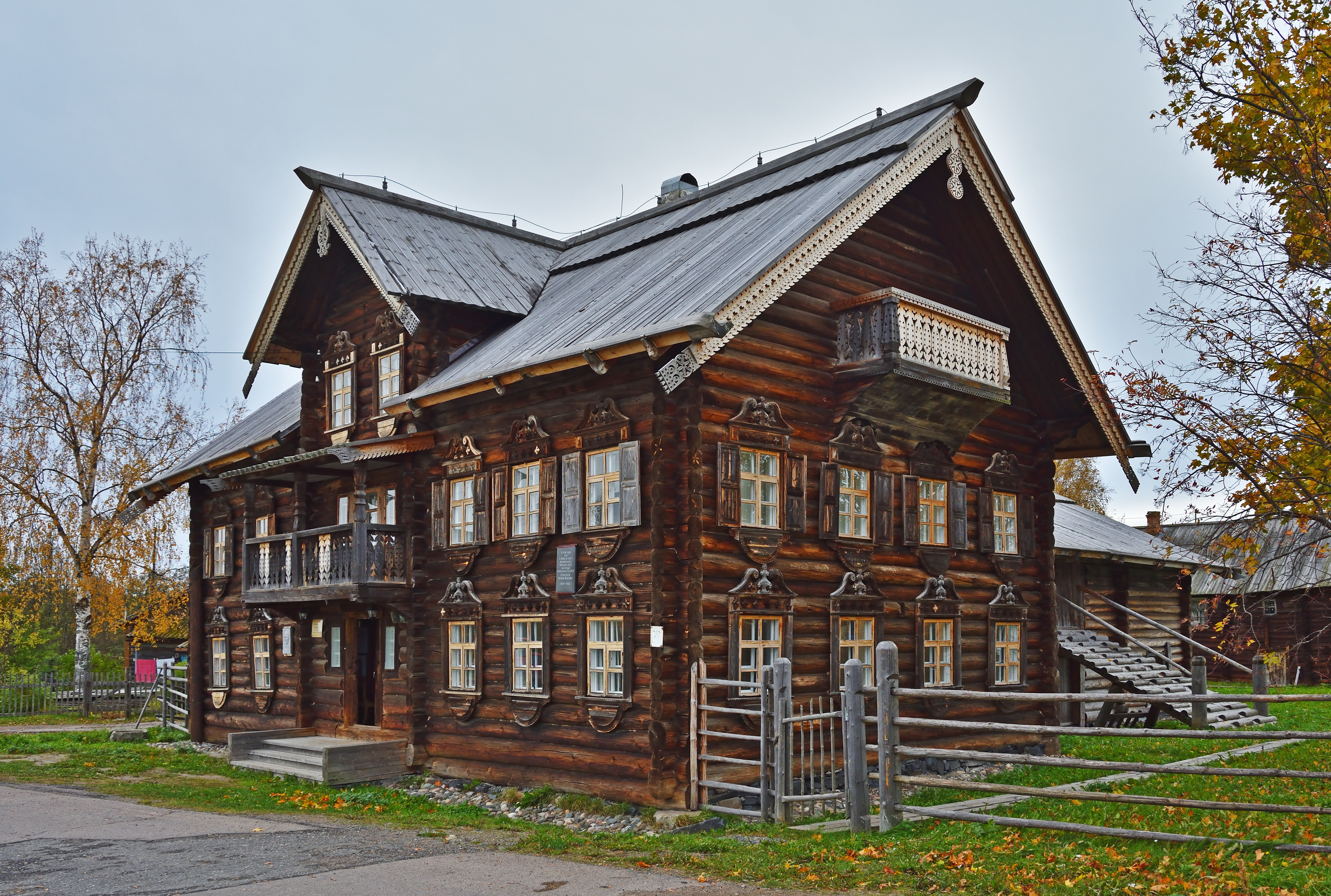
- Interactive map of the The Rjurik Lonin Veps Ethnographic Museum in Šoutjärv’ (Shyoltozero) area

General information
- Type: Veps peasant home
- Location: Shyoltozero, Republic of Karelia, Ulica Pochtovaya, d. 28
- Coordinates: 61°22′15″N 35°21′29″E
- Completed: 19th century
- Inaugurated: 28 October 1967

Technical details
- Floor count: 2

Design and construction
- Architect: Ivan Mel’kin

The Rjurik Lonin Museum of Veps Ethnography in Shyoltozero (Russian: Шёлтозерский вепсский этнографический музей имени Р. Лонина, romanized: Shyoltozerskiĭ vepsskiĭ ètnograficheskiĭ muzeĭ imeni R. Lonina; Veps: Šoutjärven vepsläine etnografine Rjurik Lonin muzei) is a museum located in Shyoltozero (Veps Šoutjärv’) in the Republic of Karelia in the Prionezhskiĭ District, located 84 km south of Petrozavodsk, the capital of the republic.

== History of the museum ==
The museum was founded in 1967 by a Veps resident of the Sholtozero village, sovkhoz worker Rjurik Lonin (1930–2009), who was originally from the Kaskez' village, likewise located in the Prionezhskiĭ District, at the southern border of the Karelian Republic.

Lonin had been interested in collecting folklore already in his early years during the Finnish occupation of his home area in the Second World War. Later, when he was living in Petrozavodsk, Nikolai Bogdanov, a researcher of the Veps language in the Karelian branch of the Soviet Academy of Sciences, in the Department of Languages, Literature and History (YALI), encouraged Lonin to collect Veps folklore. When he was travelling in the Veps villages in the Republic of Karelia and the Leningrad Oblast’ in 1964, Lonin realised that there was a need to collect specimens of the material culture of the Veps people:

As I travelled around the Veps territory, I saw many different kinds of old tools, wooden and clay vessels, embroidered towels, etc. I could see that the Veps were master craftsmen with birch bark and wood. So, why not collect for the benefit of the future generations, all the things that their ancestors had been using and found a museum for them? I was very sorry to see that the young Veps people did not know old stories, legends and songs, or that they did not know the history of their own people, because none of this has been taught at their schools. So in 1964, I wrote to the newspaper of our district, that is, the Prionezhkiĭ district, and asked the residents of all the Veps villages of Šokš, Vehkoi, Šoutarv, Kaleig and Kaskez to donate to our future national museum things that had become useless in their households, such as cooking forks, grinding stones, washing basins, birch bark and clay vessels, etc. I also spoke about this matter on the local radio. Soon people began to give me old things of all kinds.

Artefacts began to accumulate in Lonin's house so that the attic, the wood shed and even the living quarters were full of all kinds of things. Soon the collection was so large that the wife began to nag about it.

During the next few years Lonin repeatedly turned to the Sholtozero Selsoviet asking for premises for a museum, but to no effect. Finally, in 1967, just before the festivities of the 50th anniversary of the Russian Revolution, the village soviet gave Lonin two rooms in the building of the village library, which was located near House of Culture (the former church building) in the Dokuc' neighbourhood of the village. As the opening day approached, the vice director of the Karelian Local Heritage Museum, Yefrem Rybak came to Sholtozero, but he had many doubts about the museum project. However, after he had become acquainted with Lonin, his collections and his ideas, he decided to help him. The museum was opened on 28 October 1967, a week before the anniversary of the Revolution. One of the rooms presented the Veps culture of the pre-Revolutionary times, the other concentrated on contemporary culture in the Veps villages. One stand was dedicated to the Veps people and the people of Sholtozero and their exploits in the Great Patriotic War.

When the museum had nearly 3000 artefacts in its collections, it was given a building in the Hamamättaz neighbourhood. In accordance with the decision of the Karelian Ministry of Culture, from the beginning of 1980, the museum became a branch of the Karelian Local Heritage Museum, and it was now called the Branch of Veps Ethnography. Lonin now became a full-time employee of the museum.

== The Mel’kin House ==
In the 1980s, the museum was given new premises in the so-called Mel’kin House in the Mel’kamättas ('Mel’kin's Hill') neighbourhood, where it is now located. According to the home pages of the museum, this house "was built in the mid-19th century and it is a monument of Karelian wooden architecture". This house was built by Ivan Mel’kin, who was a famous stonemason, known for his work with porphyry stone. According to Lonin, Mel’kin built the Red Bridge or the Theater Bridge that crosses the Griboyedov Canal, and in the past this bridge was known as "Mel’kin Bridge". The last master of the house was Ivan Vasil’yevich Mel’kin. The last noteworthy representative of this family was Nikolai Mel’kin (born 1929), who was a prominent and long-time member of the Sholtozero Veps National Choir.

== The Tuchin House ==
The Tuchin House, located behind the Mel’kin House, is also part of the museum. This house was originally located in the village of Kalinansar', along the road to Matfejansel’g (Matfeyeva Sel’ga), and it was moved to its present location in 1977. During the Finnish occupation its residents were Dmitriĭ Yegorovich Tuchin and his wife Maria Mihaĭlovna Tuchina. Dmitriĭ Tuchin functioned as the village elder in the Finnish administration, but he also accommodated Soviet partisans in his house. The novel The Operation in the Vacuum Zone by Oleg Tikhonov tells about the activities of Dmitriĭ Tuchin during the war. An excerpt of this novel has been published in Finnish in the journal Punalippu ('The Red Flag').

A well known resident of this house during the war was Sylvi Paaso, a Finnish-born Soviet partisan and radio operator, who kept the Soviet troops up to date on the movements of the Finnish troops along Lake Onega.

== The museum at present ==
The name of the museum is, as of May 2010, the Rjurik Lonin Museum of Veps Ethnography in Sholtozero (Russ. Шeлтозерский вепсский этнографический музей имени Р. Лонина) in honour of its founder. The collections of the museum consist of ca. 6000 artefacts, of which, according to the museum, 2000 are on display. The museum is said to have up to 4000 visitors every year.

The director of the museum is Ms. Natal’ya Ankhimova, originally from the Ogerišt village in the nearby Vehkoi.
