= Lebedevo =

Lebedevo Лебедево
- Village
- Location within Vologda Oblast Location within Russia
- Coordinates: 59°31′N 35°32′E
- Country: Russia
- Region: Vologda Oblast
- District: Babayevsky District
- Time zone: UTC+3:00

Lebedevo (Russian: Ле́бедево) is a rural locality or village in Babayevsky District, Vologda Oblast, Russia. The population was 9 as of 2002.
