= Nikolay Abramov (writer) =

Russian Vepsian writer and poet

Nikolay Viktorovich Abramov (also spelled Nikolai; Russian: Николай Викторович Абрамов; January 24, 1961 – January 23, 2016) was a Russian ethnic Vepsian writer, translator, journalist and poet. He was a leading proponent of the Veps language, as well as Vepsian literature and culture in Russia. The Vepsians are a Finnic people of northern Russia whose language belongs to the Uralic languages.

== Life and career ==
Abramov composed poems and literature in both Vepsian and Russian, which have been translated into more than 20 languages. He was the author of seven collections of poetry, which have been released in Vepsian, Russian, Estonian, French and Hungarian.

Abramov first published his poetry in the Finnish-language journal, Punalippu, in February 1989. His book, Koumekümne koume, which was released in 1994, was the first Vepsian-language book of literature ever published.

He was accepted into the Writers' Union of Russia in 1998 and was also a member of Karelian Writers' Union. The Russian Republic of Karelia named him an "Honored Worker of Culture of the Republic of Karelia." The Barents Euro-Arctic Region cultural center in Overkalix, Sweden, awarded Abramov a literary prize in August 2006.

In 2013, a collection of eighty Vepsian language poems Оять-ёген рандал... (Ojat-jogjen randal...) written by Abramov, was published. This collection is believed to be the third Veps language book to be written using the Cyrillic alphabet in history. Traditionally, the Veps language is written in the Latin script.

In addition to his literary work, Abramov served as head bibliographer for the National Library of the Republic of Karelia in Petrozavodsk.

== Works authored ==
=== Veps language books ===
- Koumekümne koume (1994)
- Kurgiden aig (1999)
- Pagiškam, vell'' (2005)

=== Poetry ===
- Kahtišti koumekümne koume (2010)
- Kurgede aeg (2010)
- Les chants des forêts (2011)
- Оять-ёген рандал... (2013)
