= Veps people =

Ethnic group of northern Europe

Veps Vepsläižed
- Veps flag

Total population
- 4,877

Regions with significant populations
- Russia: 4,534 (2021)
- Ukraine: 281 (2001)
- Estonia: 54 (2011)
- Belarus: 8 (2009)

Languages
- Vepsian and Russian

Religion
- Predominantly Eastern Orthodox

Related ethnic groups
- Other Baltic Finns; Especially Karelians, Izhorians, Votians, Estonians, and Finns

The Veps, or Vepsians (Veps: vepsläižed), are a Baltic Finnic people who speak the Veps language, which belongs to the Finnic branch of the Uralic languages.

According to the 2002 Russian census, there were 8,240 Veps in Russia. Of the 281 Veps in Ukraine, 11 spoke Vepsian according to the 2001 Ukrainian census.

The self-designations of these people in various dialects are vepslaine, bepslaane, and (in northern dialects, southwest of Lake Onega) lüdinik and lüdilaine. Almost all Vepsians are fluent in Russian. The younger generation, in general, does not speak Vepsian; however, many have an understanding of the language.

== History ==
=== Prehistory ===
Archeological and linguistic studies suggest that Vepsians lived in the valleys of the Sheksna, the Suda, and the Syas rivers, developing, according to Kalevi Wiik, from the proto-Vepsian Kargopol culture to the east of Lake Onega. They probably also lived in East Karelia and on the northern coast of Lake Onega. It is possible that the earliest mention of the Veps dates to the sixth century CE, when the Gothic historian Jordanes mentioned a people called Vasina broncas, which may have indicated the Vepsians. One of the eastern routes on which the Vikings went through their area, and the bjarm people mentioned by the Vikings as inhabiting the coast of the White Sea may have referred to the Veps. Evidence from tombs proves that they had contact with Staraya Ladoga, Finland and Meryans, other Volga Finnic tribes and later with the Principality of Novgorod and other Russian states. Later Vepsians also inhabited the western and eastern shores of Onega.

=== Later history ===
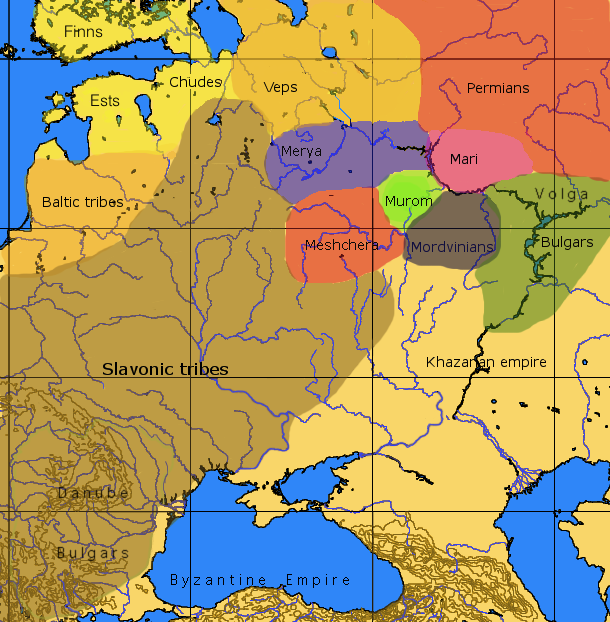
Vepsians and other tribes. An approximative map of the non-Varangian cultures in Eastern Europe, in the 9th century.

In medieval Russian chronicles, they are known as ves (весь); in some Arabic sources, they are called Wisu. It is assumed that Bjarmians were at least partly Vepsians. From the 12th century, their history is connected with first Novgorod and then Muscovy. Russian settlement reached the Onega Veps in the 14th or 15th century. Eastern Vepsians in the Kargopol area merged linguistically with the Russians before the 20th century.

The existence of the Vepsian people was not widely known until the mid-19th century. Despite its close relationship to the Karelian and the Finnish languages, the Vepsian language was thus one of the last Uralic languages to be recognized.

Vepsians numbered 25,607 in 1897. Some 7,300 of them inhabited East Karelia. In the beginning of the 20th century, there were some signs of national awakening among Vepsians. Early Soviet nationality politics supported this progress, and 24 administrative units with the status of national village soviets were formed. The alphabet and the written language were developed. Teachers started to instruct in Vepsian in some elementary schools. The Soviet authorities started to oppress the Vepsian culture in 1937. All national activities were stopped and the national districts were abolished. When Finland invaded East Karelia in the Continuation War, some Vepsians joined the so-called Kindred Battalion of the Finnish Army. These troops were relinquished to the Soviet Union after the war.

In the post-war period, many Veps moved from their historic villages to larger cities. In 1983, on the initiative of national academics, an inquiry was carried out which showed that there were nearly 13,000 Veps in the Soviet Union, 5,600 of whom lived in Karelia, 4,000 in the Leningrad region and just under a 1,000 in the Vologda region. The new Vepsian primer Abekirj and other elementary school books were published in Petrozavodsk in 1991. Kodima, a newspaper in Vepsian, has been published since 1993. The Vepsian rural community was formed in East Karelia in 1994, encompassing 8,200 square kilometers of land and 3,373 inhabitants, 42% of them Vepsian. The authorities of the Republic of Karelia granted some budgetary autonomy to the Vepsian community in 1996. The language was taught as a subject in two schools, in Shyoltozero and Rybreka. However, the cultural revival slowed in the second half of the 1990s and the federal authorities abolished the autonomy in 2006. Nowadays the younger generation in general does not speak the language.

== Geography ==
In modern times, they live in the area between Lake Ladoga, Lake Onega and Lake Beloye — in the Russian Republic of Karelia in the former Veps National Volost, in Leningrad Oblast along the Oyat River in the Podporozhsky and Lodeynopolsky Districts and further south in the Tikhvinsky and Boksitogorsky Districts, and in Vologda Oblast in the Vytegorsky and Babayevsky Districts.

== Demographics ==
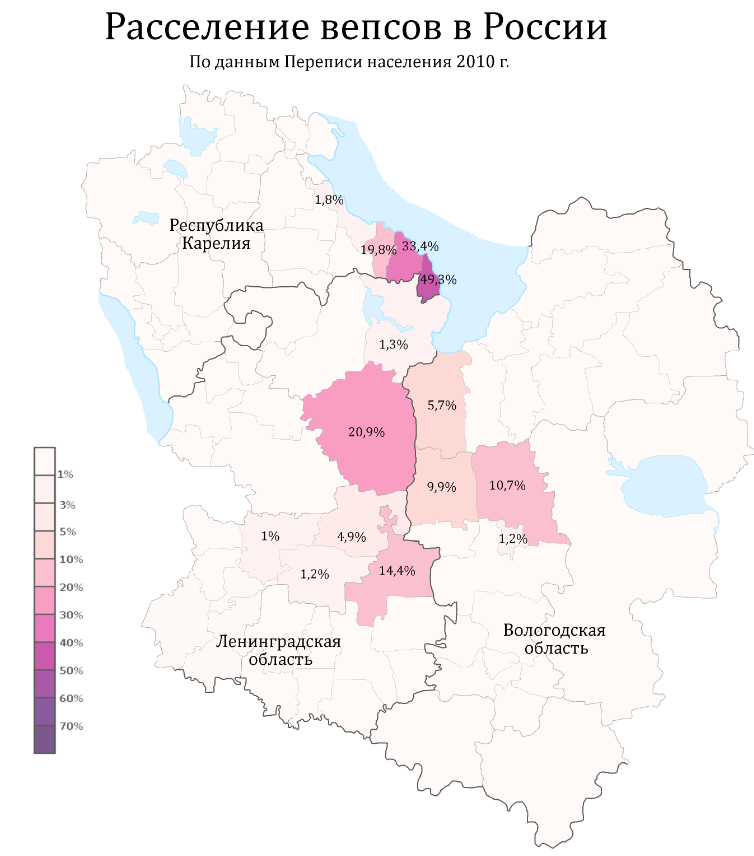
Settlement of Vepsians in the Republic of Karelia, Leningrad Oblast and Vologda Oblast by urban and rural settlements in %, 2010 census.

Census	Population	Change (%)
1897	25,607	0%
1926	32,800	+28%
1937	29,500	-10%
1939	31,500	+6.7%
1959	16,400	-47.9%
1970	8,000	-51.2%
1979	8,000	0%
1989	12,501	+56.2%
2002	8,240	-34%
2010	5,936	-27.9%
2021	4,534	-23.6%

== Language ==
The Vepsian is a language belonging to the Northern Finnic branch of the Uralic languages, it is divided into three dialects:

- Northern Veps (spoken in the Prionezhsky District in the Republic of Karelia);
- Central Veps (spoken in the central parts of Podporozhsky District in the Leningrad Oblast and Babayevsky District in the Vologda Oblast);
- Southern Veps (spoken in the southern parts of Podporozhsky District in the Leningrad Oblast and Babayevsky District in the Vologda Oblast);

A number of Veps live outside the historical Vepsian Upland, mostly in other cities in the Republic of Karelia, Saint Petersburg and Moscow.

== Genetics ==
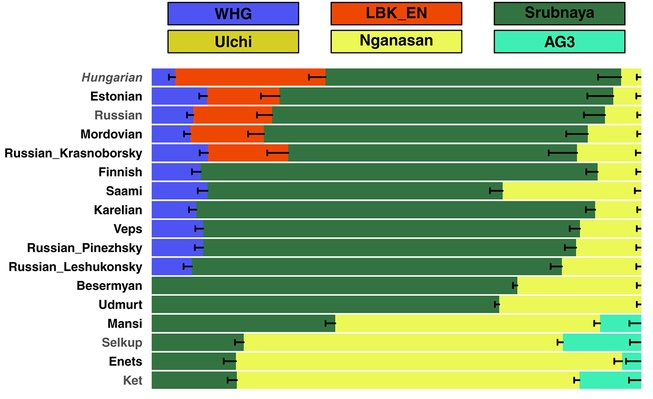
Estimated ancestry components among selected Eurasian populations, including Vepsians.

Vepsians cluster with Karelians and Finns. They share most of their autosomal ancestry with Europeans, but about 12% of their ancestry is Nganasan-like. This Siberian-related component is linked to the spread of Uralic languages. Like other Baltic Finnic peoples, Vepsians have a high Steppe-related admixture.

Vepsians share more IBD (identity-by-descent) segments with several Uralic-speaking populations, including geographically distant ones like the Mansis and the Nganasans, than with Russians or other non-Uralic groups near to them. This is consistent with the idea that the Uralic-speaking peoples share some common roots. They have significant IBD segment sharing with the Turkic-speaking Dolgans from Siberia, too.

The most common maternal haplogroups among Vepsians include H (57.6%) and U5 (16.8%), showing similarity with other Baltic Finnic groups. In Tambets et al, 2018, 56.4% of Vepsian men have the haplogroup N, which is of Uralic origin and commonly found among Uralic-speaking populations. 38.5% belong to the subclade N1a1a (M178), which is typical for Finno-Ugric groups near them, and 17.9% have the subclade N-P43, common in more eastern Uralic groups. The second most common Y-DNA haplogroup among the Veps is R1a (35.9%). The paternal lineages of the Veps may have been influenced by the Zavoloch Chuds, who are thought to have possibly mixed with them. A 2024 paper found Veps had the lineages of N2a, N3a3 and N3a4 as about 30% of their y-DNA, along with an enrichment of I1.

== Notable Vepsians ==
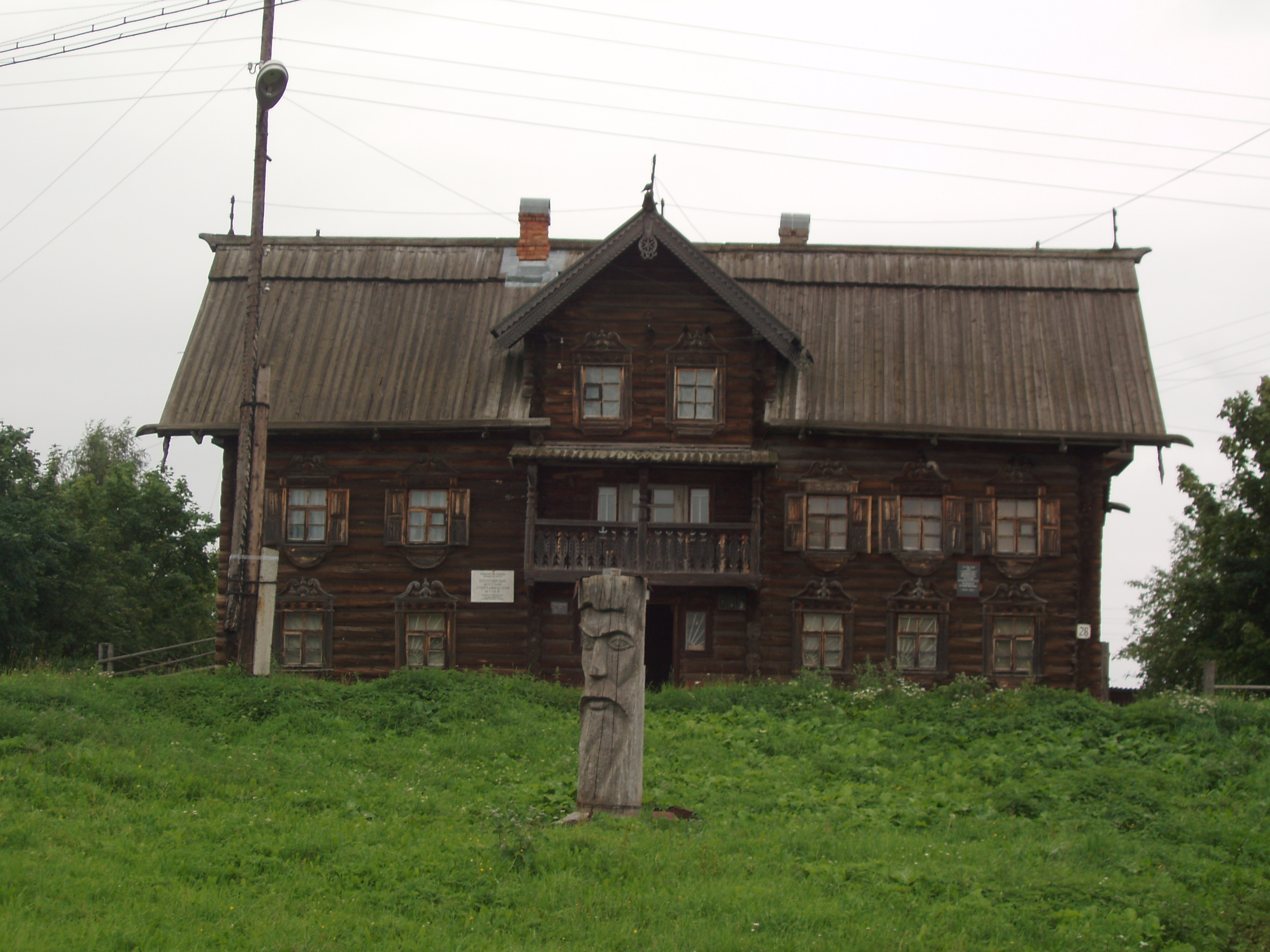
Vepsian Museum in Shyoltozero, Republic of Karelia, Russia

- Nikolay Abramov (1961–2016) – Vepsian-language poet, translator and writer
- Ivan Golunov (born 1983) — Russian investigative journalist and anti-corruption reporter
- Raisa Lardot (born 1938), Veps-born Finnish writer
- Anna Lisitsyna (1922–1942), Soviet partisan, Hero of the Soviet Union
- Ryurik Lonin (1930–2009), collector of Veps folklore and writer
- Alexander Svirsky (1448–1533), Eastern Orthodox saint
- Nina Zaitseva (born 1946) — Linguist, Doctor of Philology and Honoured Scientist of the Republic of Karelia (1995)
- Zinaida Strogalshchikova (born 1948) — Ethnographer, public figure, and journalist

== Sources ==
- Grünthal, Riho (2022). "Veps". In Bakró-Nagy, Marianne; Laakso, Johanna; Skribnik, Elena (eds.). The Oxford Guide to the Uralic Languages. Oxford University Press. ISBN 978-0-19-876766-4.
