= Mariya Melentyeva =

Soviet Karelian partisan (1924–1943)

Mariya Vladimirovna Melentyeva
- Мария Владимировна Мелентьева
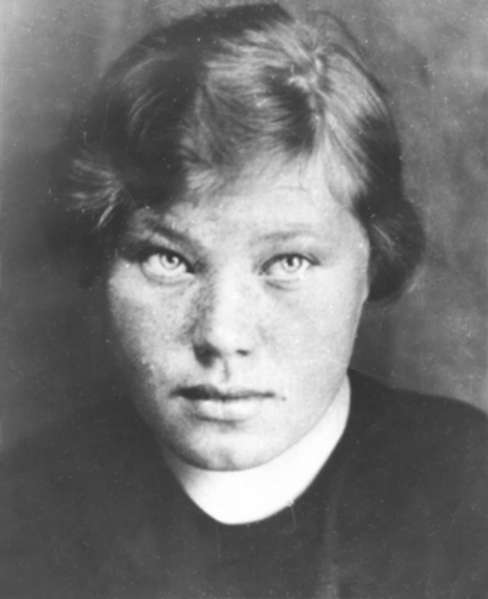
- Born: 24 January 1924; Pryazha, Karelia
- Died: 2 July 1943 (aged 19); Topornaya Gora, Medvezhyegorsky District, Karelian ASSR
- Awards: Hero of the Soviet Union; Order of Lenin; Order of the Red Star

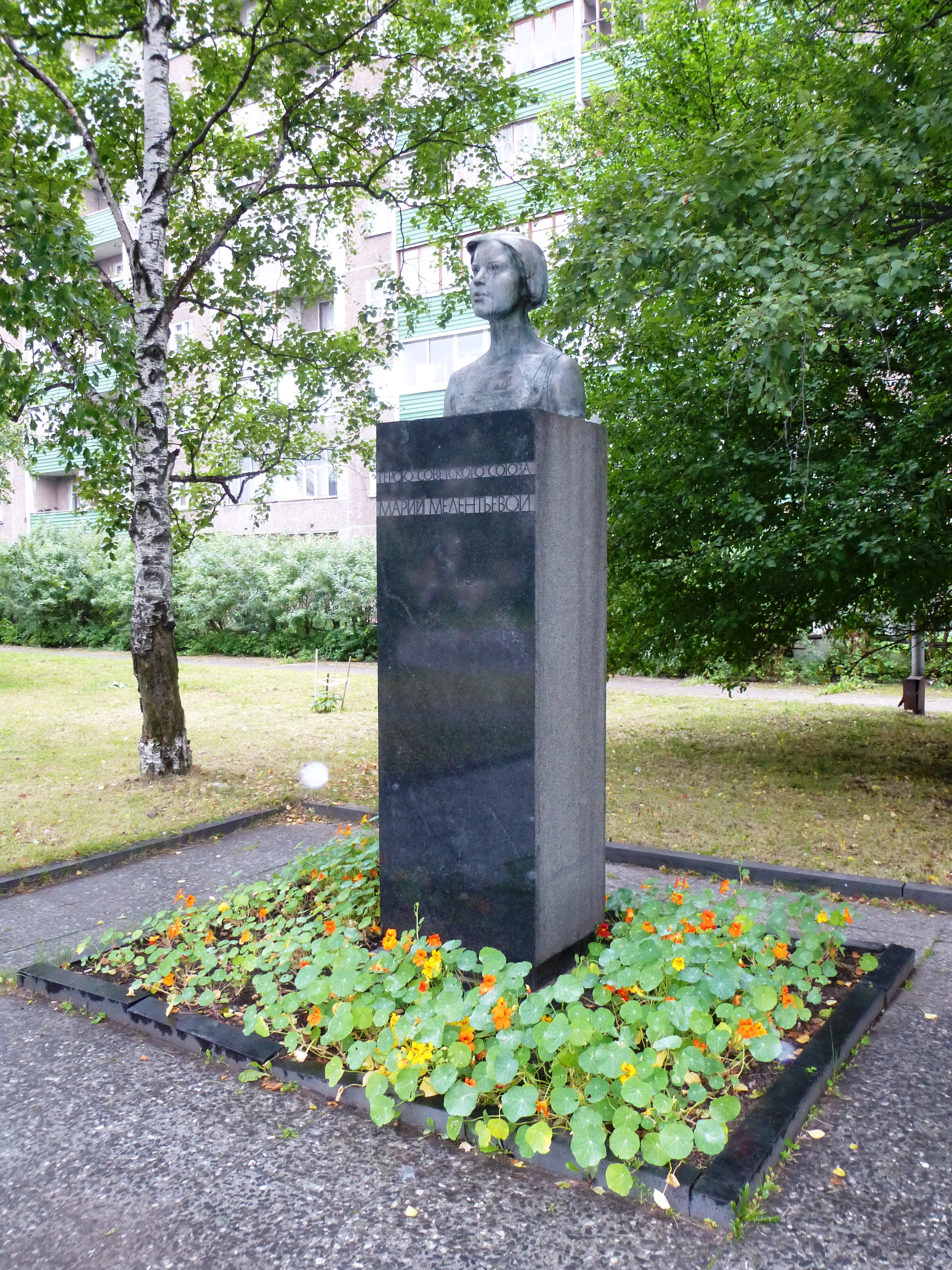
Bust of Melentyeva in Petrozavodsk

Mariya Vladimirovna Melentyeva (Russian: Мари́я Влади́мировна Меле́нтьева; 24 January 1924 – 2 July 1943) was a Soviet partisan from Karelia who was posthumously awarded the title Hero of the Soviet Union on 25 September 1943 for her resistance activities.

== Early life ==
Melentyeva was born on 24 January 1924 to a Karelian peasant family in the village of Pryazha. After graduating from secondary school in her village and completing nursing courses she worked as a nurse in a hospital in Segezha. She was an athletic person and enjoyed various sports, much like her future colleague Anna Lisitsyna.

== Partisan activities ==
Melentyeva's partisan activities began in 1942. On 15 June Melentyeva went with fellow partisan Anna Lisitsyna and six other Komsomol members to Sheltozersky district, which was controlled by the Axis in order to conduct a reconnaissance-in-force mission and establish an underground Komsomol organization. When the plane that was supposed to bring the partisans back to friendly territory could not come the eight were told they would have to walk on foot across enemy lines to hand over documents containing the information they had gathered on the locations of Axis garrisons and names of individuals that were fighting for the Axis. During the crossing of the icy Svir River on 3 August 1942 her friend Anna Lisitsyna drowned, but Melentyeva managed to recover the documents Lisitsyna was carrying in her hat. Alone, Melentyeva wandered through the forest for five days without clothes, shoes, or food, carrying only the bundle of documents with her. On the sixth day she encountered the 272nd Infantry Regiment of the Red Army and was able to hand over the documents.

In the summer of 1943 she was sent on another mission inside Axis-controlled territory; she was supposed to make contact with underground Komsomol committee she had helped establish in Sheltozersky and report back any information they had. After an informant had reported their activities to the Finnish military a standoff ensued, with Melentyeva firing on surrounding Finnish forces until she and the other surviving partisans were captured and taken prisoner. After refusing to answer the Finnish military's questions the partisans were shot at point-blank range inside a cellar on 2 July 1943. They were later buried in Topornaya Gora, Medvezhyegorsky District.

== Recognition ==
Melentyeva was posthumously awarded the title Hero of the Soviet Union on 25 September 1943 by decree of the Supreme Soviet, the same day as Anna Lisitsyna. She was also a recipient of the Order of the Red Star. Her image is featured in the Petrozavodsk Gallery of Heroes, a street in Karelia was named in her honor, and there are several monuments and memorials to her throughout Karelia.

== See also ==
- List of female Heroes of the Soviet Union
- Soviet partisans
