= Shyoltozero =

Shyoltozero Шёлтозеро Šoutjärv’ (Veps)
- Selo
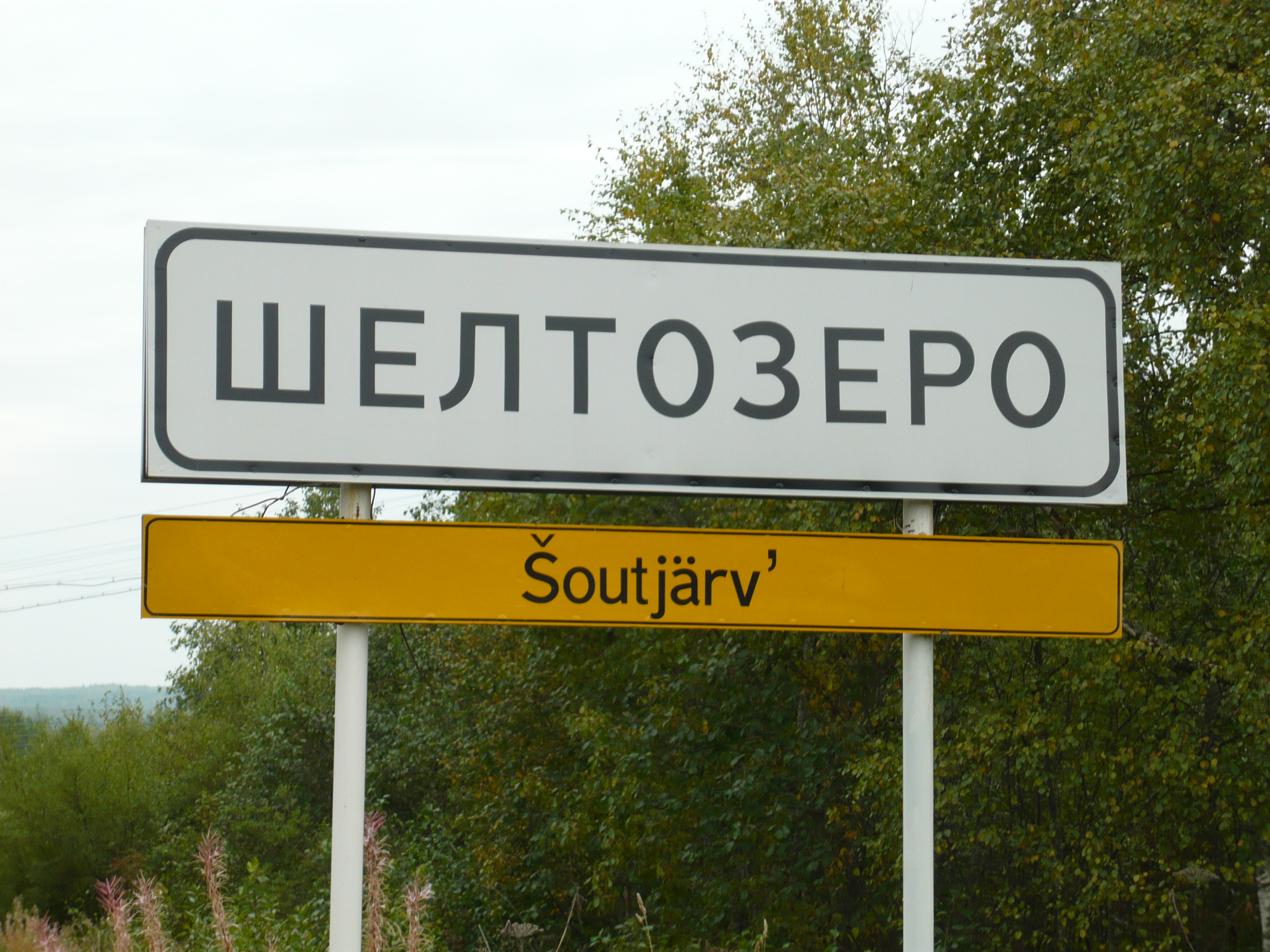
- A sign on the P–19 Highway at the entrance to Shyoltozero, with the name in Russian and in Veps
- Interactive map of Shyoltozero
- Location of Shyoltozero Shyoltozero (Karelia)
- Coordinates: 61°22′15″N 35°21′29″E
- Country: Russia
- Federal subject: Republic of Karelia
- Administrative district: Prionezhsky District
- First mentioned: 1453

Population
  - Estimate (2021): 915 )

Municipal status
  - Municipal district: Prionezhsky Municipal District
  - Rural settlement: Shyoltozerskoye Rural Settlement
  - Capital of: Shyoltozerskoye Rural Settlement
- Time zone: UTC+3 (UTC+03:00)
- Postal code: 185514
- OKTMO ID: 86636475101

Shyoltozero (Russian: Шёлтозеро, IPA: [ˈʂoltəzʲɪrə]; Veps: Šoutjärv’; Karelian: Šoutjärvi; Finnish: Soutjärvi) is a rural locality (a selo) in Prionezhsky District of the Republic of Karelia, Russia, located close to the shore of Lake Onega, 84 kilometers (52 mi) south of Petrozavodsk, the capital of the republic. Shyoltozero is the cultural center of the north Veps people, and during 1994–2004 it was the territorial center of Veps National Volost.

== Etymology ==
In the place name Šoutjärv’ one can see the sound change *l > u, which has occurred in Veps throughout (cf. Finn. kolme ~ Veps koum ‘three’). When considered together with the testimony of old Russian maps, it is clear that the earlier Veps name has been *Šoltjärvi. Thus this place name has nothing to do with the Finnish word soutaa (‘to row’), and the frequently used Finnish form Soutjärvi is based on an incorrect etymology.

== History ==
Shyoltozero was mentioned for the first time in 1453 by the Archbishop of Novgorod. Originally it was situated 6 kilometers (3.7 mi) to the southwest of the present location, by the lake which on older Russian maps is showns as Shyoltozero. At some point, the inhabitants moved to where Shyoltozero is now located, while the original site became known as Kodijär’v (Veps for "home lake").

Before the 1920s, Shyoltozero and neighboring villages formed the Shyoltozero pogost, which was a part of Petrozavodsky Uyezd. With the advent of the Soviet state, the pogost became a part of Shyoltozero District, which was dissolved in 1957 and became a part of Prionezhsky District.

During the post-Soviet era, Shyoltozero functioned as the territorial center of Veps National Volost, which existed in 1994–2004. After the volost was dissolved, its inhabited localities became directly subordinated to Prionezhsky District. Municipally, they became a part of Sheltozerskoye Veps Rural Settlement within Prionezhsky Municipal District.

== Demographics ==
During the 2002 Census, it was reported that the population was 1,039, but in a study conducted in the mid-1990s, it was found that the population was ca. 970, of which 61% were Veps or of Veps descent, 7% were other Baltic Finnic ethnicities, and 32% were Russians and other East Slavic ethnicities.

== Culture ==
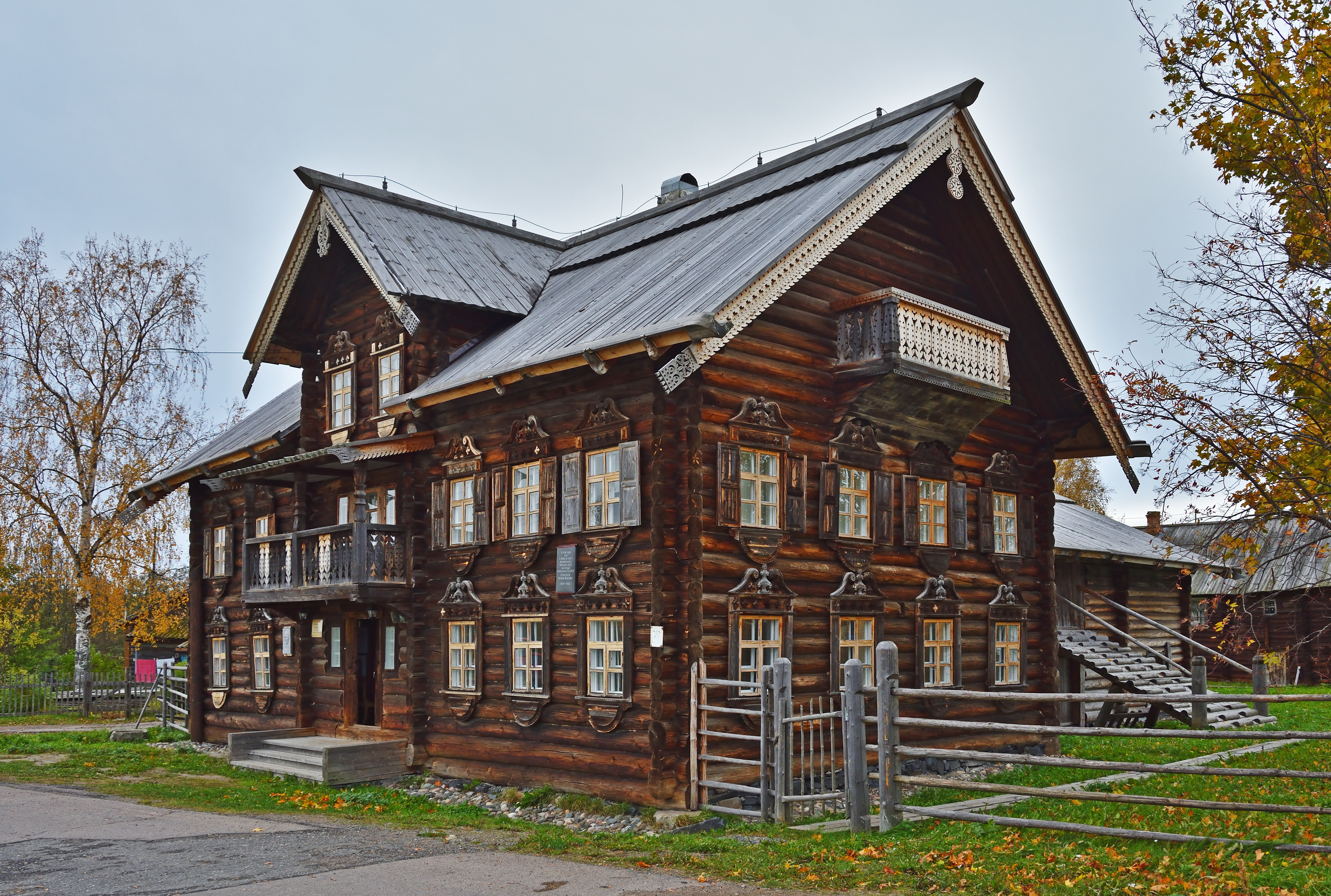
Lonin Museum of Veps Ethnography in Shyoltozero

The Lonin Museum of Veps Ethnography in Shyltozero was founded in 1967 by a resident of Shyoltozero, sovkhoz worker Ryurik Lonin (1930–2009), who was originally from the village of Kaskesruchey. The museum was first housed in the library building, but then moved to a dedicated building. In the 1980s, the museum moved yet again, to its present location in a mid-19th-century building, which is considered to be a monument of Karelian wooden architecture.

The museum also includes the Tuchin House that is located behind the Melkin House. During the Continuation War, it was the home of Dmitry Tuchin and his wife Mariya, who accommodated Soviet partisans in their house. Also a woman of Finnish extraction, Sylvi Paaso, lived in this house for eight months and radioed information on the movements of the Finnish troops to the Soviet military. The novel The Operation in the Vacuum Zone by Oleg Tikhonov tells about this period.
