= Babayevo, Vladimir Oblast =

Babayevo Бабаево
- Selo
- Location within Vladimir Oblast Location within Russia
- Coordinates: 56°06′N 40°04′E
- Country: Russia
- Region: Vladimir Oblast
- District: Sobinsky District
- Time zone: UTC+3:00

Babayevo (Russian: Баба́ево) is a rural locality (a selo) in Vorshinskoye Rural Settlement, Sobinsky District, Vladimir Oblast, Russia. The population was 604 as of 2010. There are 23 streets.

== Geography ==
Babayevo is located 25 km northeast of Sobinka (the district's administrative centre) by road. Yerosovo is the nearest rural locality.
