= Babayevo, Vologda Oblast =

Town in Vologda Oblast, Russia

Babayevo Бабаево
- Town
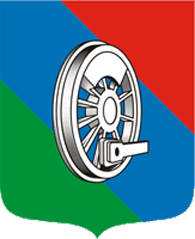
- Coat of arms
- Interactive map of Babayevo
- Location of Babayevo Babayevo (Vologda Oblast)
- Coordinates: 59°23′N 35°55′E
- Country: Russia
- Federal subject: Vologda Oblast
- Administrative district: Babayevsky District
- Town of district significanceSelsoviet: Babayevo
- First mentioned: 1545
- Town status since: 1925
- Elevation: 135 m (443 ft)

Population (2010 Census)
  - Total: 12,073
  - Estimate (2023): 11,646 (−3.5%)

Administrative status
  - Capital of: Babayevsky District, town of district significance of Babayevo

Municipal status
  - Municipal district: Babayevsky Municipal District
  - Urban settlement: Babayevo Urban Settlement
  - Capital of: Babayevsky Municipal District, Babayevo Urban Settlement
- Time zone: UTC+3 (MSK)
- Postal codes: 162480–162483, 162499
- OKTMO ID: 19605101001
- Website: gorodbabaevo.ru

Babayevo (Russian: Баба́ево) is a town and the administrative center of Babayevsky District in Vologda Oblast, Russia, located in the south of the district, on the Kolp River (Volga's basin) 246 kilometers (153 mi) west of Vologda, the administrative center of the oblast. Population: 12,073 (2010 census); 12,604 (2002 census); 14,211 (1989 Soviet census).

== History ==
It was first mentioned as a village in 1545. In 1882, a metallurgical plant, which produced telegraph wires, nails, and hooks, was built here. The railway station opened in 1901, boosting development. Before 1918, Babayevo was a part of Ustyuzhensky Uyezd of Novgorod Governorate. In June 1918, five uyezds of Novgorod Governorate, including Ustyuzhensky Uyezd, were split off to form Cherepovets Governorate, with the administrative center in Cherepovets. In 1925, Babayevo was granted town status. On August 1, 1927, Cherepovets Governorate was abolished and its territory became Cherepovets Okrug of Leningrad Oblast. At the same time, uyezds were abolished and Babayevsky District was established. Babayevo became the administrative center of the district. On September 23, 1937, Babayevsky District was transferred to newly established Vologda Oblast.

== Geography ==
=== Climate ===
Climate data for Babayevo
Month	Jan	Feb	Mar	Apr	May	Jun	Jul	Aug	Sep	Oct	Nov	Dec	Year
Record high °C (°F)	6.2 (43.2)	9.2 (48.6)	16.4 (61.5)	25.7 (78.3)	32.6 (90.7)	33.3 (91.9)	36.0 (96.8)	36.5 (97.7)	29.0 (84.2)	21.2 (70.2)	12.3 (54.1)	9.2 (48.6)	36.5 (97.7)
Mean daily maximum °C (°F)	−6.3 (20.7)	−5.1 (22.8)	1.1 (34.0)	9.1 (48.4)	17.0 (62.6)	21.1 (70.0)	23.5 (74.3)	20.8 (69.4)	14.4 (57.9)	7.0 (44.6)	−0.5 (31.1)	−4.3 (24.3)	8.2 (46.8)
Daily mean °C (°F)	−9.5 (14.9)	−8.8 (16.2)	−3.5 (25.7)	4.0 (39.2)	10.9 (51.6)	15.2 (59.4)	17.8 (64.0)	15.3 (59.5)	10.1 (50.2)	4.1 (39.4)	−2.8 (27.0)	−7.1 (19.2)	3.8 (38.8)
Mean daily minimum °C (°F)	−12.8 (9.0)	−12.5 (9.5)	−8.0 (17.6)	−1.2 (29.8)	4.7 (40.5)	9.3 (48.7)	12.0 (53.6)	9.9 (49.8)	5.7 (42.3)	1.2 (34.2)	−5.0 (23.0)	−9.9 (14.2)	−0.5 (31.1)
Record low °C (°F)	−47.6 (−53.7)	−40.2 (−40.4)	−33.1 (−27.6)	−21.8 (−7.2)	−6.3 (20.7)	−2.4 (27.7)	1.9 (35.4)	−1.6 (29.1)	−9.8 (14.4)	−19.1 (−2.4)	−32.5 (−26.5)	−37.3 (−35.1)	−47.6 (−53.7)
Average precipitation mm (inches)	41.3 (1.63)	31.2 (1.23)	33.1 (1.30)	31.7 (1.25)	51.3 (2.02)	73.3 (2.89)	79.0 (3.11)	82.3 (3.24)	59.3 (2.33)	60.0 (2.36)	53.0 (2.09)	50.1 (1.97)	645.6 (25.42)
Source: Погода Бабаево

== Administrative and municipal status ==
Within the framework of administrative divisions, Babayevo serves as the administrative center of Babayevsky District. As an administrative division, it is incorporated within Babayevsky District as the town of district significance of Babayevo.

As a municipal division, the town of district significance of Babayevo, together with four rural localities in Volodinsky Selsoviet of Babayevsky District, is incorporated within Babayevsky Municipal District as Babayevo Urban Settlement.

The Government of the Vologda Region merged the town and a rural settlement of the same name on 1 December 2021, abolishing the rural settlement and including it within the city limits.

== Economy ==
=== Industry ===
There are two dairy plants, an electrical engineering plant, and a furniture factory in the town.

=== Transportation ===
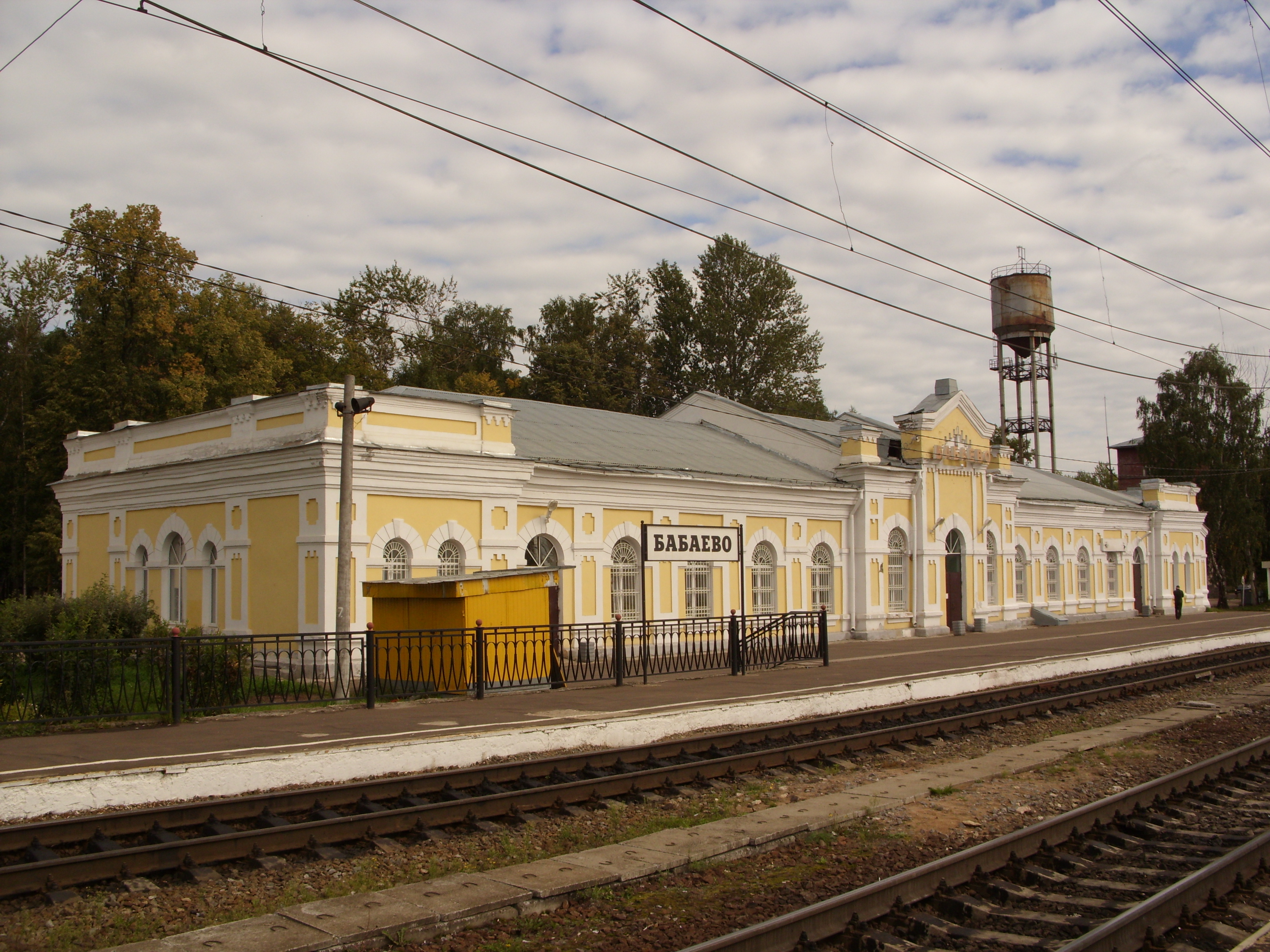
Babayevo railway station

In Babayevo, there is a station on the railway connecting Vologda to St. Petersburg via Cherepovets.

Babayevo has an all-season road connection south to Ustyuzhna and north to Borisovo-Sudskoye. There are no all-season through roads to Vytegorsky District, Belozersky District, or to Leningrad Oblast. There is bus traffic originating from Babayevo.

== Culture and recreation ==
The town is home to the Babayevsky District Museum, which opened in 1978 mostly due to the efforts of Mariya Gorbunova, a local teacher and later the head of the local education department. She became the first director of the museum. The museum currently is named after her.
