= Connegative =

Word form used in negative clauses

The connegative is a word form used in negative clauses. In the grammar of French, it refers to an obligatory negation marker such as pas in Je ne sais pas "I don't know". In the grammar of Finnish, it refers to a verb form consisting of an endingless stem (one of five infinitives of Finnish) used with a negative verb (used as an auxiliary verb) such as tiedä in en tiedä "I don't know". The connegative form also appears in Uralic languages such as Udmurt.

In the sciences, the connegative of a proposition is defined as negating both the premise and result which overall results in a new proposition.
