= Babayevsky District =

Babayevsky District Бабаевский район (Russian)
- District
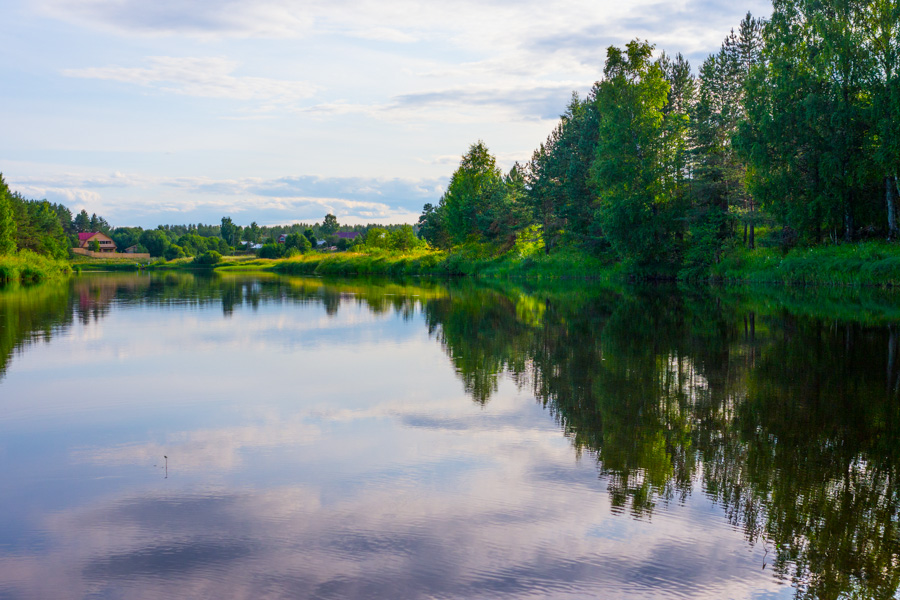
- Kolp River, Babayevsky District

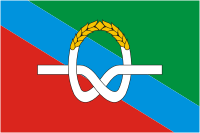
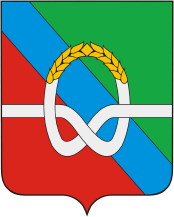
- Flag Coat of arms
- Location of Babayevsky District in Vologda Oblast
- Coordinates: 59°23′N 35°57′E
- Country: Russia
- Federal subject: Vologda Oblast
- Established: August 1, 1927
- Administrative center: Babayevo

Area
  - Total: 9,200 km^{2} (3,600 sq mi)

Population (2010 Census)
  - Total: 21,944
  - Density: 2.4/km^{2} (6.2/sq mi)
  - Urban: 55.0%
  - Rural: 45.0

Administrative structure
  - Administrative divisions: 1 Towns of district significance, 18 Selsoviets
  - Inhabited localities: 1 cities/towns, 276 rural localities

Municipal structure
  - Municipally incorporated as: Babayevsky Municipal District
  - Municipal divisions: 1 urban settlements, 10 rural settlements
- Time zone: UTC+3 (MSK)
- OKTMO ID: 19605000
- Website: http://www.babaevo-adm.ru/

Babayevsky District (Russian: Баба́евский район) is an administrative and municipal district (raion), one of the twenty-six in Vologda Oblast, Russia. It is located in the west of the oblast and borders with Vytegorsky District in the north, Belozersky District in the east, Kaduysky District in the southeast, Ustyuzhensky District in the south, Chagodoshchensky District in the southeast, and with Boksitogorsky, Tikhvinsky, and Podporozhsky Districts of Leningrad Oblast in the west. The area of the district is 9,200 square kilometers (3,600 sq mi) (the size of Cyprus). Its administrative center is the town of Babayevo. Population: 21,944 (2010 census); 24,930 (2002 Census); 29,535 (1989 Soviet census). The population of Babayevo accounts for 55.0% of the district's total population.

== Geography ==
The district is elongated from north to south. Almost the whole area of the district belongs to the basin of the Volga River and drains to the east. The main rivers within the district are the Shola (a tributary of Lake Beloye), the Suda and its major right tributary, the Kolp, a tributary of the Rybinsk Reservoir, and the Chagodoshcha, a left tributary of the Mologa. Minor areas in the northwest of the district belong to the basin of the Oyat River, a tributary of Lake Ladoga; and the Oyat itself has its source in the district. Thus, the divide between the basins of the Baltic Sea and the Caspian Sea crosses the district.

There are many lakes of glacial origin in the district, especially in the northwest. The biggest of them are Lake Linzhozero and Lake Pyazhozero, both located in the basin of the Suda, and Lake Sholskoye, the source of the Shola.

Rivers, lakes and swamps occupy a considerable part of the district's territory.

== History ==
Historically the area was sparsely populated by Finnic peoples, of whom the Vepsians, a few still living in the district, are the descendants. Although this area formally became a part of the Novgorod Republic and subsequently of the Principality of Beloozero, none of the villages located in the area were mentioned in any documents until the end of the 14th century. The first historic reference to "Suda land" is in Dmitry Donskoy's testament.

In the course of the administrative reform carried out in 1708 by Peter the Great, the area was included into Ingermanland Governorate (known since 1710 as Saint Petersburg Governorate). In 1727, a separate Novgorod Governorate was split off. The current area of the district was split between Belozersky Uyezd (north of the Kolp) and Ustyuzhensky Uyezd (south of the Kolp). In 1776, the area was transferred to Novgorod Viceroyalty. In 1796, the viceroyalty was abolished, and both uyezds were transferred to Novgorod Governorate. Babayevo, then a village, developed as a settlement around an iron production plant in the 19th century. Important historic route - St.Petersburg-Tikhvin-Belozersk tract - runs via this district and crosses the Suda River at Borisovo-Sudskoye. Borisovo-Sudskoye become important trading and fair location in the 19th century. Khvalevskoye Manor is located here, a country seat of Russian noble family Kachalov.

After Bolshevik revolution, in June 1918 five uyezds of Novgorod Governorate, including Belozersky and Ustyuzhensky Uyezds, were split off to form Cherepovets Governorate, with the administrative center in Cherepovets. In 1925, Babayevo was granted town status. On August 1, 1927, Cherepovets Governorate was abolished, and its area became Cherepovets Okrug of Leningrad Oblast. Simultaneously, the uyezds were abolished and Babayevsky District was established. On September 23, 1937, Babayevsky District was transferred to newly established Vologda Oblast.

On August 1, 1927, Borisovo-Sudsky District with the administrative center in the selo of Borisovo-Sudskoye and Oshtinsky District with the administrative center in the selo of Oshta were also established. Borisovo-Sudsky District was a part of Cherepoivets Okrug of Leningrad Oblast, whereas Oshtinsky District was a part of Lodeynoye Pole Okrug of Leningrad Oblast. In 1937, both were transferred from Leningrad Oblast to Vologda Oblast. On December 12, 1955, Oshtinsky District was abolished. The area of Oshtinsky District was split between Vytegorsky and Borisovo-Sudsky Districts. In 1959, Borisovo-Sudsky District was abolished as well and merged into Babayevsky District.

== Demographics ==
Babayevsky District is one of the areas traditionally populated by Vepsians, although now representing less than 1,000 people or less than 5% of total district's population according to the latest census. The Vepsians living in the district speak the central group of Veps dialects.

== Economy ==
=== Industry ===
The economy of the district is based on timber industry. There is also food industry, including butter manufacturing.

=== Agriculture ===
Fourteen large- and mid-scale farms and a number of small farms operate in the district, producing mainly meat, milk, and linum.

=== Transportation ===
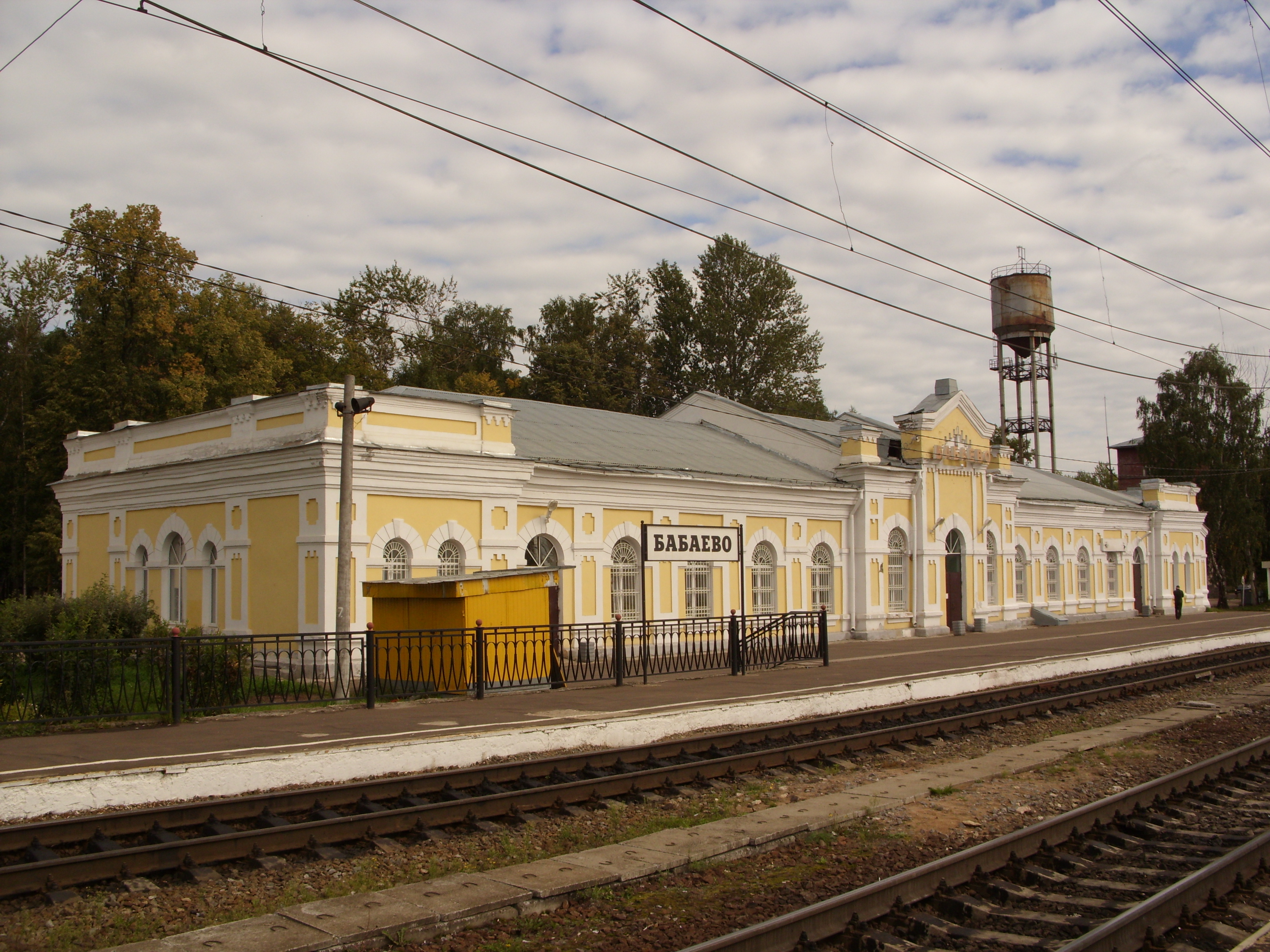
Babayevo railway station

The railroad connecting Vologda to Saint Petersburg via Cherepovets crosses the southern part of the district from east to west. The main railway station within the district is Babayevo.

Babayevo has an all-season road connection south to Ustyuzhna and north to Borisovo-Sudskoye. There are no all-season through roads to Vytegorsky District, Belozersky District, or to Leningrad Oblast.

== Culture and recreation ==
The district contains one archaeological monument of federal significance which is a group of tumuli near the village of Stepanovo.

The Babayevsky District Museum is located in Babayevo. The museum opened in 1978 mostly due to the efforts of Mariya Gorbunova, a local teacher and later the head of the local education department. The museum is named after her.

The historic site of Khvalevskoe Manor is located in the village of Borisovo-Sudskoye.
