= Babayevo, Kaltasinsky District, Republic of Bashkortostan =

Babayevo Бабаево
- Village
- Location within Bashkortostan Location within Russia
- Coordinates: 55°53′N 55°02′E
- Country: Russia
- Region: Bashkortostan
- District: Kaltasinsky District
- Time zone: UTC+5:00

Babayevo (Russian: Бабаево; Bashkir: Бабай, Babay) is a rural locality (a village) in Kalmiyabashevsky Selsoviet, Kaltasinsky District, Bashkortostan, Russia. The population was 336 as of 2010. There are 7 streets.

== Geography ==
Babayevo is located 24 km southeast of Kaltasy (the district's administrative centre) by road. Vasilovo is the nearest rural locality.
