= Veps National Volost =

Former administrative territorial entity of Russia

Coordinates: 61°22′15″N 35°21′29″E

Veps National Volost Ве́псская национа́льная во́лость (Russian) Vepsän rahvahaline volost’ (Veps)
- Volost of the Russian Federation
- 1994/1996-2004
- Flag (2000-2004)

- The Veps National Volost within the Prionezhsky District
- Capital: Shyoltozero
- Population
  - 2002: 3,166
- History
  - Established: 2 December 1996
  - Disestablished: 1 December 2004

Veps National Volost (Russian: Ве́псская национа́льная во́лость, Vepsskaya natsionalnaya volost; Veps: Vepsän rahvahaline volost’) was a municipal autonomy (a volost) of North Vepses in the Prionezhsky District of the Republic of Karelia, Russia during 1996-2004. Its capital was the village of Shyoltozero.

== History ==
The autonomy was declared as a self-governing territory on January 20, 1994, and, after resolving various territorial and administrative controversies, it was established as an administrative unit on December 2, 1996. Its territorial and administrative centre was the village (selo) of Shyoltozero. At the moment of formation it comprized of 14 settlements.. One of them, Zalesye, had population of 1 and soon was disestablished).

By January 1, 1998, its population was 3,552, with 1,559 being Vepses. By the 2002 Census the volost's population was 3,166, with Veps population of 1,202. The volost extended over the same territory as the Shyoltozero District from the 1930s to the 1950s.

The volost was formed from three national selsoviets: Shyoltozero, Shoksha, and Rybreka which comprised thirteen villages (earlier established, by formal renaming them from "selsoviets" to "national selsoviets" in 1992-1993).

It was disestablished on December 1, 2004. After its disestablishment, within the territory three rural municipalities were established: the Shokshinskoye Veps Rural Settlement, the Sheltozerskoye Veps Rural Settlement and the Ryboretskoye Veps Rural Settlement, all subordinated back to Prionezhsky District.

In 2005 there was a sizzled attempt to restore the volost within the framework of the planned 2006 administrative reform in Russia.
