= Babayevo, Mishkinsky District, Republic of Bashkortostan =

Selo in Mishkinsky District, Bashkortostan, Russia

Babayevo Бабаево
- Selo
- Location within Bashkortostan Location within Russia
- Coordinates: 55°30′N 56°07′E
- Country: Russia
- Region: Bashkortostan
- District: Mishkinsky District
- Time zone: UTC+5:00

Babayevo (Russian: Бабаево; Bashkir: Бабай, Babay) is a rural locality (a village) in Kameyevsky Selsoviet, Mishkinsky District, Bashkortostan, Russia. The population was 190 as of 2010. There are 5 streets.

== Geography ==
Babayevo is located 18 km southeast of Mishkino (the district's administrative centre) by road. Nikolayevka is the nearest rural locality.
