= Ingrians =

Ingrians may refer to:

- Izhorians, traditionally Eastern Orthodox Finnic-speaking indigenous people of Ingria
- Ingrian Finns, the descendants of Lutheran emigrants from present-day Finland who settled in Ingria in 17th century
- Inhabitants of Ingria in general
