= Babeyevo, Republic of Mordovia =

Rural locality in Temnikovsky District, Mordovia, Russia

Coordinates: 54°34′09″N 43°13′05″E

Babeyevo (Russian: Бабе́ево) is a village (selo) in Temnikovsky District of the Republic of Mordovia, Russia.
