= Prionezhsky District =

Prionezhsky District Прионежский район (Russian)
- District
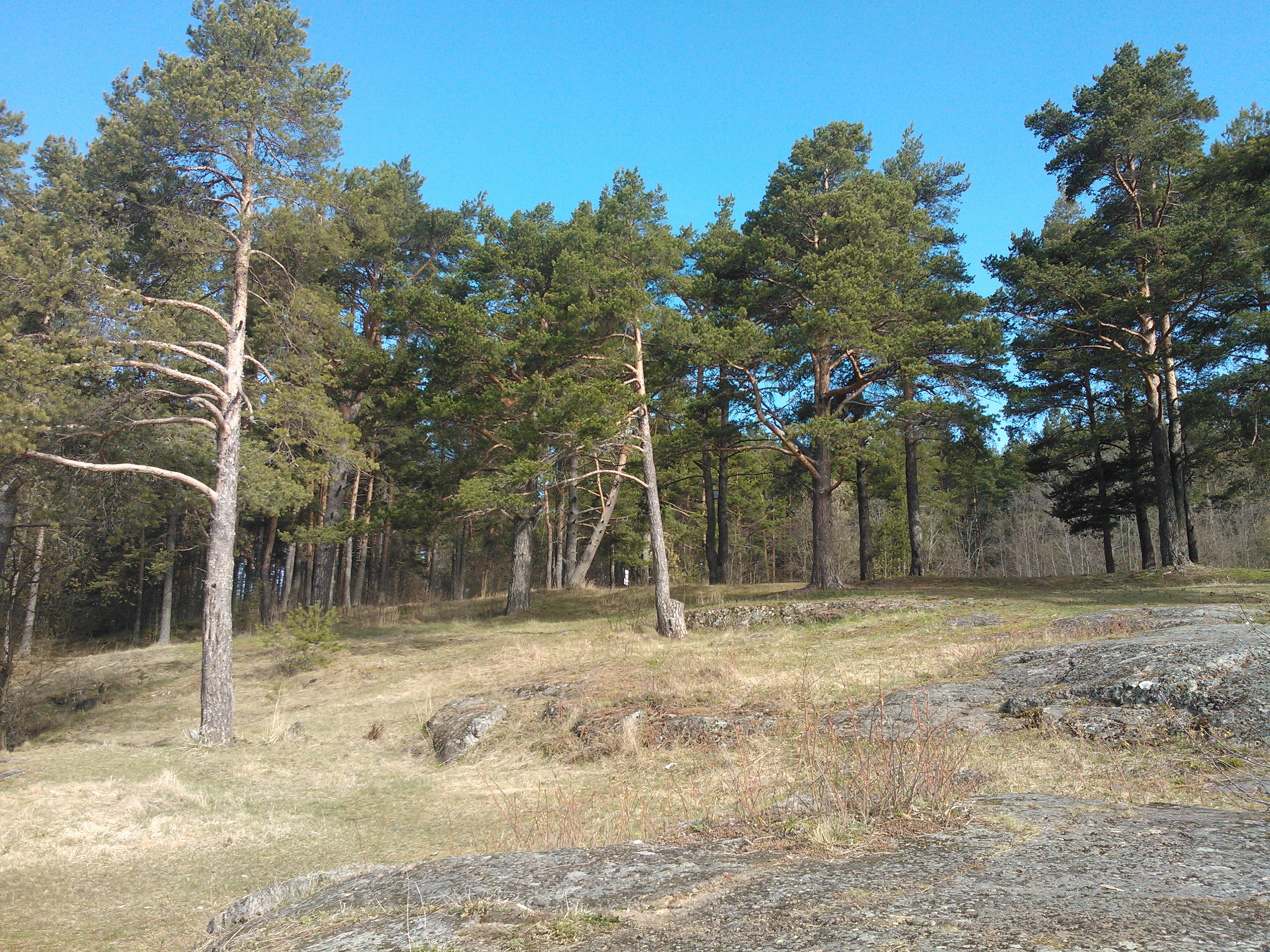
- "Devil's Chair", a natural monument and a protected area of Russia in Prionezhsky District

- Flag Coat of arms
- Location of Prionezhsky District in the Republic of Karelia
- Coordinates: 61°47′N 34°23′E
- Country: Russia
- Federal subject: Republic of Karelia
- Established: 29 August 1927
- Administrative center: Petrozavodsk

Area
  - Total: 3,665 km^{2} (1,415 sq mi)

Population (2010 Census)
  - Total: 21,502
  - Density: 5.867/km^{2} (15.20/sq mi)
  - Urban: 0%
  - Rural: 100%

Administrative structure
  - Inhabited localities: 51 rural localities

Municipal structure
  - Municipally incorporated as: Prionezhsky Municipal District
  - Municipal divisions: 0 urban settlements, 13 rural settlements
- Time zone: UTC+3 (UTC+03:00)
- OKTMO ID: 86636000
- Website: https://prionego.ru/

Population of Prionezhsky District
- 2010 Census: 21,502
- 2002 Census: 18,597
- 1989 Census: 25,439
- 1979 Census: 23,562

Prionezhsky District (Russian: Прионе́жский райо́н; Karelian: Prionežjen piiri; Veps: Änižröunan rajon; Livvi: Oniegan rannikon piiri) is an administrative district (raion), one of the fifteen in the Republic of Karelia, Russia. It is located in the southeast of the republic. The area of the district is 3,665 square kilometers (1,415 sq mi). Its administrative center is the city of Petrozavodsk (which is not administratively a part of the district). As of the 2010 Census, the total population of the district was 21,502.

== Administrative and municipal status ==
Within the framework of administrative divisions, Prionezhsky District is one of the fifteen in the Republic of Karelia and has administrative jurisdiction over all of its fifty-one rural localities. The city of Petrozavodsk serves as its administrative center, despite being incorporated separately as a city of republic significance—an administrative unit with the status equal to that of the districts.

As a municipal division, the district is incorporated as Prionezhsky Municipal District. Its fifty-one rural localities are incorporated into thirteen rural settlements within the municipal district. The city of republic significance of Petrozavodsk is incorporated separately from the district as Petrozavodsky Urban Okrug, but serves as the administrative center of the municipal district as well.
