= Veps language =

Finnic language south of Lake Onega, Russia

Veps
- vepsän kelʹ
- Native to: Russia
- Region: Karelia (Veps National Volost); Leningrad Oblast; Vologda Oblast
- Ethnicity: 5,900 Veps (2010 census)
- Native speakers: 1,300 (2020 census)
- Language family: Uralic: Finnic; Northern Finnic; Veps
- Writing system: Latin (Vepsian alphabet)

Official status
- Recognised minority language in: Russia: Karelia

Language codes
- ISO 639-3: vep
- Glottolog: veps1250
- ELP: Veps
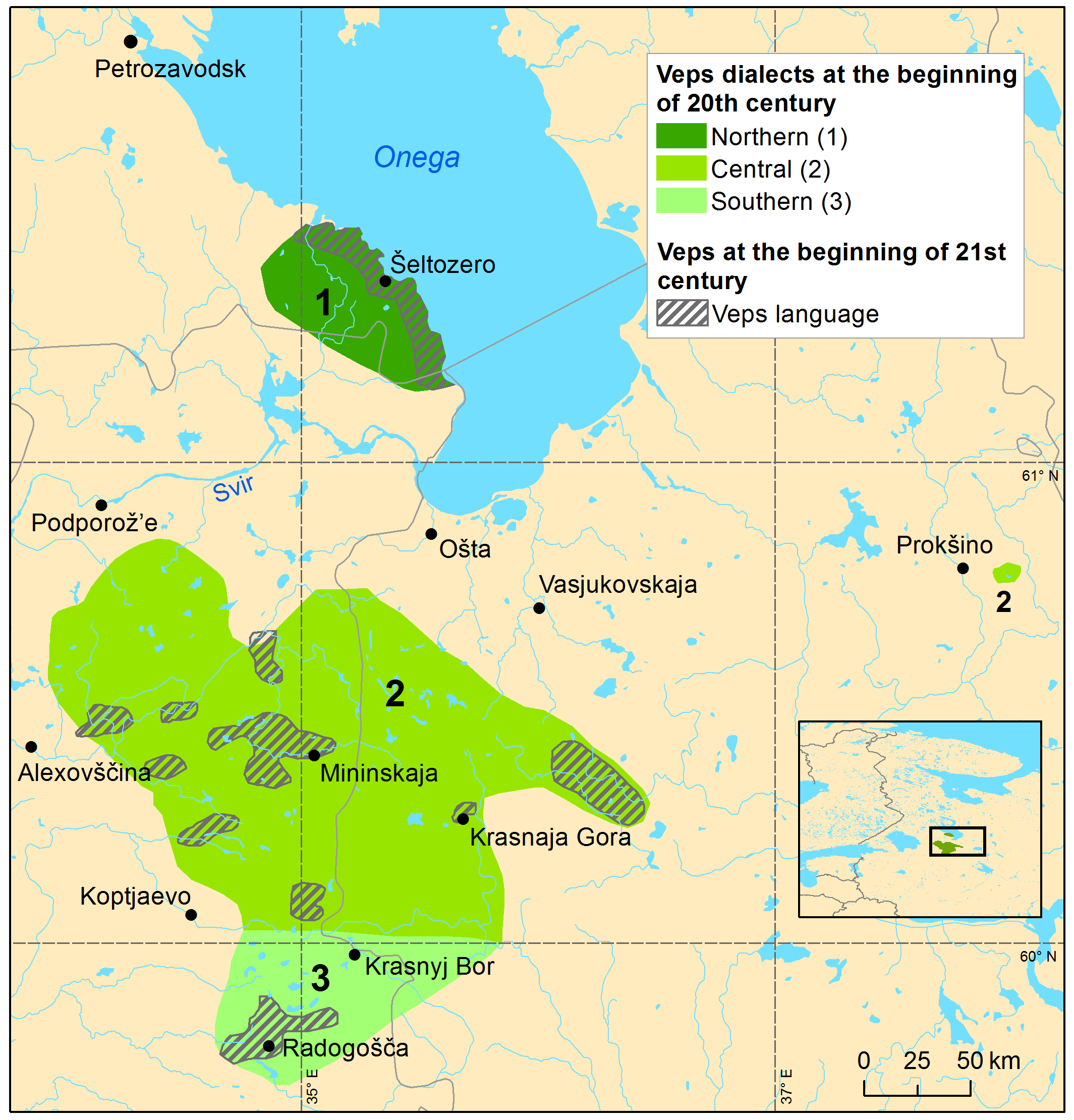
- Distribution of Veps at the beginning of the 20th and 21st centuries

- Veps is classified as Severely Endangered by the UNESCO Atlas of the World's Languages in Danger (2010).

Veps, also known as Vepsian (Veps: vepsän kelʹ, vepsän keli, or vepsä), is an endangered Finnic language from the Uralic language family, that is spoken by Vepsians. The language is written in the Latin script, and is closely related to Finnish and Karelian.

According to Soviet statistics, 12,500 people were self-designated ethnic Veps at the end of 1989. There were 5,900 self-designated ethnic Veps in 2010, and around 3,600 native speakers.

According to the location of the people, the language is divided into three main dialects: Northern Veps (at Lake Onega to the south of Petrozavodsk, to the north of the river Svir, including the former Veps National Volost), Central Veps (in the east of the Leningrad Oblast and northwest of the Vologda Oblast), and Southern Veps (in the Leningrad Oblast). The Northern dialect seems the most distinct of the three; however, it is still mutually intelligible for speakers of the other two dialects. Speakers of the Northern dialect call themselves "Ludi" (lüdikad), or lüdilaižed.

In Russia, more than 350 children were learning the Veps language in a total of five national schools in 2004.

== Classification and history ==
Nina Zaitseva speaks about the Veps language and the VepKar corpus. See subtitles in Veps language. KarRC RAS, 2018.

Flag of the Vepsian people

Veps is the easternmost surviving member of the Finnic languages. Having developed in relative isolation, the language lacks several features found in its relatives, such as consonant gradation and the length contrast in consonants. Original vowel length has mostly been lost as well (with the exception of Northern Veps, which retains ii and uu). At the same time, it retains a number of archaic features.

The closest relative of Veps is Ludic, connecting Veps to the wider Finnic dialect continuum.

Veps also shows some characteristic innovations such as the vocalization of original syllable-final *l, and the expansion of the local case system.

Birch bark letter no. 292 is the first known document in any Finnic language; it is considered to be closest to modern Karelian or Veps. The document was discovered near Novgorod in Russia and is dated to the early 13th century.

== Distribution ==
According to Ethnologue there were 3,160 speakers of Veps in 2010, located in the Republic of Karelia and in the Leningrad and Vologda Oblasts.

== Dialects ==
Veps shows substantial dialectal variation, affecting both phonetics and grammatical features. Three main dialect areas can be distinguished, the northern, central and southern dialects.

=== Northern ===
Northern Veps is spoken in the Republic of Karelia along the coast of Lake Onega south of Petrozavodsk. It is also spoken in a few small villages in Leningrad Oblast. Villages speaking Northern Veps include Shyoltozero, Rybreka, and Kvartsitny, as well as the city of Petrozavodsk itself.

Characteristics of Northern Veps are:

- Diphthongs are either preserved in their historical form (koume), or the first component is raised (jaug [jɑʊ̯g] > dʹoug).
- Combinations of vowel + l are usually preserved (talʹv [tɑlʲv], velg, sild, silʹm [silʲm], olda, sülʹg' [sylʲgʲ], pölvaz [ˡpølvaz]), rarely vocalized to diphthongs: al > au, el, il, ül [yl], öl [øl] > üu [yw] and ol > uu [uː].
- l, n, r are always palatalized before e in a non-initial syllable.
- Word-final consonants are not palatalized after i, in for example the past indicative, the conditional and some case forms.
- Long close vowels are retained, with *üü [yː] often diphthongized to üu (*püü > püu, contrast Southern and Central Veps pü).
- j is fortified to dʹ [dʲ] word-initially, and medially after consonants (jaug > dʹoug [dʲoʊ̯gː], jogi > dʹogi [dʲogi], järv > dʹärv [dʲærv], agj > agdʹ).
- The last consonant of the stem is lengthened in the third-person singular present indicative (küzub > küzzub, tapab > tappab), and stem-final e becomes o (lugeb > luggob).
- Only traces of vowel harmony are retained.

=== Central ===
Central Veps dialects are rather distinct from each other compared to Northern and Southern Veps, which are relatively homogeneous. They are spoken around a long line stretching from Tervenichi in the Lodeinopolsky District of Leningrad Oblast to near Lake Beloye. The largest locality speaking Central Veps dialects is Vinnitsy.

Characteristics of Central Veps are:

- Diphthongs are usually modified (sain > seinʹ, söi > süi).
- Combinations of vowel + l are vocalized to diphthongs in Kuya and Pondala (Belozersk), and usually preserved elsewhere (edel, silʹm, sülʹkta, völ).
- al and el are vocalized to ou or uu (el may also become üu) in the adessive and ablative case forms (talvel > touvuu/touvüu, mägelpäi > mäguupei).
- Word-final consonants are palatalized after i (mänid > mänidʹ, mänižin > mänižinʹ).
- In Kuya village, the vowel in the allative ending depends on the preceding stem vowel. After i the ending is -le (kanoile), after a it is -la (kalala) and after other vowels it is -lo (lebulo).
- j is preserved in most dialects, mostly in the west (jono, agj). j is fortified to dʹ in Kuya (dʹono, agdʹ). It is fortified to gʹ in Pondala, Voylahta, Nemzha, and Shimozero (gʹono, aggʹ).
- Final obstruent devoicing in Kuya Veps (sanub > sanup, vellesed > velleset).
- Unrounding of ü and ö in a few villages (pühä > pihä, pökoi > pekoi).
- ä > e in Shimozero (päiv > pei(v)).
- Vowel harmony is weakly preserved, most prominently in the eastern and south-western areas.

=== Southern ===
Southern Veps is spoken in the Boksitogorsky District of Leningrad Oblast, including the villages of Radogoshcha and Sidorovo.

Characteristics of Southern Veps are:

- Diphthongs are monophthongized to long vowels, especially in non-initial syllables (pertišpäi > pertišpää, heboine > heboone).
- Combinations of vowel + l are usually preserved.
- al and el are vocalized to aa and oo in the adessive and ablative case forms (talʹvel > talʹvoo, kezal > kezaa).
- l and n are palatalized before e in non-initial syllables when followed by a case ending or person-and-number ending. r is not palatalized.
- Word-final consonants are palatalized after i, in for example the past indicative, the conditional and some case forms.
- j is preserved (jogi, jüged).
- Unrounding of front rounded vowels, ü > i (pühä > pihä) and ö > e.
- The ending -i of the third-person singular past indicative is usually dropped, leaving palatalization of the preceding consonant (pästi > pästʹ, väti > vätʹ, kolkati > kolkatʹ).
- Vowel harmony is preserved well (höblötädä, pörüdä, södä).

== Phonology ==
=== Consonants ===
Consonant phonemes of Veps
| | | Labial | | Dental/ Alveolar | | Post- alveolar/ Palatal | Velar | | Glottal | |
| | | plain | palat. | plain | palat. | Post- alveolar/ Palatal | plain | palat. | plain | palat. |
|---|---|---|---|---|---|---|---|---|---|---|
| Nasal | | m | mʲ | n | nʲ | | | | | |
| Plosive | voiceless | p | pʲ | t | tʲ | | k | kʲ | | |
| Plosive | voiced | b | | d | dʲ | | ɡ | ɡʲ | | |
| Affricate | voiceless | | | ts | | tʃ | | | | |
| Affricate | voiced | | | | | dʒ | | | | |
| Fricative | voiceless | f | | s | sʲ | ʃ | | | | |
| Fricative | voiced | v | vʲ | z | zʲ | ʒ | | | h | hʲ |
| Approximant | | | | l | lʲ | j | | | | |
| Trill | | | | r | rʲ | | | | | |

==== Palatalization ====
In general, palatalizable consonants are palatalized allophonically before a front vowel. However, palatalized consonants also occur in other environments, especially in word-final position or in word-final clusters.

There are some cases where the front vowel /i/ is preceded by a non-palatalized consonant. In native Finnic vocabulary, this occurs where inflectional endings beginning with /i/ are attached to words with a stem ending in a non-palatalized consonant. The consonant is not palatalized by /i/ in this case, but remains non-palatalized by analogy with the other inflected forms. The vowel /i/ is backed to [ɨ] in this case, as in Russian, making it unclear whether the palatalization is a consequence of the front vowel, or the backing is the result of the lack of palatalization. Either analysis is possible.

Compare:

- norʹ /norʲ/ ("young"), genitive singular noren /norʲen/, partitive plural norid /norʲid/
- nor /nor/ ("rope"), genitive singular noran /norɑn/, partitive plural norid /norid/ (or /norɨd/)

Russian loanwords have also introduced instances of non-palatalized consonants followed by /i/, which are much more frequent in that language.

The phoneme /e/ can also in some cases be preceded by non-palatalized consonants, for example in the allative ending -le.

=== Vowels ===
Vowel phonemes of Veps
| | Front | | Central | Back |
| | Unr. | Rnd. | Central | Back |
|---|---|---|---|---|
| Close | i | y | (ɨ) | u |
| Mid | e | ø | | o |
| Open | æ | | | ɑ |

The status of /ɨ/ is marginal; it occurs as an allophone of /i/ after a non-palatalized consonant. See above under "Palatalization" for more information. It does not occur in the first syllable of a word.

==== Vowel harmony ====
Like many other Finnic languages, Veps has vowel harmony but in a much more limited form. Words are split into back-vowel and front-vowel words based on which vowels they contain:

- Back vowels: /ɑ/, /o/ and /u/
- Front vowels: /æ/, /ø/ and /y/

However, the front vowels can only occur in the first two syllables of a word. In a third or later syllable, and also sometimes in the second syllable, they are converted to the corresponding back vowel. Thus, vowel harmony only applies (inconsistently) in the second syllable, and has been lost elsewhere. It is not applied for inflectional endings except in a few exceptional cases, but is retained more frequently in derivational endings.

For example:

- korged ("high", back-vowel harmony), genitive singular korktan, derived noun korktuz' ("height"); compare Finnish korkean, korkeus.
- pimed ("dark", back-vowel harmony), genitive singular pimedan, derived noun pimeduz' ("darkness"); compare Finnish pimeän, pimeys.
- hüvä ("good", front-vowel harmony), illative singular hüväha, derived noun hüvüz' ("goodness"); compare Finnish hyvään, hyvyys.
- päiv ("day", front-vowel harmony), genitive singular päivän, illative singular päivhan; compare Finnish päivän, päivään.
- pä ("head", back-vowel harmony), illative singular päha; compare Finnish päähän.
- keza ("summer", back-vowel harmony); compare Finnish kesä.
- vävu ("son-in-law", back-vowel harmony); compare Finnish vävy.
- üldüda ("to rise", front-vowel harmony in second syllable, back-vowel in third); compare Finnish yltyä.
- küzuda ("to ask", back-vowel harmony); compare Finnish kysyä.

== Orthography ==
The modern Vepsian alphabet is a Latin alphabet. It consists of a total of twenty-nine characters: twenty-two are from the basic modern Latin alphabet, six are derived from basic Latin letters by the addition of diacritical marks, and the final character is the prime symbol, which signifies palatalization of the preceding sound.

Majuscule Forms (also called uppercase or capital letters)
| A | B | C | Č | D | E | F | G | H | I | J | K | L | M | N | O | P | R | S | Š | Z | Ž | T | U | V | Ü | Ä | Ö | ʹ |
Minuscule Forms (also called lowercase or small letters)
| a | b | c | č | d | e | f | g | h | i | j | k | l | m | n | o | p | r | s | š | z | ž | t | u | v | ü | ä | ö | ʹ |

Veps orthography is largely phonemic, and represents each phoneme with one letter. Palatalized consonants are single phonemes, and thus the combination of a letter and a following prime symbol is a single combined letter for this purpose. The following table shows the correspondences between letters and phonemes:

| Letter | Phoneme |
|---|---|
| a | /ɑ/ |
| b | /b/ |
| c | /t͡s/, /t͡sʲ/ |
| cʹ | /t͡sʲ/ |
| č | /t͡ʃ/ |
| d | /d/, /dʲ/ |
| dʹ | /dʲ/ |
| e | /e/ |
| f | /f/ |
| g | /ɡ/, /ɡʲ/ |
| gʹ | /ɡʲ/ |
| h | /h/, /hʲ/ |
| hʹ | /hʲ/ |
| i | /i/ (sometimes [ɨ]) |

| Letter | Phoneme |
|---|---|
| j | /j/ |
| k | /k/, /kʲ/ |
| kʹ | /kʲ/ |
| l | /l/, /lʲ/ |
| lʹ | /lʲ/ |
| m | /m/, /mʲ/ |
| mʹ | /mʲ/ |
| n | /n/, /nʲ/ |
| nʹ | /nʲ/ |
| o | /o/ |
| p | /p/, /pʲ/ |
| pʹ | /pʲ/ |
| r | /r/, /rʲ/ |
| rʹ | /rʲ/ |

| Letter | Phoneme |
|---|---|
| s | /s/, /sʲ/ |
| sʹ | /sʲ/ |
| š | /ʃ/ |
| z | /z/, /zʲ/ |
| zʹ | /zʲ/ |
| ž | /ʒ/ |
| t | /t/, /tʲ/ |
| tʹ | /tʲ/ |
| u | /u/ |
| v | /v/, /vʲ/ |
| vʹ | /vʲ/ |
| ü | /y/ |
| ä | /æ/ |
| ö | /ø/ |

Palatalization of consonants before front vowels is not indicated in the orthography, so plain consonant letters can represent both types of consonant depending on what vowel follows. For the following letters ⟨i⟩ and ⟨e⟩, this is ambiguous, however: they can be preceded by both types of consonants, as noted above in the phonology section. Whether a consonant before the letter ⟨i⟩ or ⟨e⟩ is palatalized or not cannot be determined from the orthography and must be learned for each word.

== Grammar ==
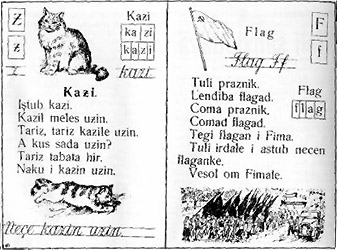
A Soviet textbook for native speakers of Veps printed in the 1930s

Like other Finnic languages, Veps is an agglutinating language. The preservation of the Proto-Finnic weak-grade consonants *d and *g in all positions, along with the loss of consonant gradation, has made Veps morphology relatively simple compared to the other Finnic languages. There are fewer inflectional classes, and inflections of nominals and verbs alike can be predicted from only a few basic principal parts.

=== Nouns ===
Veps has twenty-three grammatical cases, more than any other Finnic language. It preserves the basic set of Finnic cases shared by most Finnic languages, including the six locative cases, but several more cases have been added that generally have no counterpart in the others.

| Case | Singular ending | Plural ending | Meaning/use |
Basic/grammatical cases
| Nominative | ∅ | -d | Subject, object of imperative |
| Accusative | -n | -d | Complete (telic) object |
| Genitive | -n | -iden | Possession, relation |
| Partitive | -d, -t (-da) | -id | Partial object, indefinite amount |
Interior ("in") locative cases
| Inessive | -s (-š) | -iš | In, inside |
| Illative | -hV, -ze (-že) | -ihe, -iže | In, into |
| Elative | -späi (-špäi) | -išpäi | Out of |
Exterior ("on") locative cases
| Adessive | -l | -il | On, upon, on top of |
| Allative | -le (-lle) | -ile | Onto |
| Ablative | -lpäi | -ilpäi | Off, from (top, surface) |
Approximate ("at, near") locative cases
| Approximative I | -nno | -idenno | At, by, near |
| Approximative II | -nnoks | -idennoks | To, towards |
| Egressive | -nnopäi | -idennopäi | From |
Terminative (?) locative cases
| Terminative I-II | -hVsai, -zesai (-žesai)/-lesai (-llesai) | -ihesai, -ižesai/-ilesai | Till, until, up to; II used instead of I if the word often uses allative instead of illative |
| Terminative III | -ssai (-ššai?) | — | (Starting) From (such as noressai (from one's youth)) |
Additive (?) locative cases
| Additive I-II | -hVpäi, -zepäi (-žepäi)/-lepäi (-llepäi) | -ihepäi, -ižepai/-ilepäi | In the direction of, towards; II used instead of I if the word often uses allative instead of illative |
Other cases
| Essive-instructive | -n | -in | Being, acting as, with, by means of |
| Translative | -ks (-kš) | -ikš | Becoming, turning into |
| Abessive | -ta | -ita | Without, lacking |
| Comitative | -nke | -idenke | With, in company of, in combination with |
| Prolative | -dme, -tme (-dame) | -idme | Along |

Notes:

1. "V" indicates a copy of whatever vowel the genitive singular stem ends with, replacing a i, ä, ö, ü with e, a, o, u. For example, for the illative singular: mecan > mecha, noren > norehe, pöudon > pöudho, pän > päha. Note that the stem-final vowel itself can disappear in these forms, but the rule applies the same.
2. In endings beginning with s or z or a group of consonants containing s or z, this changes to š/ž if the last preceding vowel is i. This always occurs in the plural forms.
3. The partitive, allative, terminative II, additive II and prolative singular cases have longer endings that are used with a few frequently-used pronouns, ken "who" and mi "what".

==== Principal parts ====
Nouns have four principal parts, from which all other noun forms can be derived by replacing the endings:

- Nominative singular: Forms no other forms.
- Partitive singular: Forms the prolative singular. Can usually be formed from the genitive singular by replacing -n with -d, but some words have an unpredictable form with -t and a different stem.
- Genitive singular: When -n is removed, forms all remaining singular forms, and the nominative and accusative plural. It is often unpredictable due to historical apocope.
- Illative singular: Forms the illative, terminative I and additive I singular. The illative singular is predictably formed from the genitive singular stem, so it's not a principal part as such.
- Partitive plural: When -d is removed, forms all remaining plural forms.

The illative singular stem is the same as the genitive singular stem, except that the final vowel is dropped in some cases. The vowel is retained if at least one of these is the case, and dropped otherwise:

1. The final vowel is a diphthong.
2. The nominative singular is of the form "consonant-vowel-consonant-vowel".
3. The genitive singular has 1 or 3 syllables.
4. There is contraction of a syllable in the genitive singular stem (compared to the nominative stem), e.g. nom sg vauged > gen sg vauktan (contraction -ged > -kt-), nom sg lambaz > gen sg lambhan (contraction -az > -h-).
5. The final consonants of genitive singular stem are ll or lʹlʹ.

Thus:

| Nom sg | Gen sg | Ill sg | Rules |
|---|---|---|---|
| voi | voin | voihe | 1, 3 |
| kukoi | kukoin | kukoihe | 1 |
| tullei | tullein | tulleihe | 1, 5 |
| pä | pän | päha | 3 |
| vezi | veden | vedehe | 2 |
| labid | labidon | labidoho | 3 |
| piring | piringon | piringoho | 3 |
| tervhuzʹ | tervhuden | tervhudehe | 3 |
| vauged | vauktan | vauktaha | 4 |
| kaste | kastken | kastkehe | 4 |
| kondi | kondjan | kondjaha | 4 |
| velʹlʹ | vellen | vellehe | 5 |
| malʹlʹ | malʹlʹan | malʹlʹaha | 5 |
| norʹ | noren | norhe | None |
| kädetoi | kädetoman | kädetomha | None |

If the genitive singular stem has h before the final vowel, then the ending -ze (-že after i) is used, and the vowel is never dropped:

| Nom sg | Gen sg | Ill sg | Rules |
|---|---|---|---|
| tuha | tuhan | tuhaze | 2 |
| veneh | venehen | veneheze | 3 |
| laineh | lainhen | lainheze | 4 |
| lomineh | lominehen | lomineheze | None |
| lambaz | lambhan | lambhaze | 4 |
| madokaz | madokhan | madokhaze | 3, 4 |

=== Verbs ===
==== Endings ====
| | | Indicative | | Imperative | Conditional | | Potential |
| | | present | past | Imperative | present | past | Potential |
|---|---|---|---|---|---|---|---|
| 1st person | singular | -n | -in | | -ižin | -nuižin | -nen |
| 1st person | plural | -m | -im | -gam, -kam | -ižim | -nuižim | -nem |
| 2nd person | singular | -d | -id | – | -ižid | -nuižid | -ned |
| 2nd person | plural | -t | -it | -gat, -kat | -ižit | -nuižit | -net |
| 3rd person | singular | -b | -i | -g(a)ha, -k(a)ha | -iži | -nuiži | -neb |
| 3rd person | plural | -das, -tas (-ba) | -iba | -g(a)ha, -k(a)ha | -ižiba | -nuižiba | -neba |
| connegative | singular | – | -nd | – | -iži | -nuiži | -ne |
| connegative | plural | -goi, -koi | -nugoi | -goi, -koi | -iži | -nuiži | -ne |

Veps has innovated a special reflexive conjugation, which may have middle voice or passive voice semantics. The endings are as follows:

| | | Indicative | | Imperative | Conditional | | Potential |
| | | present | past | Imperative | present | past | Potential |
|---|---|---|---|---|---|---|---|
| 1st person | singular | -moi | -imoi | | -ižimoi | -nuižimoi | N/A |
| 1st person | plural | -moiš | -imoiš | -gamoiš, -kamoiš | -ižimoiš | -nuižimoiš | N/A |
| 2nd person | singular | -toi | -itoi | -de, -te | -ižitoi | -nuižitoi | N/A |
| 2nd person | plural | -toiš | -itoiš | -gatoiš, -katoiš | -ižitoiš | -nuižitoiš | N/A |
| 3rd person | singular | -se (-še) | -ihe | -g(a)has, -k(a)has | -ižihe | -nuižihe | N/A |
| 3rd person | plural | -se (-še) | -ihe | -g(a)has, -k(a)has | -ižihe | -nuižihe | N/A |
| connegative | singular | -de, -te | -nus | -de, -te | -ižihe | -nuiži | N/A |
| connegative | plural | -goiš, -koiš | -nus | -goiš, -koiš | -ižihe | -nuižihe | N/A |

Infinitives:

- First infinitive in -da or -ta (reflexive: add -s).
- Second infinitive in -de- or -te- with inessive or instructive case endings.
- Third infinitive in -ma- with inessive, illative, elative, adessive or abessive case endings.

Participles:

- Present active participle in -i (stem -ja-). This is the same suffix as is used for agent nouns.
- Past active participle in -nu (stem -nude-).
- Past passive participle in -dud or -tud.

The original Finnic present active participle is falling out of use, and is preserved only for a few verbs, as -b (stem -ba-).

==== Negative verb ====
| | | Present | Imperative |
|---|---|---|---|
| 1st person | singular | en | |
| 1st person | plural | em | algam |
| 2nd person | singular | ed | ala |
| 2nd person | plural | et | algat |
| 3rd person | | ei | algha |

=== Pronouns ===
The personal pronouns are of Finno-Ugric origin:

| Veps | English |
|---|---|
| minä | I |
| sinä | you |
| hän | he/she/it |
| mö | we |
| tö | you (plural) |
| hö | they |

== Vocabulary ==
=== Numbers ===
| Number | Veps |
|---|---|
| 1 | üksʹ |
| 2 | kaksʹ |
| 3 | koume |
| 4 | nelʹlʹ |
| 5 | viž |
| 6 | kuzʹ |
| 7 | seičeme |
| 8 | kahesa |
| 9 | ühesa |
| 10 | kümne |
| 11 | üksʹtoštkümne |
| 12 | kaksʹtoštkümne |
| 20 | kaksʹkümne |
| 34 | koumekümne nelʹlʹ |
| 100 | sada |
| 1000 | tuha |

== Sample text ==
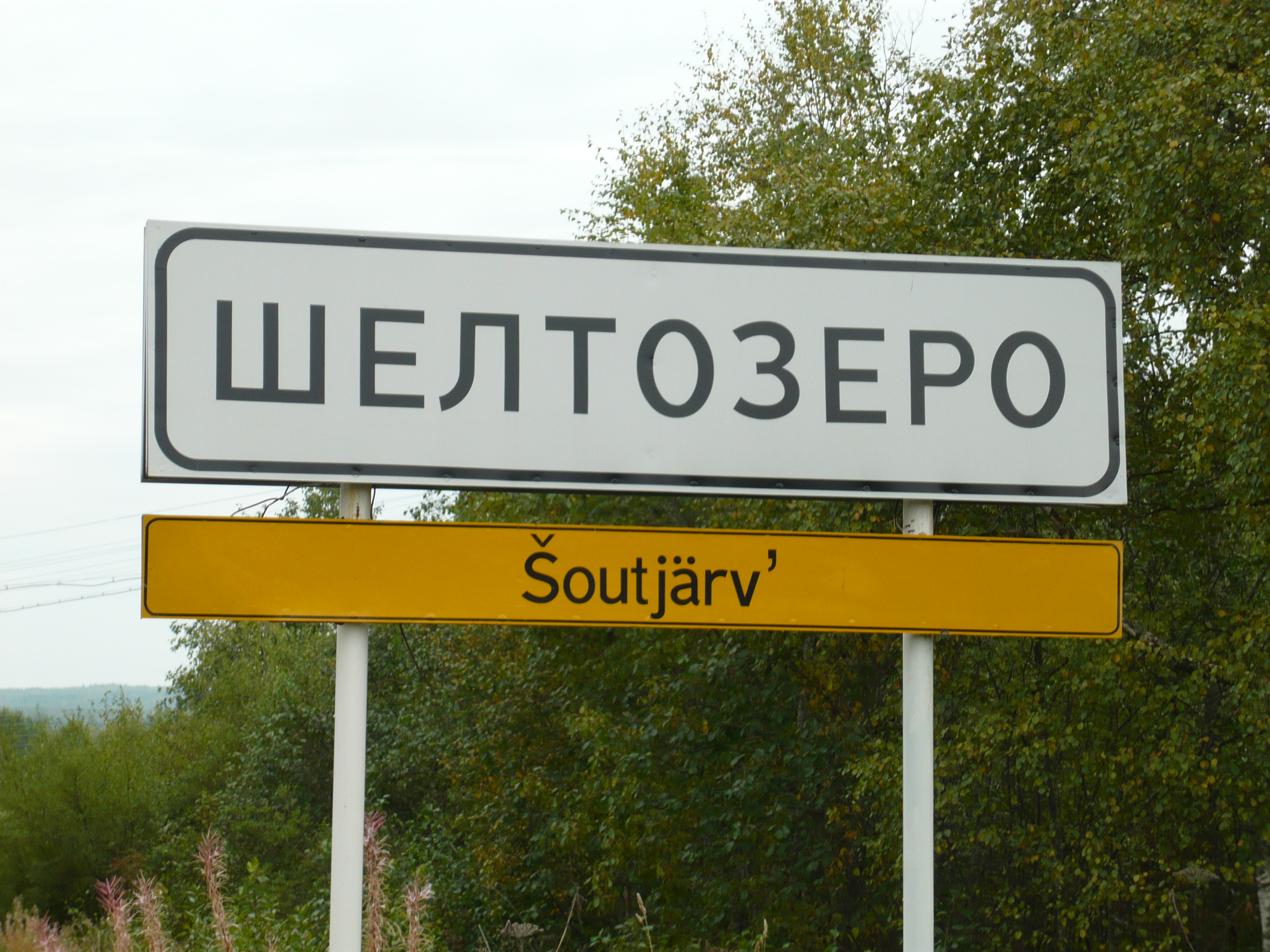
Road sign in Shyoltozero in Russian and Veps

Article 1 of the Universal Declaration of Human Rights:

Kaik mehed sünduba joudajin i kohtaižin, ühtejiččin ičeze arvokahudes i oiktusiš. Heile om anttud melʹ i huiktusentund i heile tariž kožuda toine toiženke kut velʹlʹkundad.

(English version: All human beings are born free and equal in dignity and rights. They are endowed with reason and conscience and should act towards one another in a spirit of brotherhood).

== See also ==
- Lonin Museum of Veps Ethnography

== Sources ==
- Grünthal, Riho (2022). "Veps". In Bakró-Nagy, Marianne; Laakso, Johanna; Skribnik, Elena (eds.). The Oxford Guide to the Uralic Languages. Oxford University Press. ISBN 978-0-19-876766-4.
- Zaitseva, M. I. (М. И. Зайцева) (1981). Grammatika vepsskogo yazyka Грамматика вепсского языка [A grammar of Veps] (in Russian). Leningrad: Nauka.
