= Flag of the Republic of Karelia =

Republic of Karelia
- Proportion: 2:3
- Adopted: 16 February 1993
- Design: A horizontal tricolour of red, sky blue and green
- Designed by: Alexander Ivanovich Kinnear

The flag of the Republic of Karelia (Russian: Флаг Республики Карелия, romanized: Flag Respubliki Kareliya, Karelian: Karjalan tazavallan valdivolline flagu, Veps: Karjalan Tazovaldkundan flag, Finnish: Karjalan tasavallan lippu) is the official state symbol of the Republic of Karelia. Adopted by the Supreme Council of the Republic of Karelia on February 16, 1993. The flag was designed by Alexander Ivanovich Kinnear.

The state flag of the Republic of Karelia is a rectangular panel with equal horizontal stripes: the upper stripe is red, the middle one is blue and the bottom green. The ratio of the width of the flag to its length is 2:3.

== Pre-Soviet history ==
The first known official Karelian flag was created by Jonas Heiska in 1918 and was first used on 21 June 1918 during Saint Peter's Day celebrations in the Uhtua Republic. The flag had a blue background with 7 silver stars, representing the Ursa Major constellation (Otava) on the upper left corner.

It was used for a very short time before it was replaced with a flag created by Akseli Gallen-Kallela on 25 May 1920. Instead of a constellation, Kallela used a silver rainbow with 53 columns (1 for each of the Karelian communities of the Republic) to represent the Aurora Borealis. The flag used black, red and green colors. The green color on the flag symbolized the forests and nature of Karelia, black – the native land and sorrow, red – the blood of patriots, joy and fire. The flag also used the Nordic cross, to represent that the Karelians are related to Finns.

After the Uhtua Republic was crushed, its flag was used during the East Karelian Uprising, the Finnish occupation of Soviet Karelia and was used by the United Government of Karelia.

In the 1930s, Karelian refugees in Finland tried to create a new flag for the Karelian people, the flag had a white background, with a blue and yellow Nordic cross on it. But the flag was not as widely used as the Karelian flag.

Jonas Heiska Otava flag

Akseli Gallen-Kallela state flag

Version of the Akseli Gallen-Kallela flag without the Aurora Borealis

War flag of the Uhtua Republic and the East Karelian Uprising

Karelian Group "Nord" in Ukraine

== Soviet Karelia ==
Until 16 June 1937, the Karelian ASSR did not have its own flag and used the flag of the Russian SFSR. The flag had a red background and a text saying "RSFSR, Karelian ASSR" in Russian and Karelian and Finnish in the top left corner. The Finnish text was removed on 29 December 1937 due to the purge of red Finnish politicians in Karelia. The text on the flag was in Latin until the Cyrillization of Karelian in the late 30s.

In 1940, the Karelo-Finnish SSR was created after the Winter War. This made Finnish the second official language of Karelia, while Karelian lost its official status. In April 1940, the flag was created, which was a red background with the words "Karelo-Finnish SSR" in the top left corner, along with a golden hammer and sickle.

In the 1940s, there were attempts to change the flag of the Republic, but all of them were unsuccessful.

On 13 March 1953, a new flag was adopted, it was a tricolour with a red stripe, a blue stripe, which made up 1:6 on the flag's height, and a green stripe, which made up 1:5 of the flag's height. On the red stripe, top left in the corner near the shaft there is a golden hammer and sickle and under them a red five-pointed star, framed by a golden border.

In 1956, Karelia became an autonomous republic of the RSFSR again and had to change its flag, which was adopted on 10 October 1956. The flag had a red background with a blue stripe 1:8 of the flag's length on the left, in the upper left corner of the red background a golden sickle and a hammer and above them a red five-pointed a star framed by a golden border was depicted. Under them the words Karelian ASSR were written in Russian and Finnish.

The text on the flag was slightly changed in 1978 and this version was used until 1993.

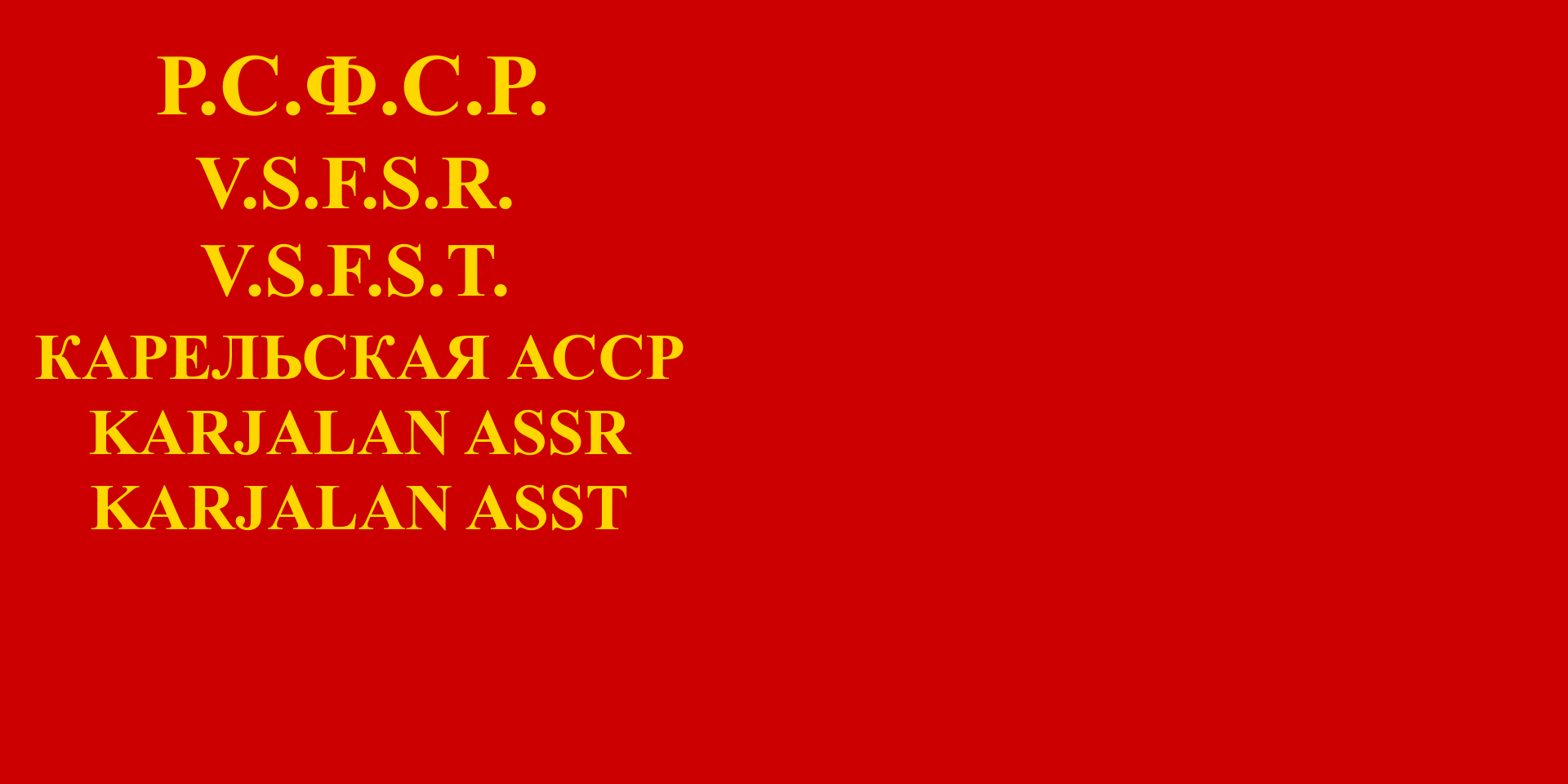
Early 1937 flag

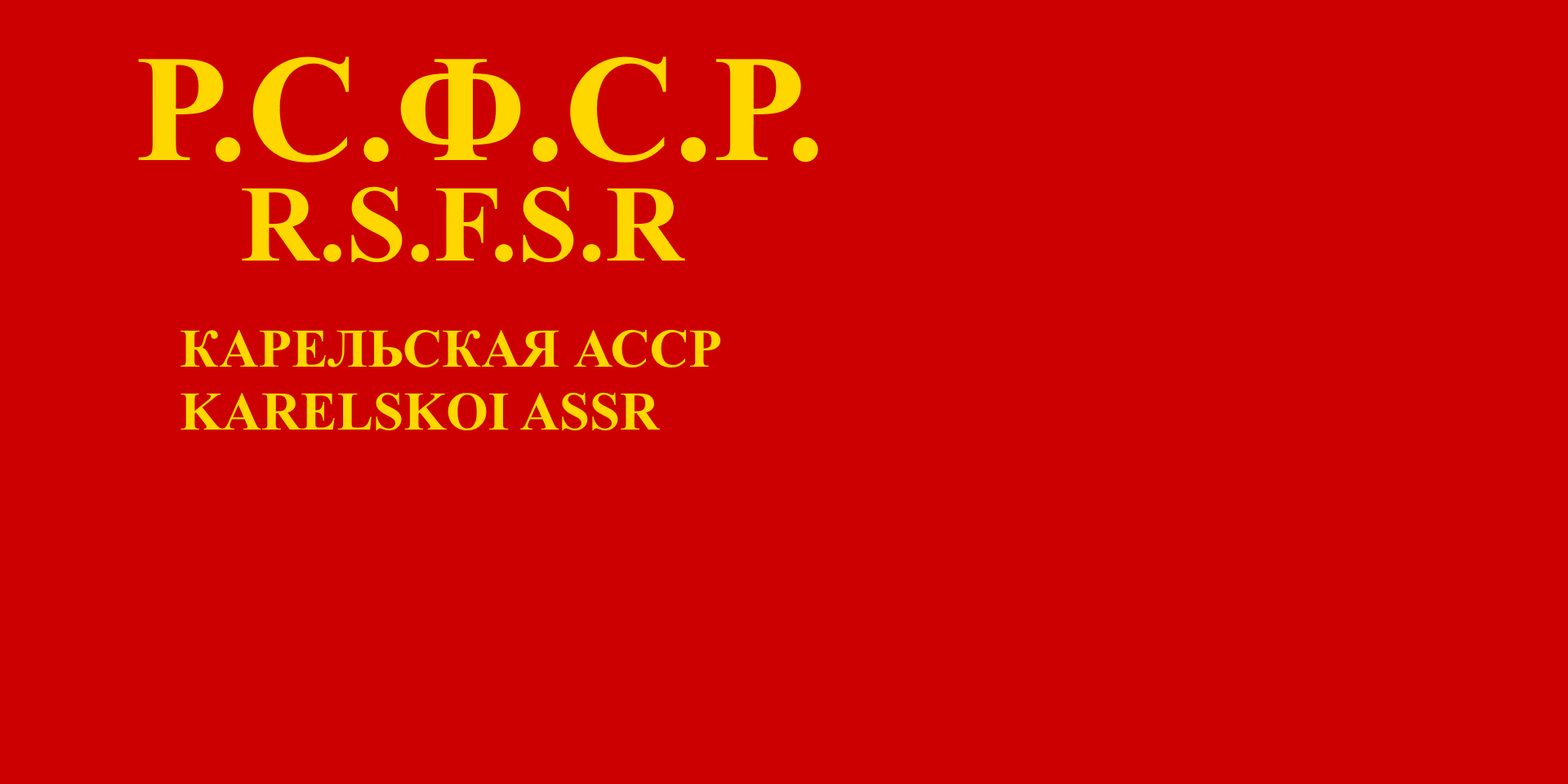
Flag using Karelian Latin script

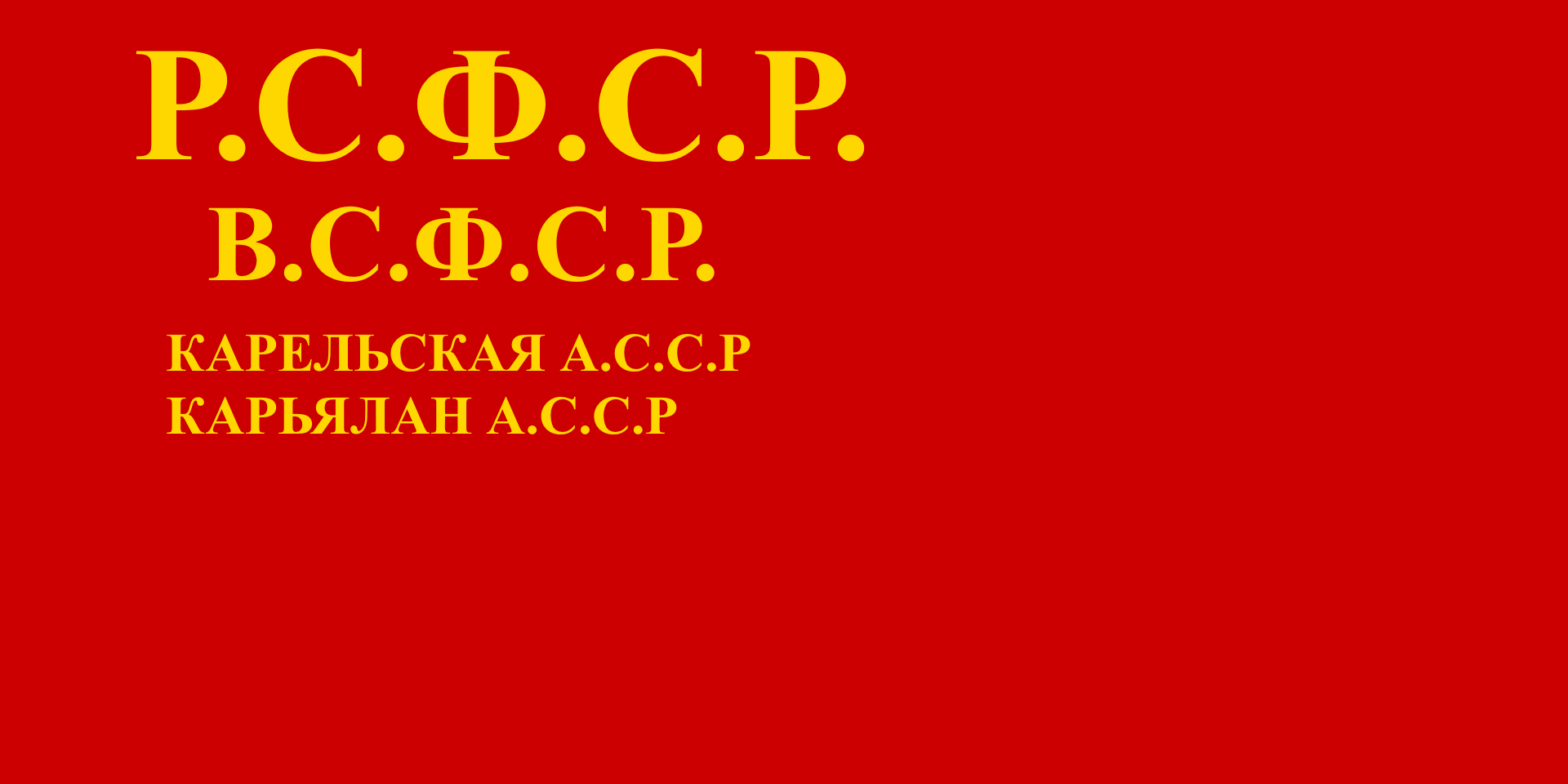
Flag using Karelian Cyrillic script

Flag of the Karelo-Finnish SSR (1940–1953)

Flag of the Karelo-Finnish SSR (1953–1956)

Flag of the Karelian ASSR (1956–1978)

Flag of the Karelian ASSR (1978–1991)

Flag of the Karelian SSR (24 May–13 November 1991) and the Republic of Karelia (13 November 1991 – 16 February 1993)

== Modern Karelia ==
In 1992, over 50 flag suggestions were discussed by the flag committee, but only 5 passed, including the state flag of Akseli Gallen-Kallela. But the flag designed by Alexander Ivanovich Kinnear, which is based on the flag of the Karelo-Finnish SSR, gained the support of 75 out of 113 deputies and became the official flag of the Republic in April 1993.

Flag of the Republic of Karelia

The state flag of the Republic of Karelia is a rectangular panel with equal horizontal stripes: the upper stripe is red, the middle one is blue and the bottom green. The ratio of the width of the flag to its length is 2:3.

Flag of the Republic of Karelia with K-FSSR colors

Incorrect flag of the Republic of Karelia with a dark blue stripe, used by some of the ministries

== Legacy of the old flags ==
Flag designs of Jonas Heiska and Akseli Gallen-Kallela are still used by various ethnic and political organizations of Karelia to this day. The version of the Akseli Gallen-Kallela flag without the Aurora Borealis became the ethnic flag of Karelian people. It also influenced the designs of the Luudi and Veps ethnic flags. The flag of the village of Kalevala (former Uhtua) uses elements of the 1920 design.

The Otava flag was used by the Karelian Republican Movement in early 2010s.

Ethnic flag of Karelians

Ethnic flag of the Veps people

Alternative Veps flag showcased in the Lonin Museum of Veps Ethnography

Ethnic flag of the Ludian people

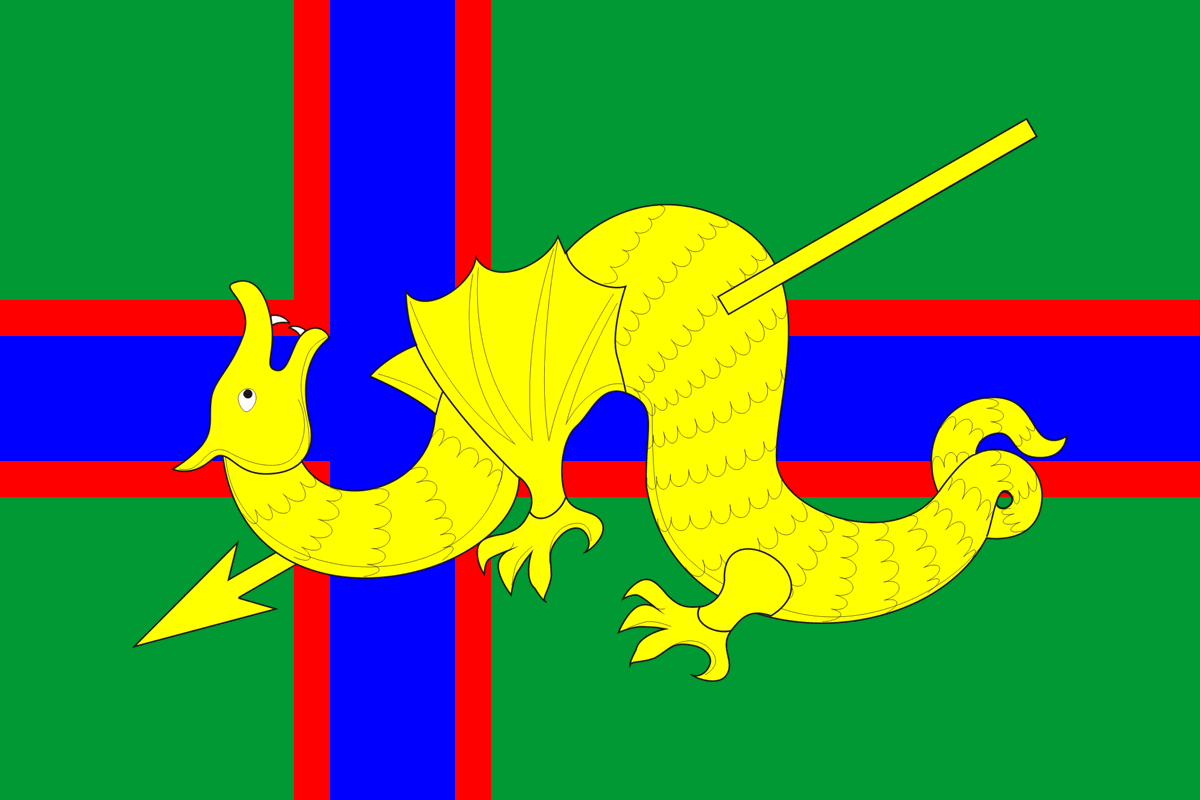
Flag of Mikhaylovskoye

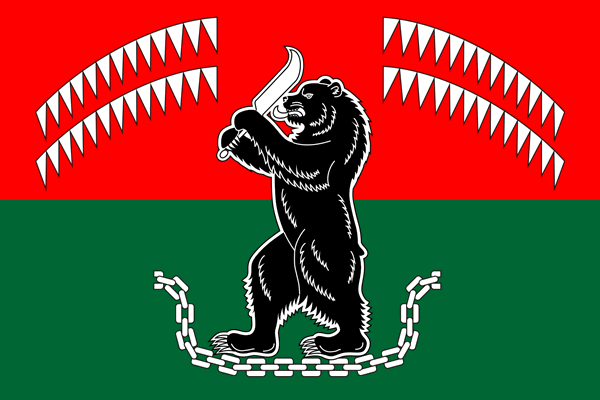
Flag of Kalevala

Darker version of the Otava flag used by the RMK

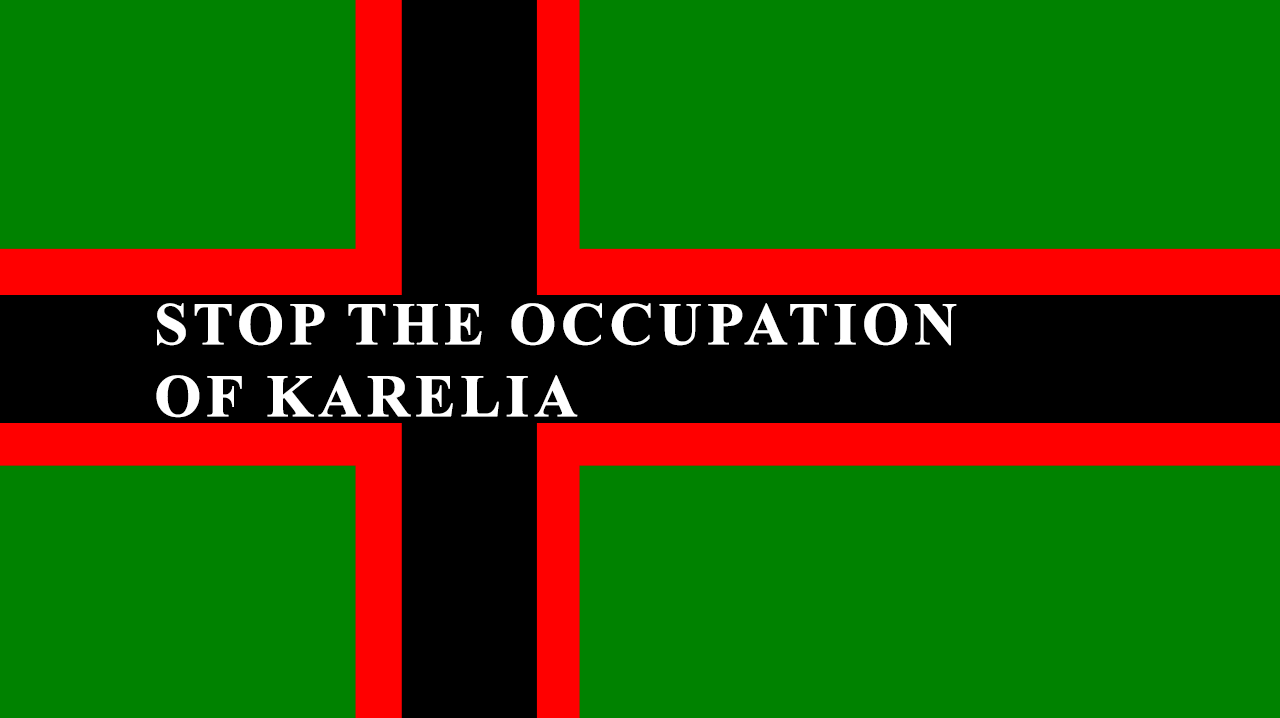
Flag of the separatist Karelian National Movement

Flag of the Karelian Group

Variant flag of the Karelian Group

== Proposed flags ==
1920 proposal

1920 proposal

1947 proposal

1976 proposal

1992 proposal

1992 proposal

1992 proposal

1992 proposal

== See also ==
- Flag of the Karelo-Finnish SSR
- Flag of Dagestan

== Sources ==
- Paškov, Aleksandr Mihailovitš (1994). Karjalan vaakunat ja liput. Petrozavodsk: KAREKO. ISBN 5-88129-010-0.
- The Constitution of the Republic of Karelia, paragraph 12.
- The official site of the Republic
