= Suur-Suomen Sotilaat =

- Soldiers of Greater Finland
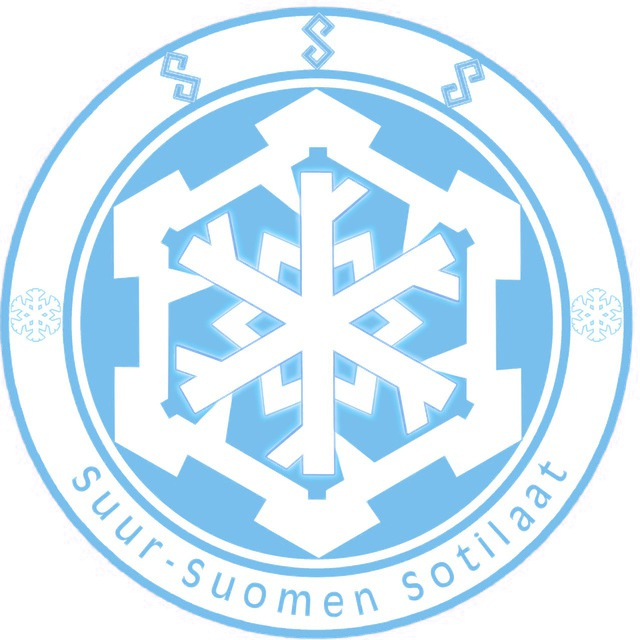
- Roundel logo of SSS
- Spokesperson: Artur Ankkalainen
- Founded: 2022; 4 years ago (As Suur-Suomen Sotilaat); 2015; 11 years ago (Original organization)
- Active regions: Russia; Finland; Ukraine
- Ideology: Pan-Finnicism; Separatism
- Size: 20 member organizations 100+ individual members
- Website: Official website

Suur-Suomen Sotilaat (Russian: Солдаты Великой Финляндии, romanized: Soldaty Velikoy Finlyandii; English: Soldiers of Greater Finland) is a Pan-Finno-Ugric nationalist organization, “project” and coalition of Finno-Ugric separatist organizations and “projects”. The organization includes multiple partners and members along with the “Council of Equals (Council of the New World)”, one of which being the Karelian National Movement. The organization, along with all its members are considered as terrorists in the Russian Federation. Suur-Suomen Sotilaat and its members mainly operate in regions in the Russian Federation, especially the Republic of Karelia, with Finno-Ugric minorities, but one partner, Uusi Vihan Veljet (New Brothers of Hate), operates in Finland.

== History ==
=== Establishment ===
The organization was originally founded in 2015 as "Vapaa Kotimaa/Free Finno-Ugria" (English: Free Homeland/Free Finno-Ugria), but later changed its name to Suur-Suomen Sotilaat by 2022 and first came to international attention at the third forum of the Free Nations of Post-Russia Forum at Gdańsk in 2022. Some have criticized the organization for being far-right and possibly leading supporters or members towards extremism.

=== Activities ===
Suur-Suomen Sotilaat has been a part of, or participated in, multiple events organized by groups such as the Anti-Imperial Block of Nations, Right Sector, Free Nations of Post-Russia Forum and various Finnish far-right groups. Suur-Suomen Sotilaat along with its members and other groups affiliated with the Free Nations of Post-Russia Forum were declared as undesirable, terrorist and extremist by Russia on December 28, 2024.

Suur-Suomen Sotilaat claims to represent various Finno-Ugric indigenous peoples in the Russian Federation and elsewhere: Finns, Karelians, Veps, Ingrians, Izhorians, Estonians, Komi, Moksha, Mari, Chuvash, Meryans, Sámi, Votians, Shokshas, Setos, Muroms, Mescherans, Tornedalians, Hungarians/Magyars, Livonians, Erzyas and Udmurts.

== Members ==
Suur-Suomen Sotilaat has 18 member organizations under its coalition. The member organizations' sizes and activities vary from organization to organization. Some member organizations also engage in direct actions, paramilitary actions and engage in armed combat with Russian forces.

Representing	Flag used by SSS	Name of organization(s)
Chuvash		Chӑvash-Atӑlҫi Pӑlhar Elchisen Kanashӗ (Diplomatic Council of Chuvashia Volga Bulgaria), Ulӑp — Chӑvash kul'turi tata Vattisen jӑli
Erzyas		Ěrzäń Kepedevema
Finns		Uusi Vihan Veljet (New Brothers of Hate)
Ingrians		White Ingria, Kilpi (Shield), “Nevanmaa” Inkerinmaan Vapautusliike (“Nevanmaa” Ingrian Liberation Movement)
Karelians		Karelian National Movement, Karelian Group "NORD", Suuri Karjala (Great Karelia) Pohjoinen Veljeskunta (Northern Brotherhood)
Komi		Jugdandor (Dawn)
Mari		Kalikle Mari Ushem “Mari Kava”
Meryas		Tuiban Kerdo
Mokshas		Mokšen' Kalkon' Komitets' (Moksha National Committee)
Sámi		Leuku Ayeke-Tiermesa
Pomors		Free Pomoria
Udmurts		Söd Yus
Veps		Vepsän Liikumine “Jumou” (Veps Movement “Jumou”)
Finno-Ugrians		Finno-Ugric Human Rights Center "Ranta"

== Goals and position ==
=== The SSS Coalition ===
Suur-Suomen Sotilaat wishes to create several independent Finno-Ugric republics out of the Russian Federation and create a new Eastern Europe, which would be headed by a coalition of Finno-Ugric states. More specifically they wish to “create a distinct Finno-Ugric world, separate from Muscovy and other invaders, to build a shared civilization with fraternal peoples”. The organization accepts ethnic Russians and others as well into its ranks, as long as they wish to help in the creation of the “New World” or “reconnect with their historical roots”. Despite the name the organization does not believe in the direct annexation of Finno-Ugric lands into Finland, but the creation of a European Union -style confederation.

The organization rejects ideologies and ideals it sees as foreign and alien, such as imperialism and Stalinism (Marxism and Communism as a whole). The organization doesn't claim the need for “Finno-Ugric supremacy”, but states that it views the Finno-Ugric people as being equals to those of Germanic and Slavic origin. They also state that the Soviet Union and the concept itself of Russia are manmade imperialist projects.

=== The Council of Equals (Council of the New World) ===
Despite the name of the council, it holds no connection to the New World Order conspiracy theory. The council states that its intention is to turn the ancient Finno-Ugric peoples into modern European societies, while still maintaining their roots. The model proposed by the council is described by them as preventing “unprofessional governance”, vote rigging and the manipulation of “the less savvy segment of society”. Instead, wishing to replace decision making (on some level) with experts, who “can vote in minutes”.

The Council of Equals is structured into different blocs of peoples and their representatives. Each people's bloc is split into three inner blocs, each with their own representative:

- The Academic Bloc, which includes “accredited representatives with academic degrees and individuals with sufficient knowledge and authority among professionals whose work is related to science”.
- The Security Bloc, which includes “professionals from the security forces who are professionally involved in military affairs and actively participate in the development and support of security agencies”.
- The Cultural Bloc, which includes “representatives of activist movements, organizations, media, and creative arts who do not hold academic degrees and are not related to science, but who have made a significant contribution to the development of the people they represent”.

In the council, each people's blocs’ representative takes into account the votes of the inner blocs before voting in the council itself and representing the three different inner blocs. The council states that this model might change in the future to include new blocs.

== See also ==
- Karelian National Movement
- Academic Karelia Society
- Separatism in Russia
