= Vladimir Jao =

Russian businessman

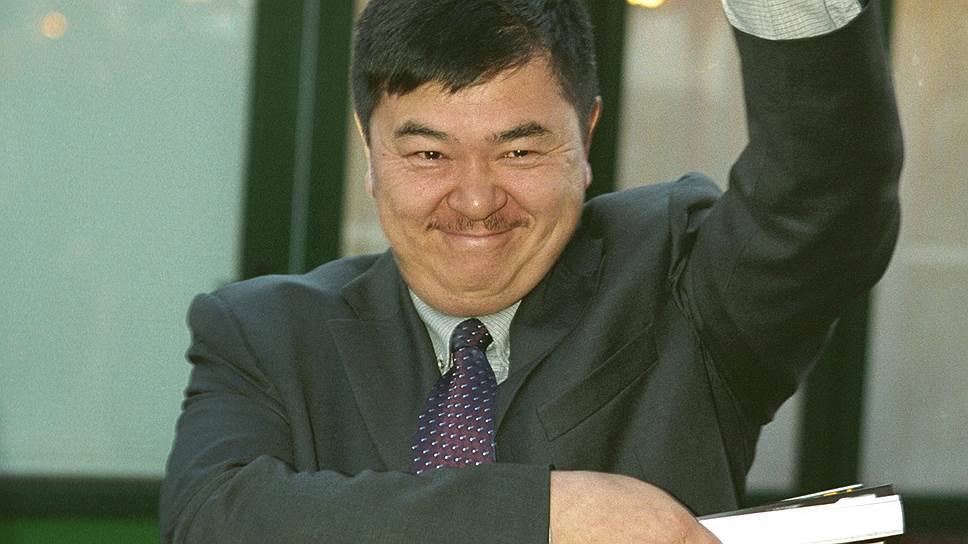
Vladimir Jao

Vladimir Jao (Russian: Владимир Джао, born 25 June 1960, Shanghai, China) is a Russian businessman and manager of Chinese origin.

Since February 25, 2005, he has been the General Director of the airline catering supplier Aeromar JSC, which is part of the Aeroflot Group. He is a co-owner of the newspaper The Moscow Times. Jao is the great-nephew of Chinese military figure Zhu De and the Chinese writer Zhao Shuli.

== Biography ==
Vladimir Jao was born on June 25, 1960, in Shanghai. In 1963, his family moved from China to the Soviet Union to the city of Bishkek in the Kirghiz SSR.

Jao's parents worked at the Tyazhelectromash plant. His father was a locksmith. In 1971, after Jao's father got a job with Soviet state radio and television, the Jao family moved to Moscow.

His father worked as an announcer of the Shanghai dialect, as well as a translator in the magazines Sovetsky Soyuz, Soviet Woman and The New Times, and his mother from 1971 to 1987 worked as a teacher of Chinese at a boarding school, and for more than 20 years she taught Chinese in courses under the Ministry of Foreign Trade of the USSR and the Ministry of Foreign Affairs of the USSR.

In 2003, Jao received a Ph.D. in economics. His dissertation was on the topic of business tourism development.

Since February 25, 2005, he has been the General Director of Aeromar JSC.

In 2017, he became the majority owner of the independent Amsterdam-based English- and Russian-language online newspaper The Moscow Times. Jao owns 51%, the founder of the publication Derk Sauer 19%, his partner in media projects and the CEO of this company Svetlana Korshunova 30%.

Jao is one of the co-owners of the oldest Moscow club "Chinese Pilot Zhao Da" and the owner of the China Town restaurant in Moscow.
