= Frits Barend =

Dutch journalist and presenter

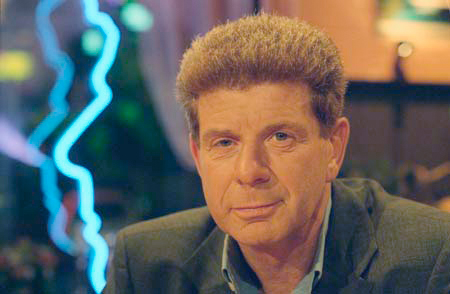
- Born: 17 February 1947 (age 79); Amsterdam, Netherlands
- Occupations: Journalist; Radio presenter; Television presenter
- Known for: Barend & Van Dorp

Frits Barend (born 17 February 1947) is a Dutch journalist, radio and television presenter. He is known for presenting the late night television talk show Barend & Van Dorp with Henk van Dorp.

== Career ==
In 1998, Barend and Henk van Dorp began presenting Villa BvD, a talk show held on multiple occasions when a large association football event was held (e.g., 1998 FIFA World Cup and UEFA Euro 2000). The show featured Jan Mulder as sidekick. Barend and Van Dorp won the Omroepman van het Jaar award in 2000. In 2009, he started together with his daughter Barbara Barend the sports magazine Helden.

In 2007, he was one of the co-founders of the television channel Het Gesprek, together with Ruud Hendriks and Derk Sauer. The channel exclusively broadcast interviews and debates. The channel stopped broadcasting in August 2010 due to financial problems.

In 2023, Barend received multiple awards for his contributions to human rights in Argentina. He received the award for his work as journalist during the 1978 FIFA World Cup held in Argentina. In the same year, he appeared in the third season of the television show Beter Laat dan Nooit in which Barend, Edwin Rutten, Ad Visser and Henny Huisman travel through Nepal, South Korea and Cambodia.

He was cast to play a resistance fighter in the war musical 40-45 but his acting skills did not prove to be good enough. A few months later, he got a small role as a pilot in the musical.

== Personal life ==
Barend was born in 1947 in a Jewish family. He attended the Vossius Gymnasium in Amsterdam and he studied political science at the University of Amsterdam. He did not complete his studies.

He is the father of two daughters: Kim Barend and journalist and television presenter Barbara Barend.
