= Karelian Group =

Karelian voluntary military unit

Karelian Group "Nord"
- Karjalan ryhmä "Nord" (Karelian)
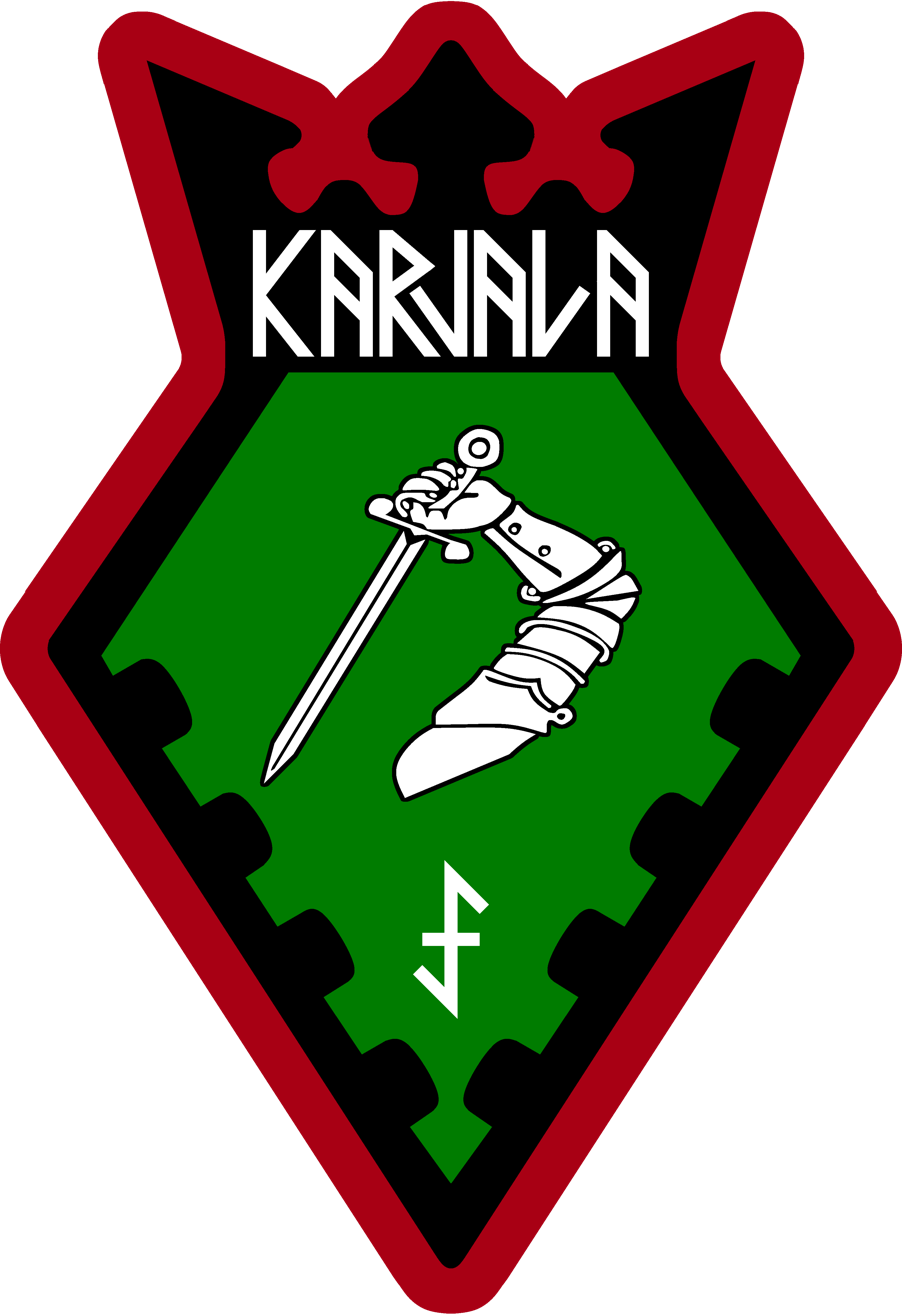
- Battalion insignia
- Active: 19 January 2023 – present
- Country: Ukraine
- Type: Foreign volunteer battalion
- Role: Light infantry Information warfare Activism
- Size: Unknown
- Part of: Russian Volunteer Corps until January 2026.
- Nickname: "Nord"
- Engagements: Russo-Ukrainian War; Russian invasion of Ukraine; Eastern Ukraine campaign; Battle of Avdiivka; 2023 Belgorod incursions; March 2024 Western Russia incursion; 2024 Kharkiv offensive
- Website: Official Telegram channel

Commanders
- Current commander: "Goth"

Insignia
- Flag

The Karelian Group "Nord" (Karelian: Karjalan ryhmä), formerly known as the Karelian National Battalion (Ukrainian: Карельський національний батальйон, romanized: Karelskyi natsionalnyi batalion; Karelian: Karjalan Kanšallini Pataljona) also known as Nord, is a formation of the Ukrainian Armed Forces, formerly functioning as a component of the Russian Volunteer Corps. The group is a voluntary military unit that consists mainly of ethnic Karelians and other Baltic-Finnic peoples. Its primary objective is to achieve the independence of the Republic of Karelia from Russia.

== History ==
=== Formation ===
On 27 February 2022, Ukrainian President Volodymyr Zelenskyy made an announcement declaring the establishment of an international fighting force to assist in defending the sovereignty and independence of Ukraine amidst the Russian invasion.

On 19 January 2023, most likely in reaction to the need for international volunteers, the Karelian Group was established by representatives associated with the Karelian National Movement—a nationalist movement advocating for Karelian independence since 2012, prior to the Revolution of Dignity, and Euromaidan. The announcement of the unit specified that it would be incorporated into the Ukrainian Armed Forces and operate within the framework of the International Legion. The stated purpose of the battalion, according to the several Karelian political activists involved in the establishment of the unit, was to engage in combat against the Russians in the Russian invasion of Ukraine. Additionally, they expressed the long-term goal of achieving the complete liberation and independence for the region of Karelia which they refer to as "occupied Karelia"—commonly known as the "Republic of Karelia". The Karelian Group also strives to promote the independence of other Finno-Ugric peoples from Russia.

=== Recruitment of volunteers ===
According to the Ukraina Moloda newspaper, the unit began recruiting in late January 2023. It was mentioned that there were several requirements for volunteers to join the unit, these consisted of good health, no problems with substances or alcohol, a devotion to traditional "Nordic values", and a desire to achieve Karelian independence from the Russian Federation, as well as a desire to contribute to the victory over the so-called "terrorist regime" of Russian President Vladimir Putin.

=== Insignia and Nickname ===
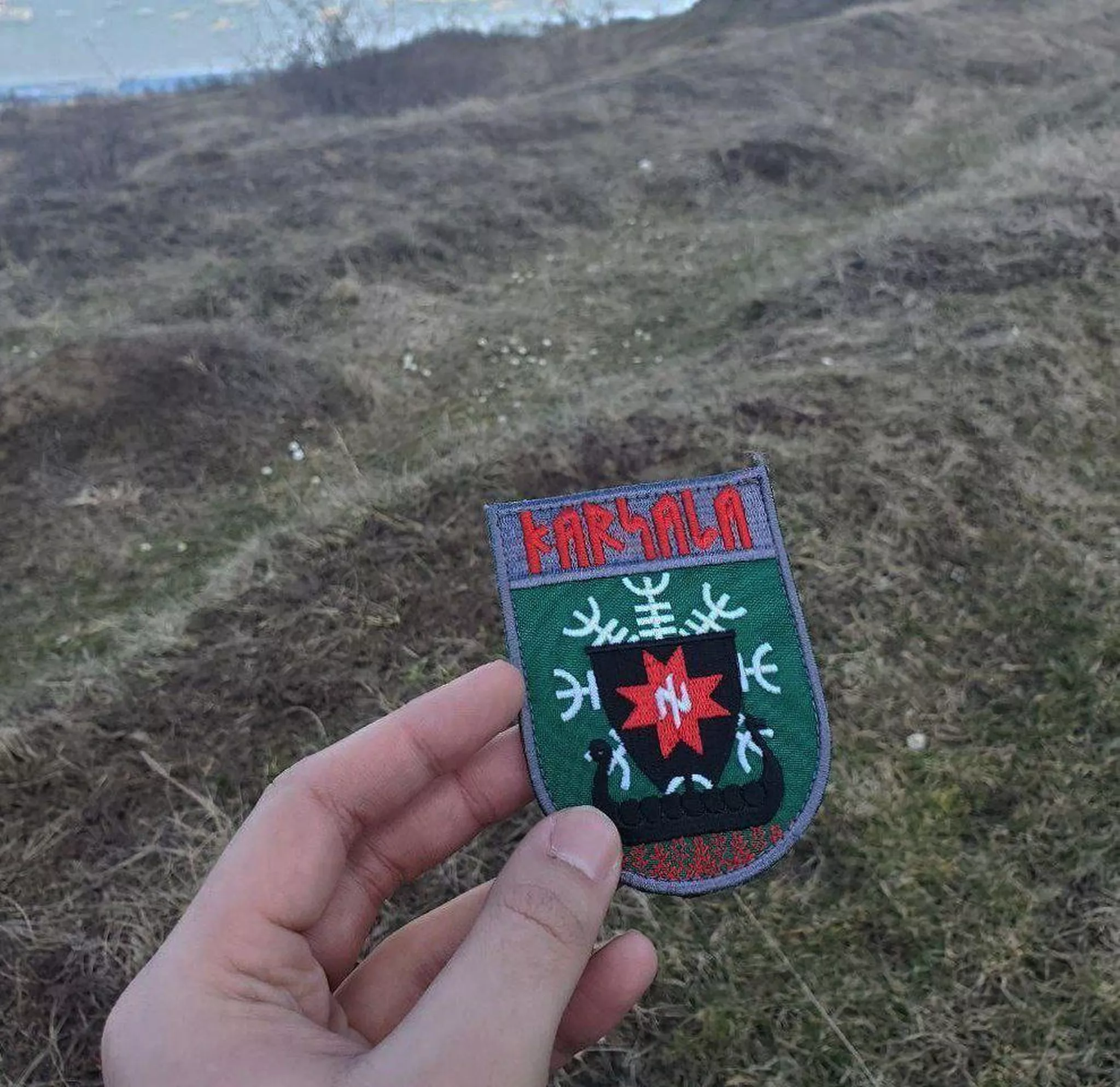
First variant of the battalion's insignia.

The battalion bore the name "Ukki Väinämöinen", also known as Vaseli Levonen, which is shown on one of the unofficial battalion's insignia. Ukki Väinämöinen was a Karelian ideological leader known for his role in the East Karelian uprising against Bolshevik Russia in the years 1921–1922. In October 2023, the battalion changed its nickname with its insignia to bear the nickname "Nord". In June 2024, according to publications, the unit changed its name to be Karelian Group "Nord", retaining its nickname.

==== Official insignia ====
The initial emblem adopted by the unit was on 19 January 2023, and was uploaded to their Telegram channel; it featured a circular chevron with a Viking ship in the middle. On the boat's banner was a wolfsangel that was very much similar in appearance to the wolfsangel utilised in the variation of the Azov Brigade's insignia, and the rest of the patch featured other Nordic patterns and insignias. This was accompanied by the inscription "Karjala," meaning Karelia, at the top of the patch.

In October 2023, as part of a rebranding effort, the unit changed its insignia again. The current insignia drew inspiration from the Academic Karelia Society, displaying an arm with armour plating and a shield. The insignia preserves the "Karjala" inscription, the Karelian color scheme, and the Wolfsangel.

==== Unofficial insignia ====
The emblem was displayed in the distinctive colors of Karelia. Following the announcement of the unit, several variations of the insignia started appearing on Ukrainian media outlets. This included Promote Ukraine. This rendition featured a simplified design, retaining the Karelian colours but omitting the Viking ship and other Nordic patterns and insignia. The inscription "Karjala" was retained, and a Cyrillic abbreviation of the battalion was added at the bottom, along with the unit's nickname: "Vaseli Levonen". There was also an unofficial variant of the insignia that was displayed in a roundel, with the name of the battalion in Karelian at the top, and the name in Russian on the bottom.

==== Visual insignias ====
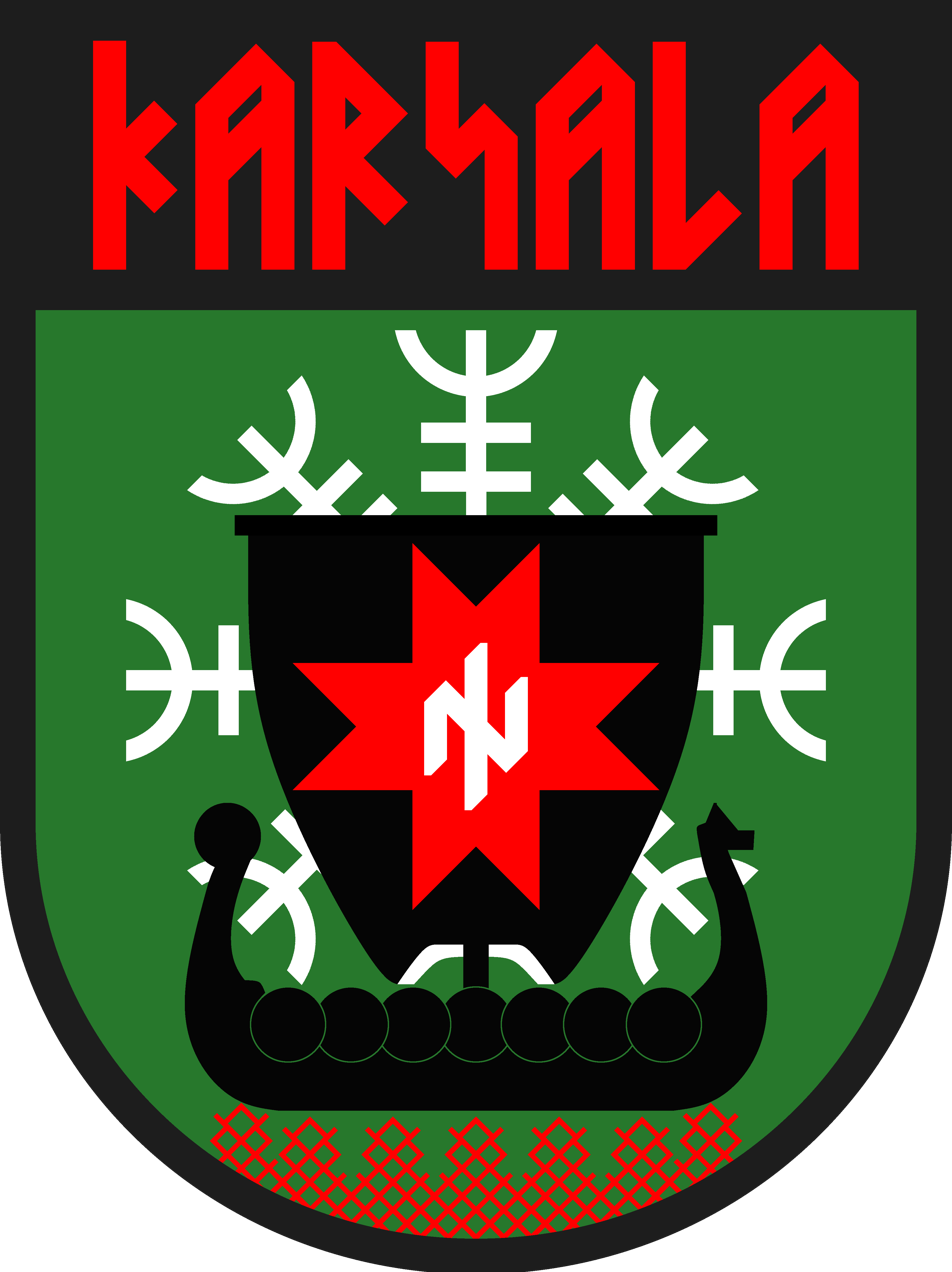
First official variant of the battalion's insignia, first seen in January 2023.

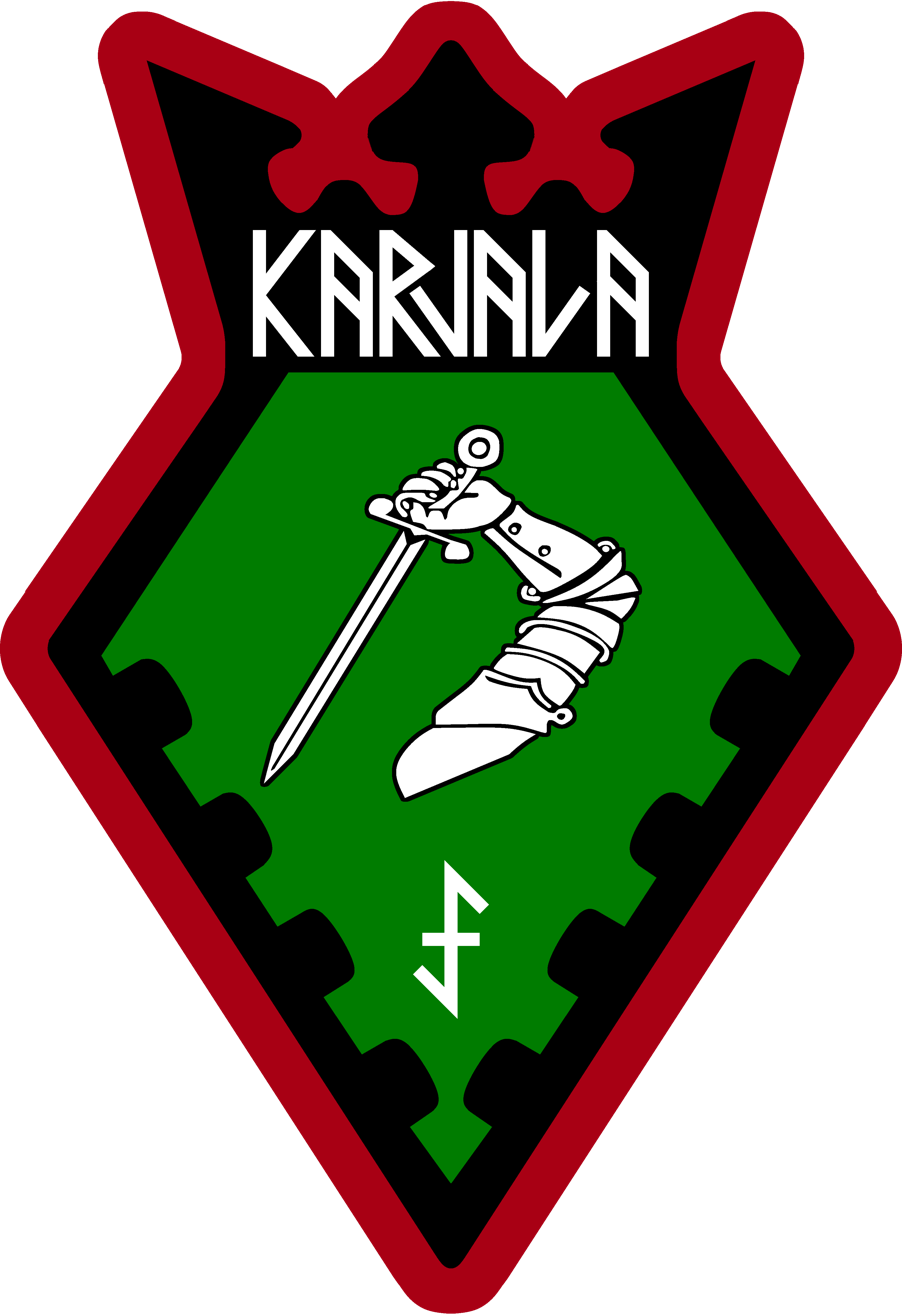
Second official, and current, variant of the battalion's insignia, first seen in October 2023.

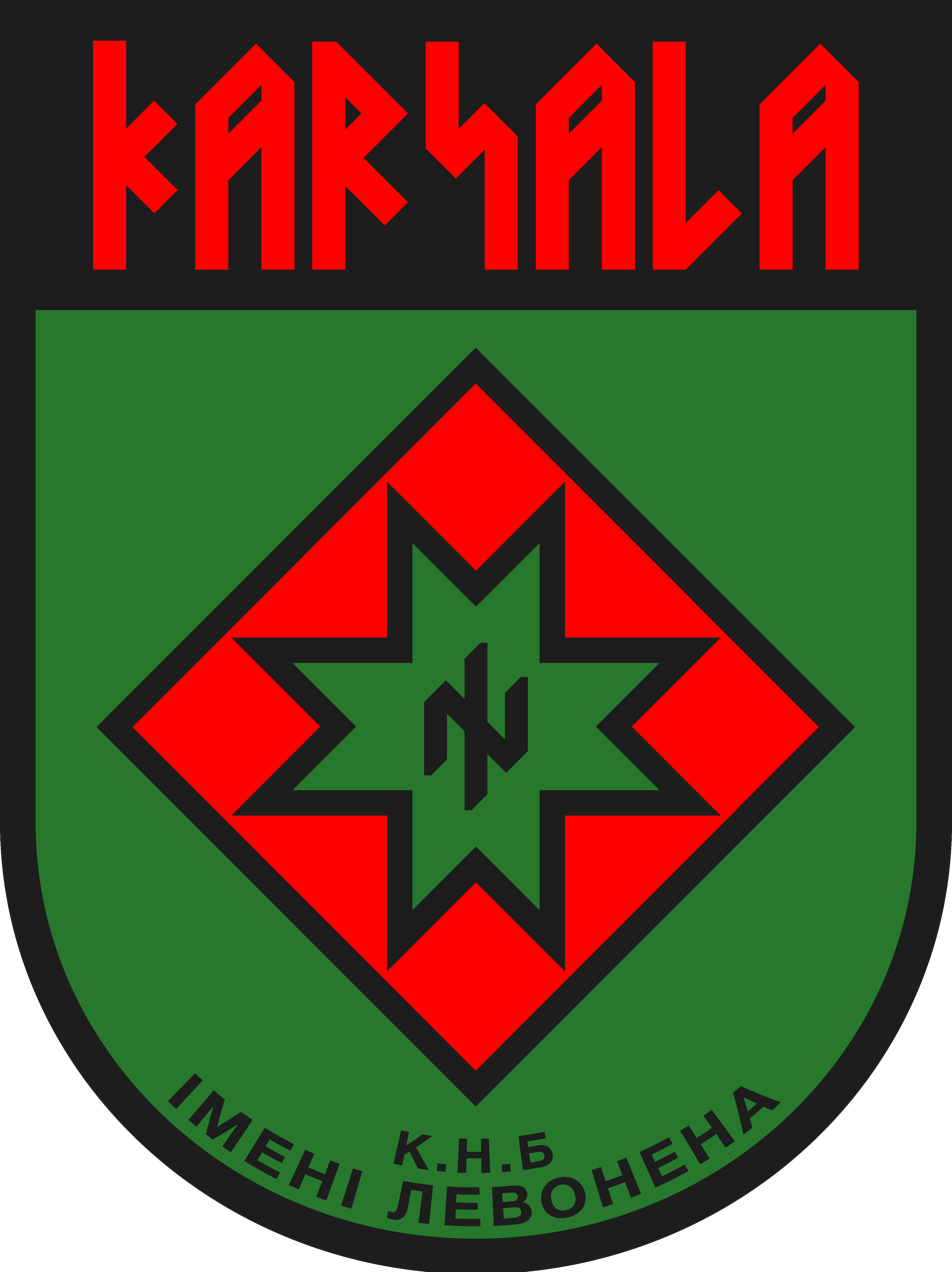
First unofficial variant of the battalion's insignia, first seen across news reports from January 2023 and beyond.

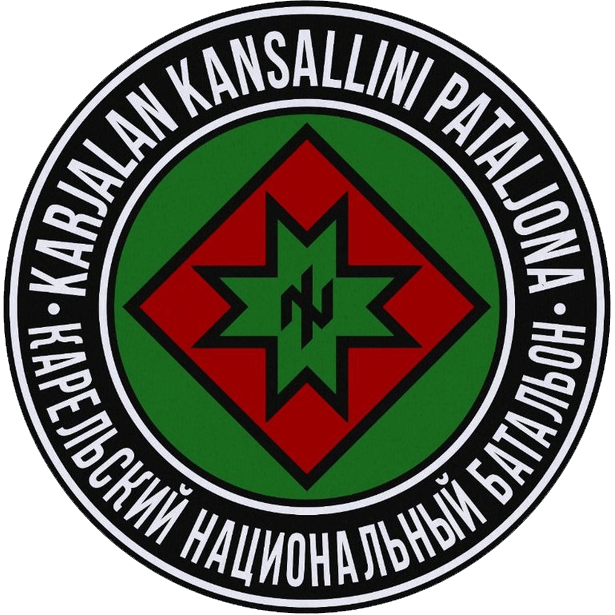
Second unofficial variant of the battalion's insignia depicted as a roundel, similarly, seen across news reports on the unit.

=== Activities and operations ===
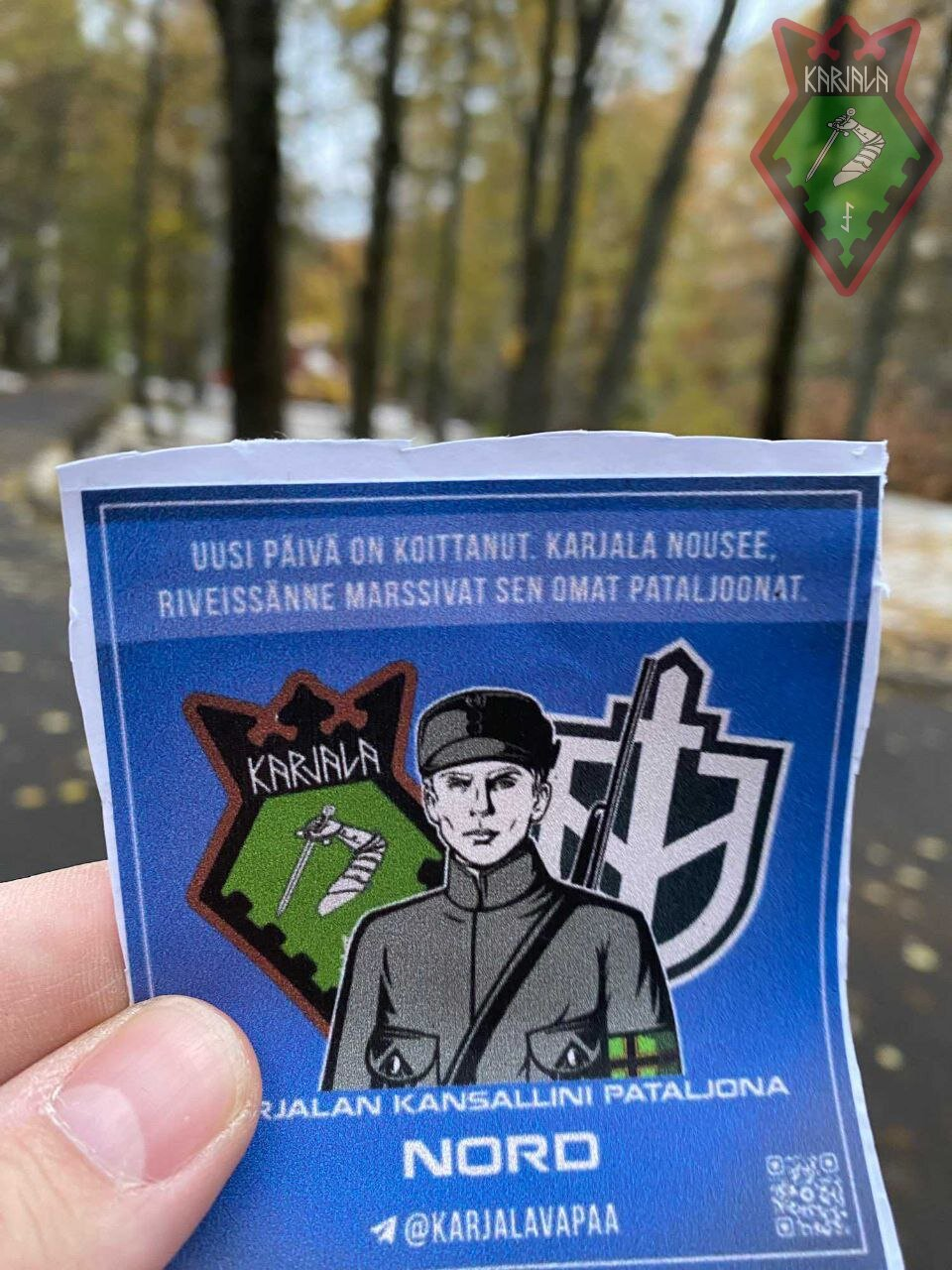
A sticker reading (in Finnish): "A new day has dawned. Karelia is rising, her own battalions march among your ranks."

According to Russian media The Moscow Times, the Karelian Group predominantly operates in exile within neighbouring Finland, this was triggered as a result of members of the Karelian National Movement fleeing Russia after the full-scale Russian invasion; it can be presumed that the members in exile formed the unit in Finland. Some members occasionally head back home to Karelia, which often causes clashes with the local Russian Federal Security Service agents, who regularly arrest and charge these members for alleged "ethnic nationalism" and "inciting treason."

The unit also takes part in information warfare in Karelia by spreading fliers and stickers in the region.

Reportedly, by Ukraina Moloda, the battalion noted that during the Winter War between the Soviet Union and Finland, Ukrainian units defended the territory of Karelia on the side of the Armed Forces of Finland while being commanded by the former Holnodyarsk chieftain, lieutenant colonel of the Ukrainian People's Army, Yuriy Gorlis-Gorsky.

The Ukrainian magazine Focus claimed that an unidentified Russian source suggested the idea that Finland could potentially resemble a "second Ukraine". This association is drawn in connection with the presence of various Finnish groups and the increasing influence of independence and nationalist movements, such as the Karelian National Movement and the Karelian Group, operating within and outside of Finland.

It had been observed by Iltalehti, a Finnish tabloid, that engaging in Karelian activism and nationalism may carry severe legal consequences for those involved. These include a ten-year prison sentence for merely denigrating the Russian Armed Forces, and allegedly extended periods of imprisonment. In addition to this, expressions of support for Ukraine and the involvement in activities perceived as hindering "Russia's actions" may escalate resulting in a sentence of up to 20 years.

In a report featured by Iltalehti, a sticker associated with the Karelian Group was presented as a means of disseminating information about the unit itself. The same sticker was also showcased on an Estonian website called "Koiduaeg," calling itself a "national news and opinions portal". According to the source, the sticker read, "A new day has dawned. Karelia is rising, her own battalions are marching in line".

== Affiliations ==
=== Affiliation with the Karelian National Movement ===
The Karelian National Movement played a crucial role in raising funds for the battalion. As of 2024, the battalion is still a part of the Karelian National Movement.

=== Affiliation with the Russian Volunteer Corps ===
The battalion is most likely incorporated within the structure of the Russian Volunteer Corps, similar to the Polish and German Volunteer Corps which have emerged alongside it in its operations and also helped to actively train and promote their units. The unit has made publications, showing its affiliation with the Russian Volunteer Corps through media such as stickers and brochures.

On 9 November 2023, the Russian Volunteer Corps was involved in the assassination of a Federal Security Service Lieutenant Colonel in Bryansk Oblast. The Karelian National Battalion posted on Telegram in late January 2024 stating that they had also been involved in the assassination.

On 18 January 2024, the Russian Volunteer Corps conducted a raid within Bryansk Oblast, located in Russia. The unit destroyed a Russian Ural military truck carrying personnel, the news was confirmed by a non-verified source in the Ukrainian Main Directorate of Intelligence Service. It was alleged by the battalion itself on Telegram that volunteers of the unit also participated in the raid.

Since January 2026, The Karelian Group left the Russian Volunteer Corps due to ideological differences and disbanded as a singular military unit, with members joining other units and troops while still maintaining Nord membership.

== Russo-Ukrainian war ==
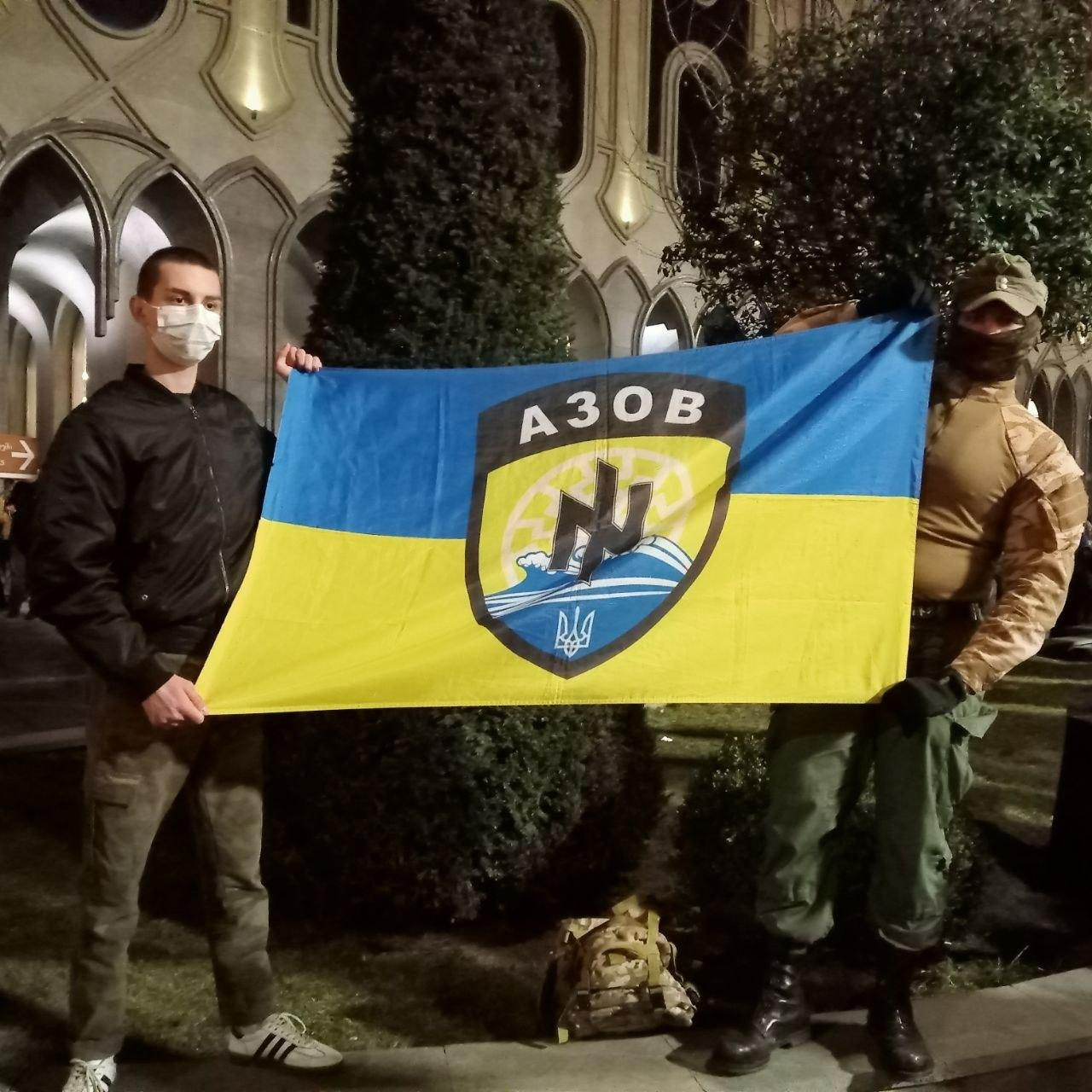
Karelian fighters holding a flag of the Azov Battalion.

=== Russian invasion of Ukraine ===
Recruitment of the unit begun in early January 2023, with a criterion for volunteers being outlined by the unit on their Telegram channel. A photo of the unit published on their Telegram channel indicates that the unit were present in Ukraine by 24 February 2023. The official number of volunteers in Ukraine or elsewhere is unknown.

After the Russian invasion of Ukraine, activism in Karelia and Ingria has gained increased prominence—particularly directed towards freeing Karelia from what is perceived as Russian imperialism to them. The nature of these actions has exposed activists to potential risks and challenges, such as imprisonment and prosecution. In a notable photograph, activists affiliated with the Karelian National Movement are depicted wearing combat gear and holding Kalashnikov rifles while proudly displaying the flag of Karelia. The Ingrian Finnish flag is also often seen in the hands of activists.

A photograph belonging to the unit was present in an article by Koiduaeg, featuring the Karelian flag alongside military equipment, including a plate carrier, a traditional Ukrainian cap, and military boots. The caption acknowledge the tactical discretion exercised by the volunteers of the unit, stating "Due to tactical reasons, the volunteers of Karelia cannot express the full extent of their contribution in Ukraine."

=== Combat Operations ===
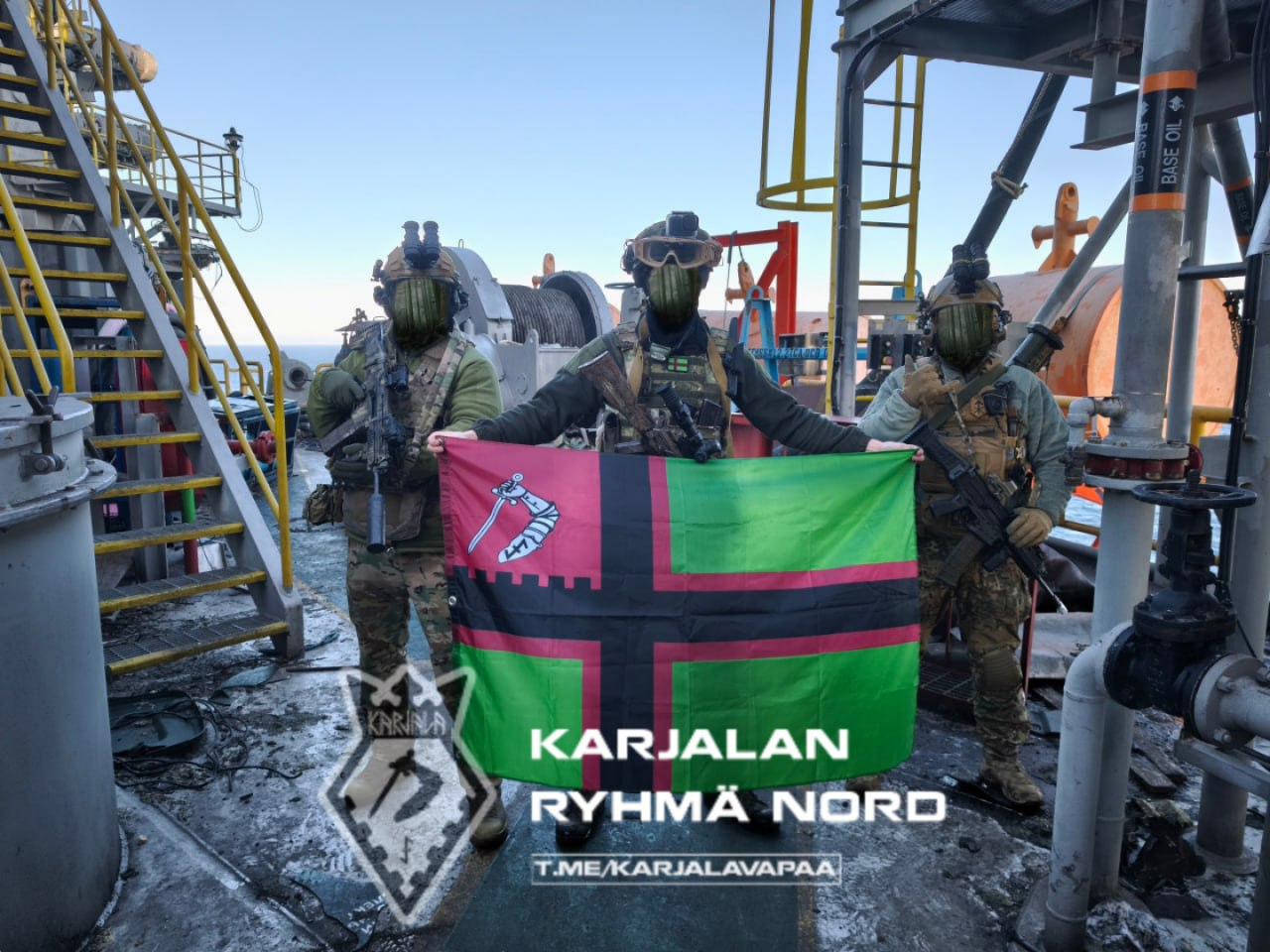
Karelian Group fighters on an oil rig in the Black Sea (March 2025)

The Karelian National Battalion has engaged in multiple combat operations, the Karelian National Battalion has performed incursions into Kursk Oblast and Belgorod Oblast alongside the Russian Volunteer Corps.

In January and February of 2025, units of the battalion participated in the recapture of several Ukrainian oil rigs in the Black Sea that had been occupied by the Russian Armed Forces.

== See also ==
- Separatism in Russia
- Attacks in Russia during the Russian invasion of Ukraine
- Rusich Group
