= Het Gesprek =

Dutch television channel

Het Gesprek (Dutch for "The Conversation") was a Dutch television channel, started on 2 October 2007. The channel offered interviews and debates, broadcast in the evenings.

Founders of the television channel were Dutch journalists Frits Barend, Ruud Hendriks and Derk Sauer. Barend is known for producing several successful sports and current event programs on television and radio with fellow journalist Henk van Dorp.

The channel used various "conversationalists" for the interviews, ranging from politicians and television personalities to actors and authors. The channel also broadcast the Late Show with David Letterman on Weekdays at 11:00 p.m.

Due to financial problems Het Gesprek stopped broadcasting on 21 August 2010.
