= Flag of the Karelo-Finnish Soviet Socialist Republic =

Flag of the U.S.S.R. republic of Karelia

Karelo-Finnish Soviet Socialist Republic
- Use: Civil and state flag, civil and state ensign
- Proportion: 1:2
- Adopted: 1 September 1953; 73 years ago
- Relinquished: 20 August 1956; 70 years ago
- Design: A plain red flag with the golden hammer and sickle with a red star with the blue and green stripes on the bottom
- Reverse flag
- Use: Civil and state flag, civil and state ensign
- Flag from 1940 to 1953
- Use: Civil and state flag, civil and state ensign
- Proportion: 1:2
- Adopted: 9 June 1940; 86 years ago
- Relinquished: 1 September 1953; 73 years ago
- Design: A plain red flag with the golden hammer and sickle in the top-left corner, and the Latin characters "Karjalais-Suomalainen SNT" with "Карело-Финская ССР" below them in gold in a sans-serif font

The flag of the Karelo-Finnish Soviet Socialist Republic was adopted by the Karelo-Finnish SSR on 1 September 1953. The flag's design was based on the flag of the former Soviet Union, with the additional horizontal blue (1:6 width), and green (1:5 width) bands added at the bottom. At the top of the flag near the flagpole were a golden hammer and sickle and the red star with a gold border. The green color symbolized the forest resources, and blue represented the abundance of rivers and lakes.

== Color scheme ==
Karelo-Finnish SSR	Red	Azure	Gold	Green
RGB	205/0/0	51/181/255	255/217/0	0/154/48
Hexadecimal	#CD0000	#33b5ff	#FFD900	#009a30
CMYK	0/100/100/20	80/29/0/0	0/15/100/0	85/13/100/2

== History ==
In 1940, the Karelo-Finnish SSR was created after the Winter War. This made Finnish the second official language of Karelia, while Karelian lost its official status. In June 1940, the flag was created, which was a red background with a gold hammer and sickle in the top-left corner, and the Latin characters Karjalais-Suomalainen SNT (Karjalais-Suomalainen Sosialistinen Neuvostotasavalta) with Карело-Финская ССР (Карело-Финская Советская Социалистическая Республика) below them in gold in a sans-serif font.

A 1947 proposal featured exactly the same design as the flag adopted in 1953 except with the abbreviations K.-S.S.N.T. and К.-Ф.С.С.Р. in gold in a sans-serif font below the gold hammer and sickle. The proposal also featured a line of black stylized trees on the blue line which would have made it stand out among SSR flags.

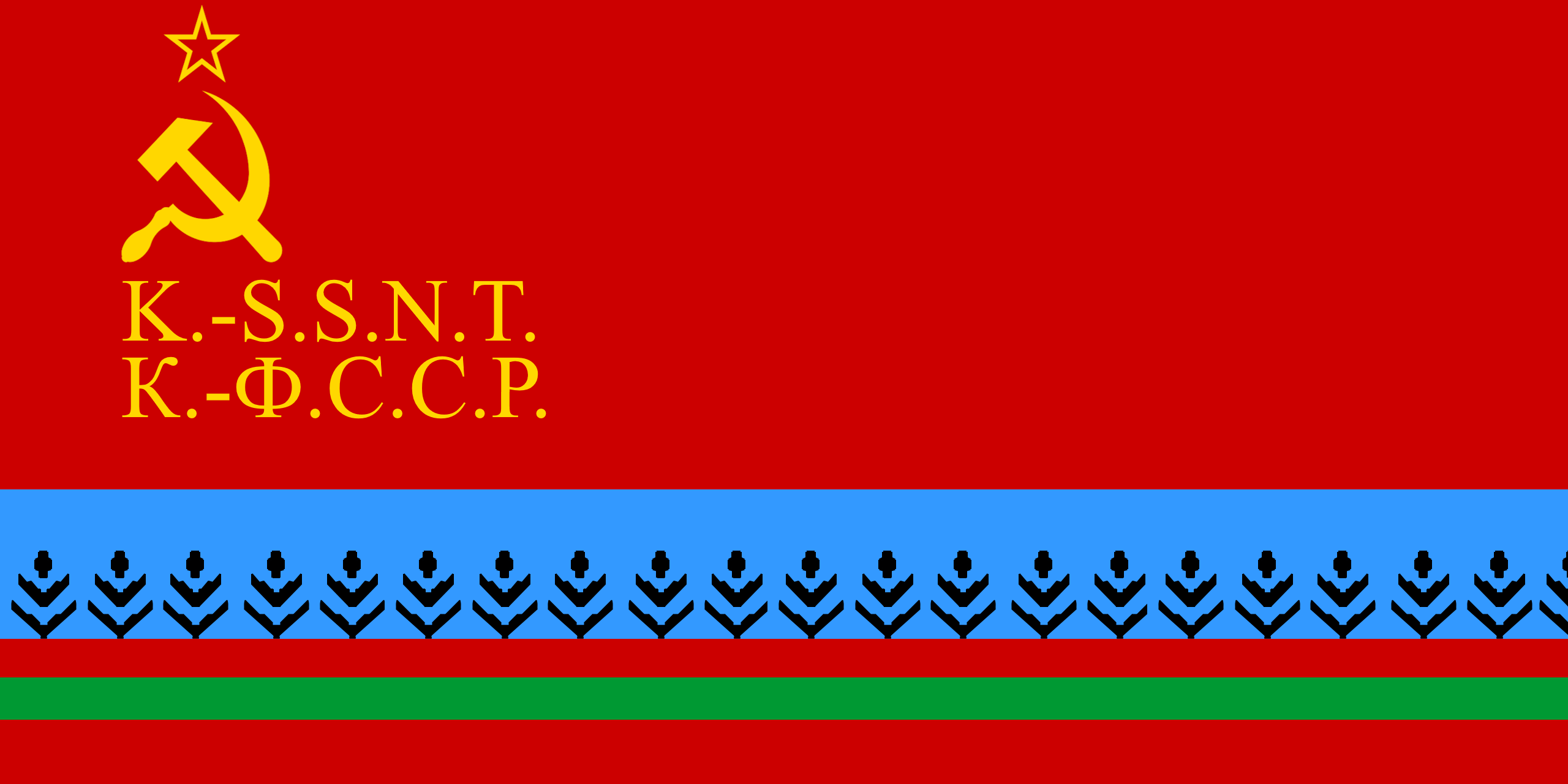
Proposed 1947 flag

Proposed 1947 flag (second version)

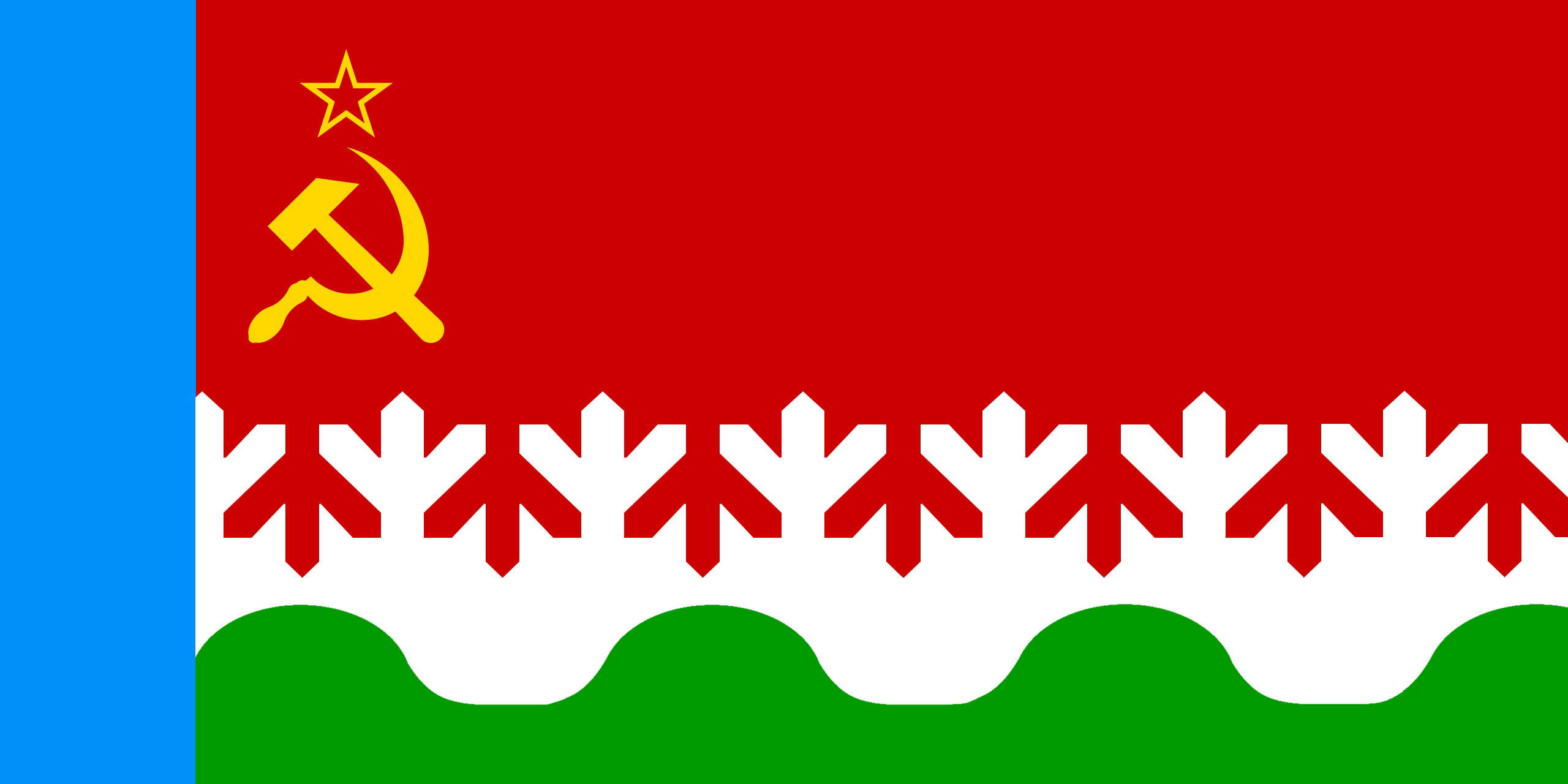
Proposed 1976 flag

Proposed 1976 flag (second version)

On 1 September 1953, a new flag was adopted, it was a tricolour with a red stripe, a blue stripe, which made up 1:6 on the flag's height, and a green stripe, which made up 1:5 of the flag's height. On the red stripe, top left in the corner near the shaft there is a golden hammer and sickle and under them a red five-pointed star, framed by a golden border.

In 1956, Karelia became an autonomous republic of the RSFSR again and had to change its flag, which was adopted on 20 August 1956. The flag had a red background with a blue stripe 1:8 of the flag's length on the left, in the upper left corner of the red background a golden sickle and a hammer and above them a red five-pointed a star framed by a golden border was depicted. Under them the words Karelian ASSR were written in Russian and Finnish.

== See also ==
- Flag of Finland
- Flag of the Republic of Karelia
- Emblem of the Karelo-Finnish Soviet Socialist Republic

== Sources ==
Paškov, Aleksandr Mihailovitš (1994). Karjalan vaakunat ja liput. Petrozavodsk: KAREKO. ISBN 5-88129-010-0.
