= Ivan Nechepurenko =

Russian journalist

Ivan Sergeyevich Nechepurenko (Russian: Иван Сергеевич Нечепуренко) is a Ukrainian writer and journalist. Born in St Petersburg in 1986, he lives in Moscow and serves as a reporter for The New York Times. His writings have also been published by The Moscow Times (reprinted by The Guardian), The Aspen Institute, Kyiv Post, The Insider, GQ Russia and Slon.ru website. Nechepurenko has closely collaborated with The International Crisis Group and appeared on the BBC, CBC, France 24, CTV, i24news among other media outlets. He travels widely inside and outside Russia, interviewing many prominent figures. He wrote extensively on Russia's image in the West and specialized in writing about Russian culture, politics, and foreign policy. Nechepurenko earned a bachelor's degree from the University of Calgary, where he studied under John Ferris, and a master's degree at the London School of Economics and Political Science, where he studied under Roy Allison.
