= Vossius Gymnasium =

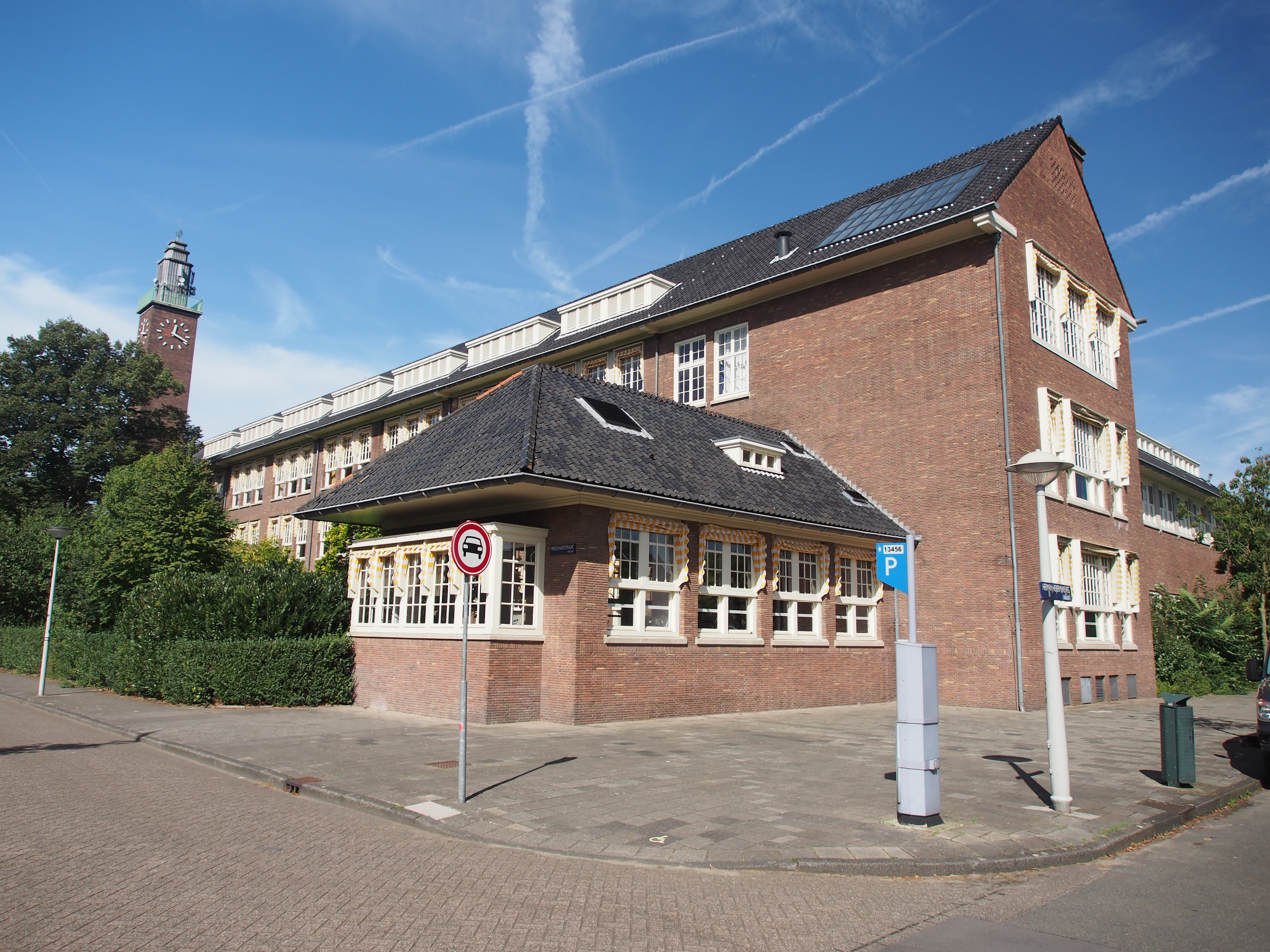

Location
- Messchaertstraat 1 Amsterdam, North Holland, 1077 WS; Netherlands
- Coordinates: 52.3459°N 4.8843°E

Information
- Type: Public gymnasium
- Motto: Latin: Sine labore nihil (Without work nothing)
- Established: 1926
- Rector: Jan van Muilekom
- Age range: 12–18
- Colour: Red
- Song: Carmen Vossianum
- Publication: Vulpes; Aloopex (also publishes a set of videos each year, known as the "Aloopex Paasjournaal")
- Website: www.vossius.nl

Vossius Gymnasium is a public gymnasium in Amsterdam, North Holland, Netherlands. It was established in 1926 and is named after Gerardus Vossius. In 2014, it was ranked best VWO school in Amsterdam and 4th in the country by RTL Nieuws. It is also consistently ranked among the best in the country in terms of final exam results.

== History ==
The gymnasium school type in the Netherlands originates from the “Latijnse school” (Latin school), a medieval school type for the upper class where Latin, an essential language for studying at university, was taught. The school originates from the in 1342 established “Hoofdschool”, which in the 16th century became the “Latijnse School”, which in turn became the “Amsterdam Stedelijk Gymnasium” in 1847. With growing demand for higher education, the Ignatius Gymnasium was founded in 1895, and in the 1926, the “Amsterdam Stedelijk Gymnasium” was split into the Barlaeus Gymnasium and the Vossius Gymnasium with the latter claiming the earlier dates of foundation. In 2005, Het 4e Gymnasium and the Cygnus Gymnasium were added, bringing the number of gymnasia in Amsterdam to five.

== Notable alumni ==
- Frits Barend, journalist, radio and television presenter
- Arnon Grunberg, writer and journalist
- Gerard Reve, writer
- Rob du Bois, composer, pianist and jurist
- Rogier van Otterloo, composer and conductor
- Karel van het Reve, writer, translator and literary historian, teaching and writing on Russian literature
- Renate Rubinstein, writer, journalist and columnist
- Igor Sijsling, professional tennis player

== Notable staff ==
- Arnold Heertje, economist, professor, writer and columnist
- Jacques Presser, historian, writer and poet
