= Eva Hartog =

Dutch journalist

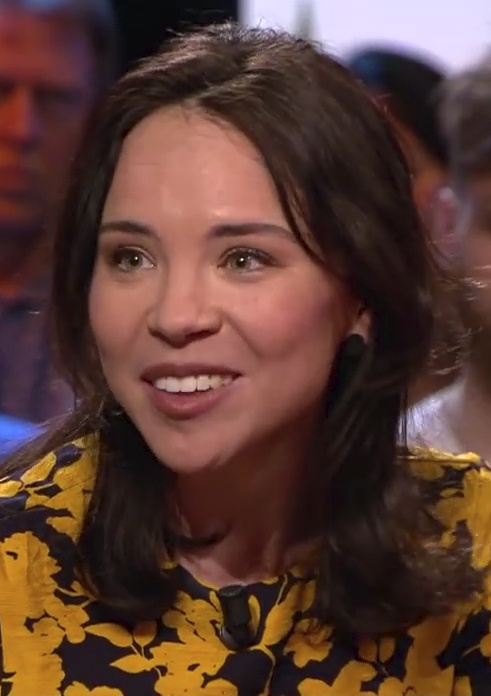
- Born: 1988 (age 37–38)
- Occupation: Journalist
- Organization: The Moscow Times

Eva Hartog is a Dutch journalist and contributor to De Groene Amsterdammer and Politico Europe. She joined the English language Moscow-based newspaper, The Moscow Times, in 2013 at the age of 25 going on to serve as the publication's editor in chief between 2017 and 2019.

== Early life ==
Eva Hartog is the child of a Dutch father, who translates books from Russian into Dutch, and a Russian mother. She grew up in Spain. Hartog studied liberal arts and sciences at University College Utrecht and political philosophy at the University of Leiden.

== Career ==
In 2013 she moved to Moscow to work as an English language journalist for The Moscow Times, writing both for the expatriate community in the Russian capital and for internationally based readers. In 2017 she was appointed editor in chief of the newspaper. At around the same time, the newspaper cancelled its regular print edition in order to concentrate on its online presence. The occasional print edition continued to appear on an irregular basis. She resigned her post as editor in chief in 2019.

Alongside her work for The Moscow Times, Hartog has bylines in Politico Europe, De Groene Amsterdammer and Time. She also appears on various media channels, including the Dutch television programme Buitenhof and De Wereld Draait Door as a "Russia clarifier".

She was expelled from Russia in August 2023.
