= Derk Sauer =

Dutch journalist (1952–2025)

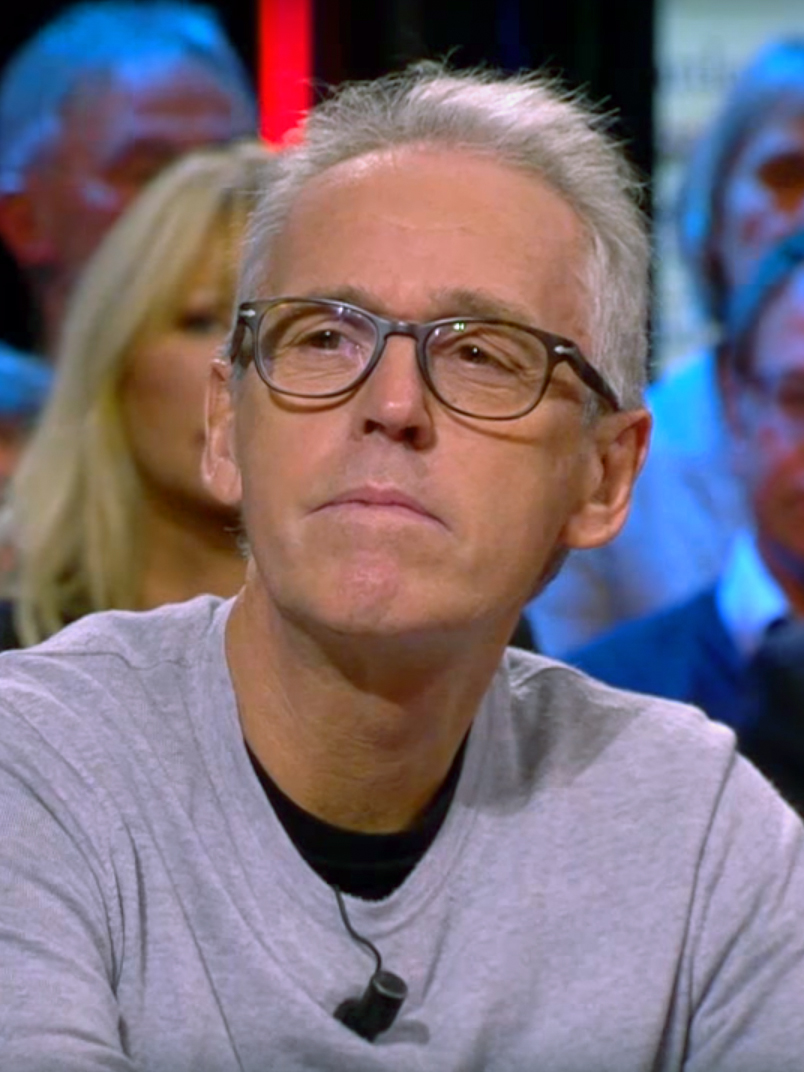
- Sauer in 2017
- Born: 31 October 1952; Amsterdam, Netherlands
- Died: 31 July 2025 (aged 72); Domburg, Netherlands
- Occupation: Media proprietor
- Political party: Socialist Party

Derk Sauer (31 October 1952 – 31 July 2025) was a Dutch journalist and media proprietor who was the founder of The Moscow Times.

== Early life and education ==
Sauer took his Hogere Burgerschool final exams in 1969 at the Casimir Lyceum in Amstelveen and, as a student, worked for director Gied Jaspars on the VPRO program Morgen. At the age of 14, he founded the "Action Group for World Peace" and organized a demonstration in Amstelveen against the Warsaw Pact invasion of Czechoslovakia. After a short period working at the Maple Leaf chewing gum factory, he permanently moved into journalism.

== Career ==
Sauer began his journalistic career at De Tribune—the party newspaper of what was then KEN (ml), now the Socialist Party (SP), when Koos van Zomeren was editor-in-chief there.

In 1970, at the age of 19, Sauer went to Northern Ireland to report on The Troubles for, among others, VPRO radio and De Groene Amsterdammer. In Belfast, he rented a room from the local IRA commander on New Lodge Road, an IRA stronghold.

In the early 1970s, he worked with journalist Fons Burger for the VVDM’s monthly magazine Twintig. Starting in 1975, Sauer and Burger wrote as a duo for the weekly magazine Nieuwe Revu. Together with Adriaan Monshouwer, they also founded "Tilt Film" and, along with Bob Visser, created the VPRO TV program NEON. For BBC Panorama, they traveled from Hanoi to Saigon, filmed in Kurdistan and with the Khmer Rouge in Cambodia, and produced the documentary Een Koninkrijk voor een Huis ("A Kingdom for a House") about the squatters' riots during the inauguration of Queen Beatrix.

From 1982 to 1989, Sauer was editor-in-chief of Nieuwe Revu. Under his leadership, well-known journalists, columnists, and cartoonists such as Frits Barend, Henk van Dorp, Boudewijn Büch, Henk Spaan, Ischa Meijer, Karel Glastra van Loon, Gerrit de Jager, and Erwin Olaf also joined the magazine.

=== In Russia ===
At the end of 1989, Derk Sauer moved to Moscow with his wife, Ellen Verbeek, and their young son at the invitation of VNU to set up a joint venture with the Moscow branch of the Russian Journalists' Union. The goal was to launch the first Russian glossy magazine, Moscow Magazine. According to Sauer, however, his Russian colleagues turned out not to be journalists but KGB agents.

In 1992, VNU withdrew from Russia, and Sauer and his business partner Annemarie van Gaal decided to stay. Together with the Novamedia group, they founded the publishing company Independent Media in 1992. That same year, they launched the English-language daily The Moscow Times. Initially, the paper was distributed for free, but when it switched to paid subscriptions, Sauer and Van Gaal continued to incur losses despite its popularity. Van Gaal then entered into a joint venture with Hearst to publish Cosmopolitan in Russian, with Ellen Verbeek becoming co-editor-in-chief. Russian editions of Playboy, FHM, Harper's Bazaar, Good Housekeeping, Esquire, and Men's Health followed, turning Independent Media into an international multimedia company and eventually a market leader in Russia.

In 1999, Sauer launched the business newspaper Vedomosti in a joint venture with the Financial Times and The Wall Street Journal.

In 2005 Sauer sold The Moscow Times to the Finnish Sanoma for €142 million.

In April 2005, Sauer founded the publishing house Nieuw Amsterdam. In 2014, he sold his 50 percent stake to the Novamedia Group.

In 2007, Sauer, together with Frits Barend, Ruud Hendriks, and Pieter Storms, started Het Gesprek—a TV channel dedicated exclusively to interviews and debates.

In January 2010, Sauer, along with the investment company Egeria, acquired the newspapers NRC Handelsblad and nrc.next from PCM Publishers. Due to Sauer’s influence on the editorial direction, Birgit Donker resigned as editor-in-chief of NRC Handelsblad as of 1 July 2010. Sauer believed that newspapers no longer played a role in reporting breaking news—since other media were faster—but should instead focus more on providing background and analysis. In 2014, Sauer was removed from the supervisory board by the main shareholder, Egeria.

=== Persecution by Russian authorities ===
In 2012, Sauer was invited by liberal oligarch Mikhail Prokhorov to take the lead at his media company RBK. Sauer assembled a new team headed by journalist Liza Osetinskaya, with whom he had formerly worked at Vedomosti. The new editorial direction attracted a large readership, but the Kremlin increased pressure on owner Prokhorov to intervene. In 2015, Sauer stepped down as director of RBK and became vice president of its parent company, ONEXIM.

After RBK published reports in 2016 on the "Panama Papers" and Vladimir Putin's involvement, masked agents raided Prokhorov’s offices and seized stacks of documents. Several Russian media outlets reported that Sauer was under investigation for fraud, allegedly related to a 2014 share transaction. Sauer dismissed the accusations as "nonsense," suggesting the Russian authorities were likely unhappy with his media companies’ reporting: "The moment they find a company or person bothersome, they dig up some case. This is how thousands of entrepreneurs have ended up in jail."

In 2017, Sauer bought back The Moscow Times. At that point, he immediately transitioned the publication to a fully digital format. He did not expect to make money from the project and saw it primarily as a contribution to press freedom in Russia. He claimed that the paper could serve as a great medium for educating people abroad about underreported domestic subjects.

In 2020, Sauer launched a new Russian business platform, VTimes, together with former journalists from Vedomosti. By 2021, Russian authorities labeled VTimes a “foreign agent.”

In March 2022, a few weeks after the Russian invasion of Ukraine began, Sauer and colleagues relocated to Amsterdam. The Moscow Times was hosted by DPG Media. Soon after, the independent TV station TVRain (Dozhd) and journalists from the online channel Meduza joined them, turning Amsterdam into a safe haven for independent Russian journalism.

In January 2025, Sauer launched a music label together with Russian music journalist Artemy Troitsky and colleague Jennifer Duin, aimed at supporting bands and artists who are no longer allowed to perform in their home country.

== Political views ==
Sauer, a native of Amsterdam, considered himself a Maoist in the past, having participated in Dutch left-wing politics since his youth. He claimed that the 'Red May' student protests of Paris in 1968, which happened while he was 15 years old, informed much of his political beliefs. From the age of 17, Sauer was surveilled and wiretapped by the Dutch domestic intelligence service (BVD) for nearly 20 years. He later rejected communist ideology and described Mao Zedong as a "monster." He was a member of the Socialist Party of the Netherlands. In an interview with De Volkskrant in 2022, he stated that he was also a member of the Labour Party and Volt, and advocated for left-wing progressive cooperation.

== Personal life and death ==
Sauer was married to journalist Ellen Verbeek and had three children, one of them a journalist Pjotr Sauer, a reporter with the Guardian. He was a distant cousin of resistance fighter and England voyager Peter Tazelaar.

Sauer died at his home in Domburg on 31 July 2025, at the age of 72, from injuries sustained in a sailing accident in Corfu a few weeks earlier.
