= Karelian National Movement =

Separatist party in Russia

- KKL-Karjalan kansallinen liike KKL-Karjalan kanšallin liikeh
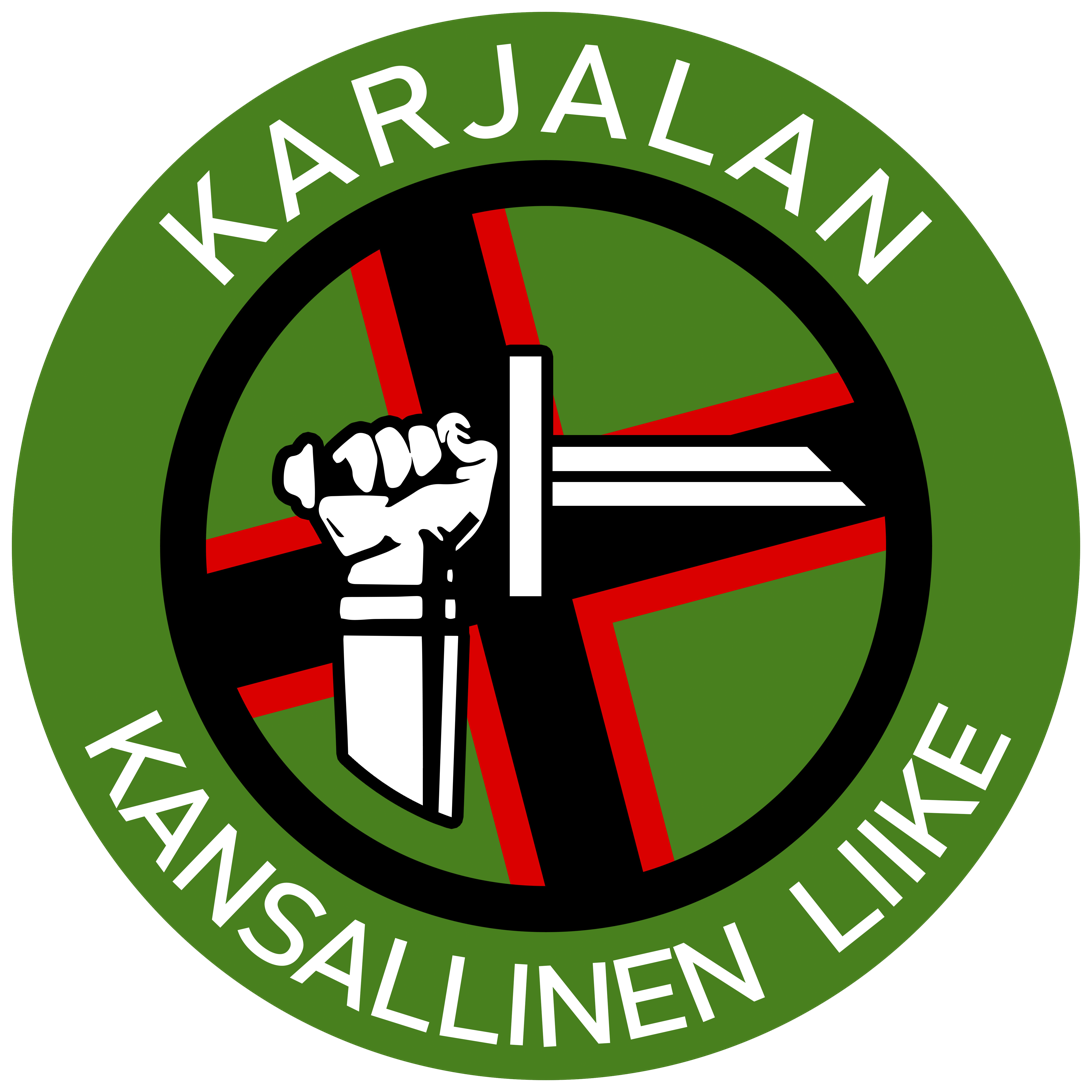
- Logo of the Oleynik faction of the organization

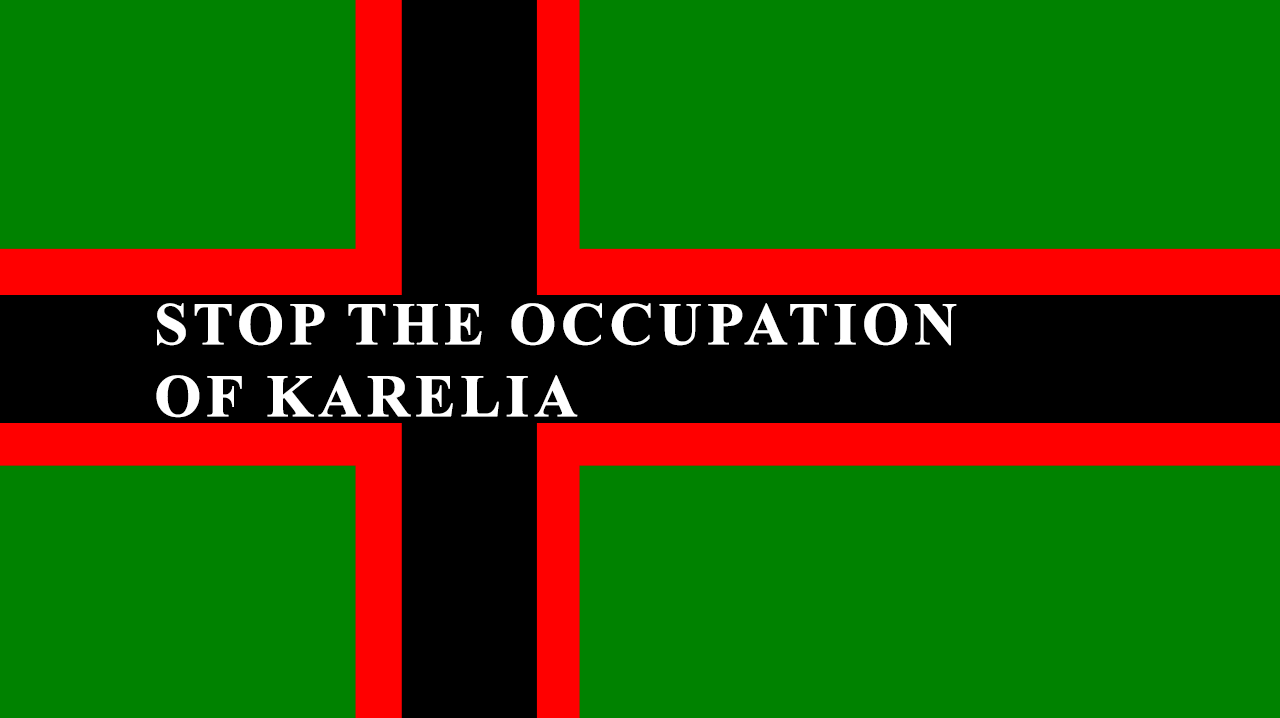
- Flag of the Kuznetsov faction of the organization
- Formation: 2012; 14 years ago 2022; 4 years ago (as the Karelian National Movement)
- Founder: Dmitry Kuznetsov
- Purpose: Separatism; Karelian nationalism Kuznetsov faction: Ethnic nationalism
- Headquarters: Tartu
- Location(s): Estonia Russia, Republic of Karelia
- Head of the Kuznetsov faction: Dmitry Kuznetsov
- Head of the Oleynik faction: Vladislav Oleynik
- Military unit: Karelian National Battalion (Oleynik faction)
- Affiliations: Free Nations of Post-Russia Forum; Conservative People's Party of Estonia; Finnish far-right organizations
- Staff: 25+ (2023)
- Website: Kuznetsov faction: Official Website; Oleynik faction: Official Website
- Formerly called: Karelian National Liberation Movement

The Karelian National Movement (Russian: Карельское национальное движение, romanized: Karelskoye natsional'noye dvizheniye; Finnish: Karjalan kansallinen liike; Karelian: Karjalan kanšallin liikeh), officially KKL-Stop the Occupation of Karelia is an umbrella term for two organizations that split from each other in 2023. The organization led by the original creator, Dmitry Kuznetsov, who also goes by the name Miteri Panfilov, is called Stop the Occupation of Karelia (Finnish: Lopeta Karjalan Valtaus); it was previously known as the Karelian National Liberation Movement. The organization led by Vladislav Oleynik is called the Karelian National Movement.

Both of the organizations are far-right Karelian separatist groups, dating back to 2012 under the name Stop the Occupation of Karelia.

Some Finnish and Russian journalists and politicians believe that the organization was used in information warfare.

== History ==
=== Establishment ===
The movement was founded in 2012 under the name Stop the Occupation of Karelia by Dmitry Kuznetsov. In 2014 a website under the same name was created that advocated for the full independence of Karelia. The website was banned by Roskomnadzor in 2015. In 2016 Dmitry Kuznetsov gained political asylum in Spain after being prosecuted in Russia for separatism. At the point of prosecution, he had already been living in Spain for more than 2 years. The leader of the Karelian Republican Movement, Vadim Shtepa, refused to cooperate with the KNM, citing their ethnocentrism as the reason. He also stated that the Karelian National Movement has no future due to their extreme nationalism and complete misunderstanding of the current situation in the Republic of Karelia.

On 6 June 2023, the Karelian National Movement was registered in Tartu, Estonia as a non-profit organization.

On 20 July 2023, the Karelian National Movement was dissolved as a solid entity after an internal conflict within the organization.

On 15 November 2023, the Karelian National Movement of Oleynik demanded Kuznetsov to stop the conflict and to return control of the original Telegram channel, after that demand the Karelian National Liberation Movement of Kuznetsov was renamed back to Stop the Occupation of Karelia.

=== Activities ===
The movement became active again after the Russian invasion of Ukraine and changed its name to the current one. It gained new members, many of whom were parts of right-wing movements, as Vladislav Oleynik, the administrator of a right-wing online group called "Væringjavegr ᛝ Fennoscandia". He became the head of international relations of the organization.

The movement also became part of the Free Nations of Post-Russia Forum. The KKL was in a conflict with the Finnish Karjalan Liitto organization, which represents Karelian evacuees in Finland, due to their refusal to cooperate with the KKL to "return” Karelia. The movement tried to establish contacts with Karelian organizations in the Republic of Karelia.

The KKL considers the Pomors one of the most related peoples, so they work closely with the organization "Pomoṙska Slobóda" (pomor. Помо́рьска Слобо́да), which advocates the independence of Pomorie.

On 9 May 2023, the KKL became one of the founding members of the Alliance of Indigenous Peoples, which advocates for implementation of "full sovereignty" for the native peoples of Russia and the countries of the former Soviet Union.

In 2023 the Oleynik wing of the organization helped organize a new organization named Suur-Suomen Sotilaat (Finnish: Soldiers of Greater Finland), aimed at dividing Russia into multiple Finno-Ugric republics, the new organization has close ties with far-right groups in Finland.

In spring 2024, the movement was designated as an 'undesirable organization' in Russia.

=== Relations with Karelian National Battalion ===
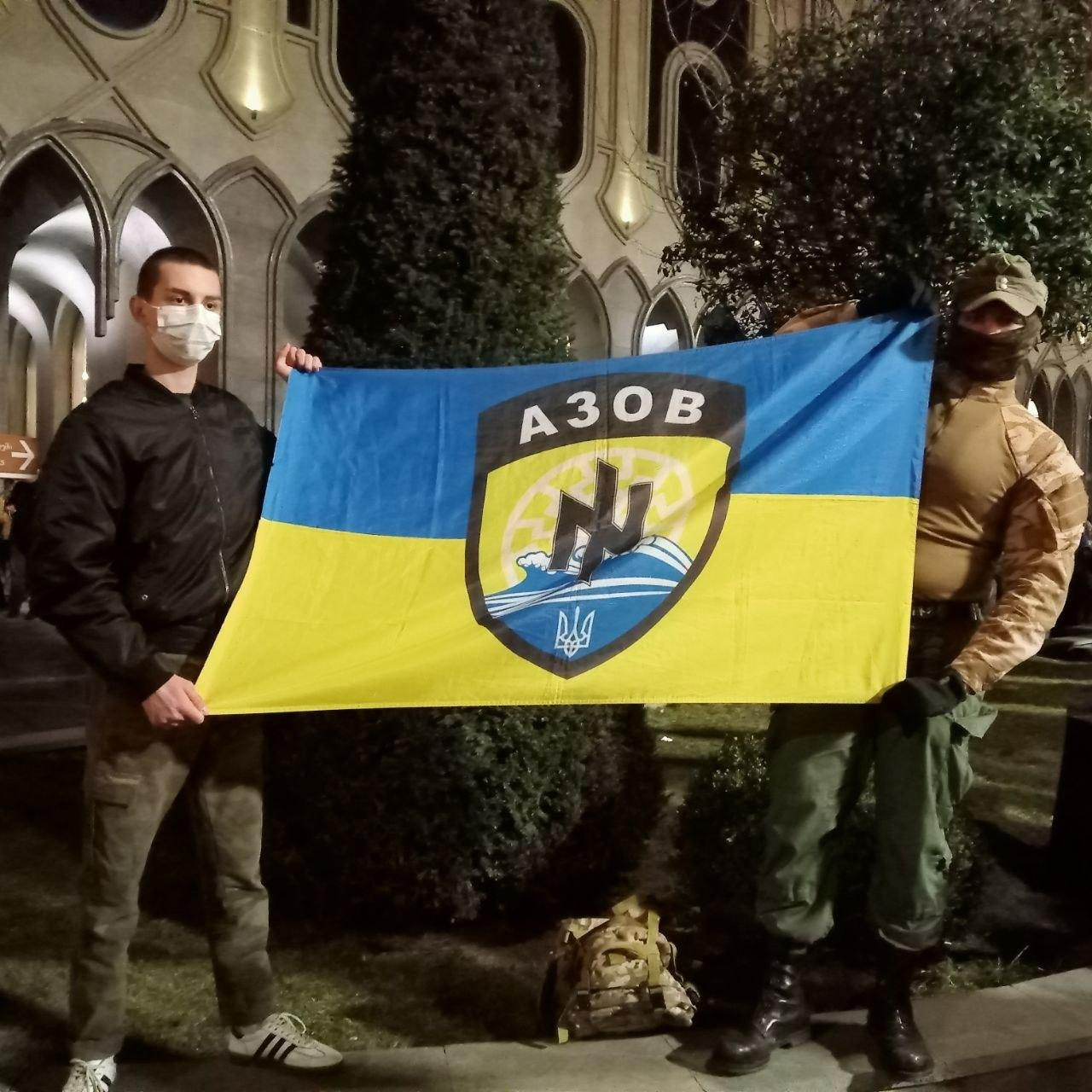
Fighters of the Karelian National Battalion

In January 2023 the Karelian National Movement organized a volunteer battalion that became a part of the International Legion of Territorial Defence of Ukraine.

Due to ideological differences on the position of the Russian Volunteer Corps and the Free Russia Legion in the Belgorod Incursions, on 7 June 2023, Dmitry Kuznetsov announced the cessation of communication between itself and the remaining members of the Karelian National Battalion. But Vladislav Oleynik later resumed their cooperation.

== Information warfare ==
Some Finnish and Karelian politicians and journalists called into question the legitimacy of the organization, seeing it as a part of the information warfare during the Russian invasion of Ukraine.

The Russian side believes that the organization was founded in order to stir up conflicts in the Republic of Karelia and create a narrative that Karelia wants to break away from Russia.

Some Finnish politicians and journalists believe that the organization was created by the Federal Security Service of Russia in order to stir up revanchism and nationalism in Finland. Finnish Security Intelligence Service believe that the movement doesn't pose a terrorist threat.

== Goals and position ==
=== Position of Stop the Occupation of Karelia ===
Stop the Occupation of Karelia seeks the creation of an independent Karelian state for Karelians, Finns, Vepsians, Pomors, Samis, Kola Norwegians based on traditional Nordic values. The Stop the Occupation of Karelia movement considered Russians to be the occupiers of Karelia and support their involvement in the movement, which is why they refused to cooperate with the Karelian Republican Movement, due to their more moderate position in 2010s. Stop the Occupation of Karelia opposed partisan activities in Karelia and expects the development of a scenario following the example of Slovenia during the breakup of Yugoslavia.

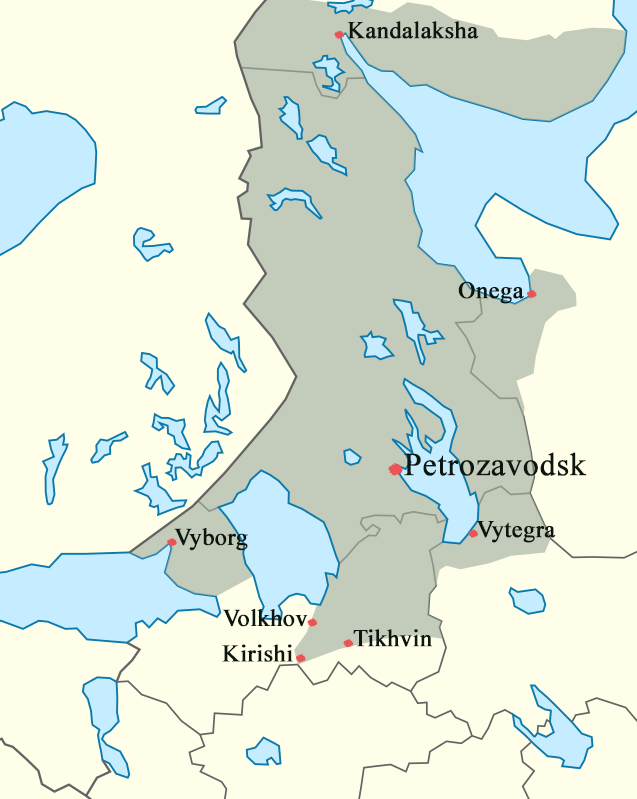
Territorial claims of Karelian National Movement

Stop the Occupation of Karelia also claims territories lost by Finland after the Winter War, including the city of Vyborg to be belonging to an independent Karelian state. Their claims also include Kandalaksha, the southeast of the Kola peninsula and the towns of Onega, Tikhvin and Vytegra and Kirishi.

=== Position of the Karelian National Movement ===
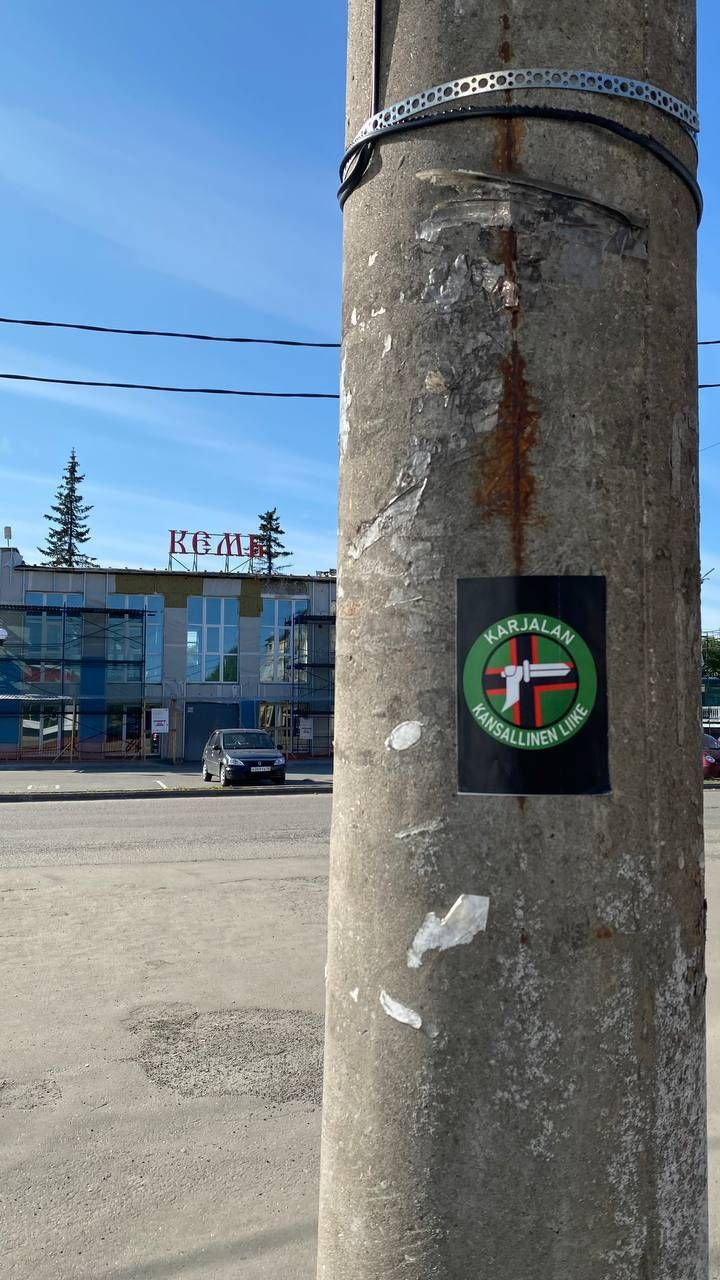
Karelian National Movement sticker on a pole in Karelia

The Karelian National Movement is a member of Suur-Suomen sotilaat, a pan-nationalist pan-Finnic movement. The Karelian National Movement wishes for the restoration of Karelian independence and with the creation of comfortable living conditions for the indigenous peoples, the Karelians, Vepsians, Sami and the Pomors. They wish to secure rights for the indigenous peoples to do traditional activities, such as fishing and hunting. They also wish to promote Karelian language and promote rights for the indigenous peoples, and give the indigenous peoples their own autonomous areas within Karelia. The Karelian National Movement is in favour of working with other movements in Karelia and Russia to secure independence for the Finno-Ugric peoples and republics of Russia.

The Karelian National Movement is also affiliated with the Conservative People's Party of Estonia and other Finnish pan-Finnic and conservative movements and organizations, such as: Uralin Lapset and Fight Club. The Karelian National Movement claims to be "anti-Neo-Bolshevik" and anti-Communist. The Karelian National Movement is pro-Western and wishes to secure relations with the Nordic countries upon the achievement of independence.

== See also ==
- Academic Karelia Society - Former Finnish nationalist and Finno-Ugric activist organization
- Republican Movement of Karelia - another Karelian regionalist and separatist organization
- Separatism in Russia
- Belarusian and Russian partisan movement (2022–present)
