= Jonas Heiska =

Finnish painter (1873–1937)

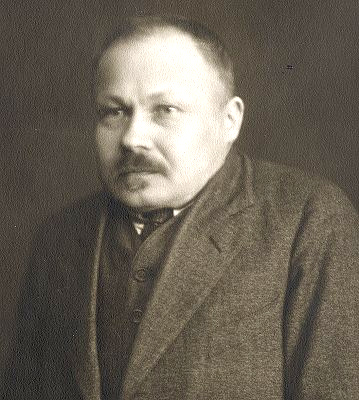
Jonas Heiska (1920s)

Jonas Heiska (13 October 1873 – 3 March 1937) was a Finnish Impressionist painter and graphic artist.

== Biography ==
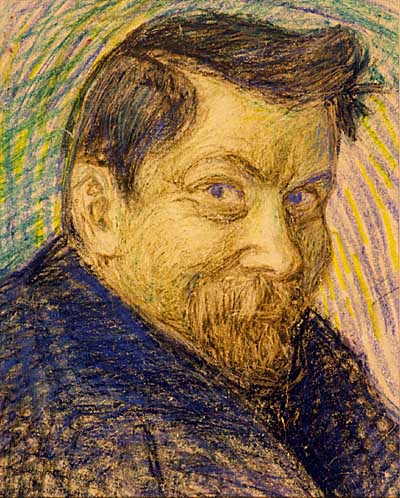
Self-portrait (date unknown)

He was born to a farming family, in Jyväskylän maalaiskunta. As a child, he suffered from frequent serious illnesses and developed a curved spine (kyphosis). His long periods of convalescence kept him from agricultural labor and gave him time to display his artistic abilities. In 1890, he was sent to study at the Lyceum in Jyväskylä. While there, he also learned to play the violin and was, for a time, torn between pursuing a career in art or music.

In 1898, he enrolled at the Academy of Fine Arts, Helsinki, where he studied with Eero Järnefelt. He began participating in shows held by the "Helsinki Society of Artists" and was one of a large group of artists chosen to represent Finland at the Exposition Universelle (1900). It was then that he first became interested in impressionism and pointillism. From 1902 to 1904, he was a student at the University of Helsinki, graduating with a degree in drawing.

He briefly returned to his hometown, making sketches and paintings around the family farm, but eventually settled in Jyväskylä, where he set up a studio and gave drawing lessons to the young Alvar Aalto, who was studying at Heiska's alma mater, the Lyceum. In 1918, he designed the first flag for the Republic of Karelia, but it was replaced in 1920 with one designed by Akseli Gallen-Kallela.

His home was also a gathering place for local musicians. In 1920, he married Maikki Aron (1889–1961), a music teacher. He made an extensive series of illustrations for the classic Finnish novel Seven Brothers by Aleksis Kivi in 1930. They were meant to be published as a book of deluxe prints, but the cost turned out to be too high. His last exhibition was in 1936 at the Strindberg Gallery in Helsinki. He died in Jyväskylä.

His daughter, Vappu, also became an artist. Before her death in 1993, she donated the family home to the city of Jyväskylä for use as a museum. In 1998, it became part of the "Museum of Central Finland" complex.

== Selected paintings ==
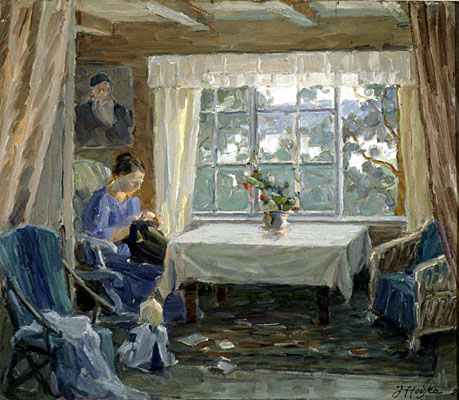
Housework

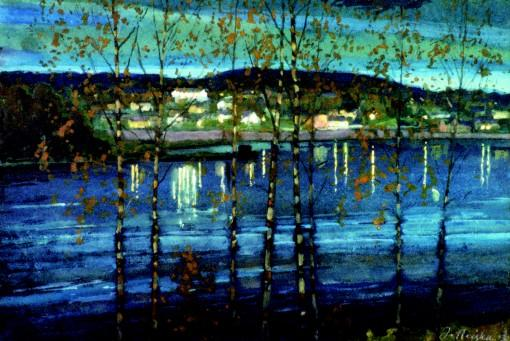
City in the Evening Light

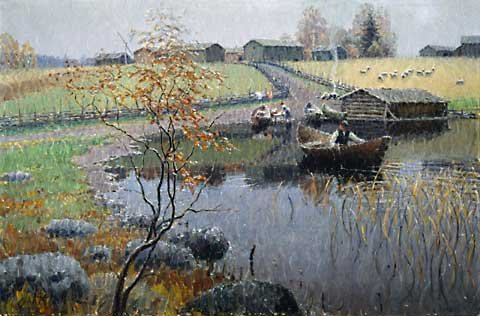
Autumn Afternoon

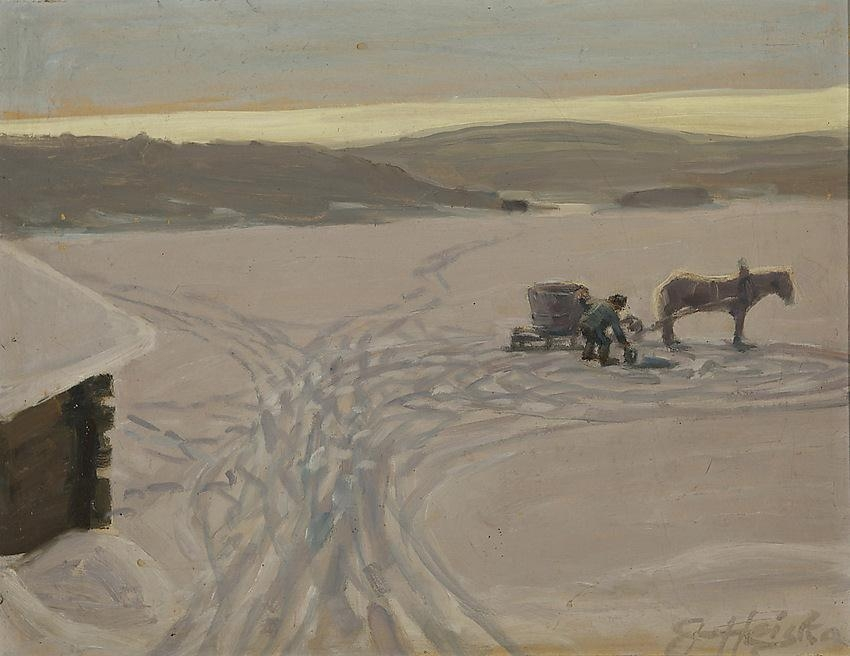
Winter Fishing
