= Proposed federal subjects of Russia =

Map of federal subjects of Russia

Numerous proposed federal subjects have been put forward since the dissolution of the Soviet Union that would partition existing federal subjects of the Russian Federation. Many new federal subjects were declared in the 1990s, most of them were not recognized, while others, like Adygea and Altai Republics, which were previously autonomous oblasts, were recognized.

While some breakaway states of the former Soviet Union have petitioned to joined Russia, the historical context is too different to be included in this article.

== Contemporary history ==
During the collapse of the Soviet Union all former ASSRs declared their sovereignty as a part of the Russian Federation, gaining a status of a republic or full independence, such as Tatarstan or Chechnya. Some autonomous oblasts, such as Altai, Adyghea, Khakassia, and Karachay-Cherkessia, were transformed into republics after declaring their sovereignty.

Due to political instability in the 1990s some Russian majority regions and other federal subjects attempted to unsuccessfully increase their autonomy. The idea of Russian majority republics was seen by the central government as a possible cause for even more conflicts.

=== Centralization ===
By the early 2000s, all republics were forced to remove the word sovereign from their constitutions by the Constitutional Court of Russia. This started a trend of even further centralization by the federal government.

The procedure for uniting regions of Russia (in a broader sense - the procedure for the formation in the Russian Federation of a new entity not related to the admission of a foreign state or part of it into the Russian Federation) is established by the Federal Constitutional Law of December 17, 2001 No. 6-FKZ “On the procedure for admission to the Russian Federation and the formation within it of a new subject of the Russian Federation".

== Reinstatement of former regions ==
=== Former autonomous okrugs ===
==== Agin-Buryatia and Ust-Orda Buryatia ====
The two Buryat autonomies were liquidated in 2008, the decision was not supported by local Buryat population, which still wants the return of Agin-Buryat Autonomous Okrug and Ust-Orda Buryat Autonomous Okrug. They are represented by the "Erhe" movement.

==== Evenkia ====
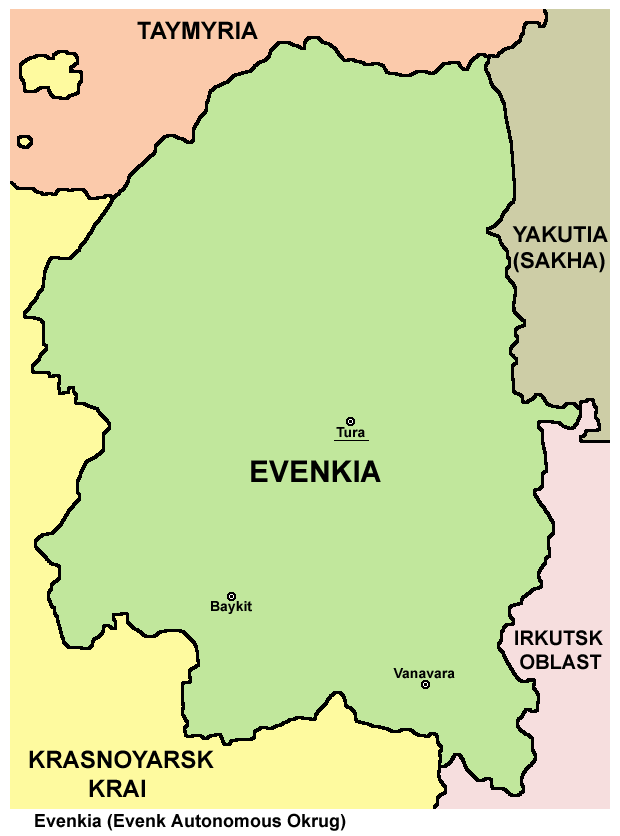
Map of Evenkia

The Evenk Autonomous Okrug was liquidated in 2007 by a referendum. However, the native Evenk population wants to restore the former subject within the borders of the current Evenk District of Krasnoyarsk Krai. The main causes are economic isolation and cultural decline. The main organization is the Association of Indigenous peoples of Evenkia "Arun".

==== Koryakia ====
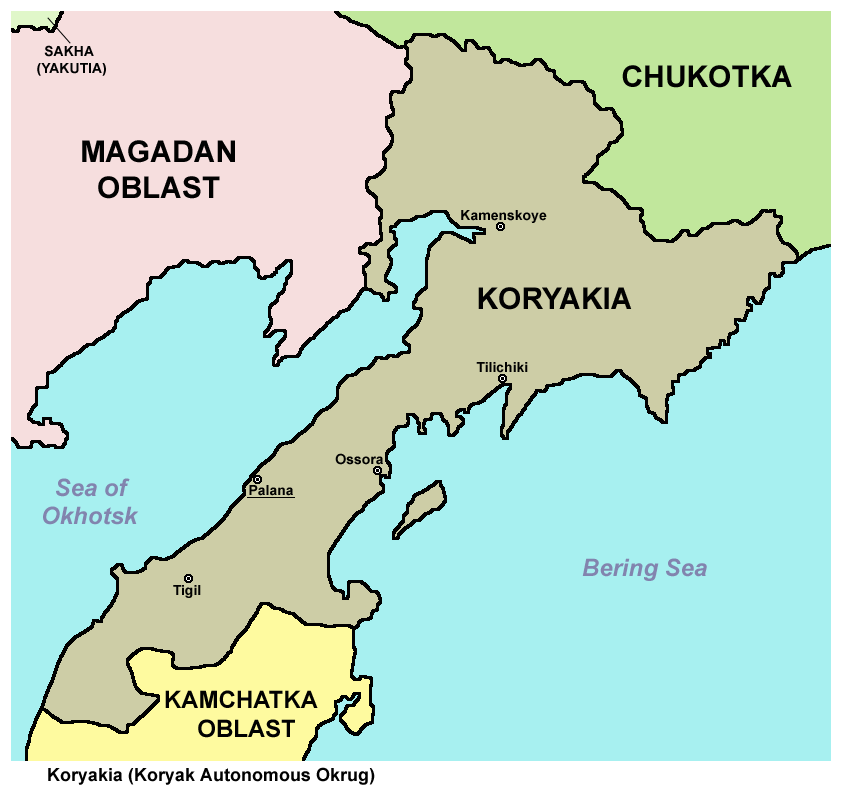
Map of Koryakia

The Koryak Autonomous Okrug was liquidated in 2007. The native Koryak population wants to restore the former subject within the borders of current Koryak Okrug of Kamchatka Krai. The idea gained big support among the local population in 2020, when the governor of Kamchatka, Vladimir Solodov, wanted to liquidate the existing autonomy of Koryakia by uniting it with another okrug. Other reasons include poverty and geographic isolation.

The biggest movements are "Koryakia" and "Palanken Ynet".

==== Permyakia ====
The Komi-Permyak Autonomous Okrug was liquidated in 2005. The native Permyak population and even some of the Russians want to restore the former subject within the borders of Komi-Permyak Okrug of Perm Krai.

Komi-Permyakia became the first autonomous okrug of Russia that voted to join another federal subject. The primary causes for separation from Perm are destruction of local culture and language and economic dependency on Perm. Local politicians and people believe that the Perm government has failed to modernize the region, as it still remains one of the poorest parts of Perm Krai.

Promotion of Permyak culture and language has been seen as separatism due to western support of those projects. And some delegates of the World Congress of Finno-Ugric Peoples have supported the idea of an independent Udmurt state. Some Russian political scientists believe that western support of Finno-Ugric cultures in Russia is a tool used by Finland, Estonia and Hungary to cause the collapse of the country.

==== Taymyr ====
The Taymyr Autonomous Okrug was liquidated in 2007. The native Nenets and Dolgan population want to restore the former subject within the borders of Taymyrsky Dolgano-Nenetsky District of Krasnoyarsk Krai. The idea is supported by the local population and there have been more than 4 attempts to organize a referendum to leave Krasnoyarsk Krai. The main causes of separatism from Krasnoyarsk are economic exploitation by the central government, geographic isolation, poverty and lack of basic infrastructure, such as roads, school and cemeteries. The economic situation is so bad that some villages resorted to use barter economy due to lack of food and money.

=== Former municipalities ===
==== Vepsia ====
The Veps National Volost was dissolved in 2004. There have been several attempts by the Karelian Congress and the Veps Culture Society to restore the autonomy.

== Division of bi-national republics ==
Russia has a number of bi-national republics, composed of two titular nations. Some of the local residents have called for creation of new mono-national regions.

=== Kabardino-Balkaria and Karachay-Cherkessia ===
There have been attempts to divide the binational republics of Kabardino-Balkaria and Karachay-Cherkessia into separate Kabardey, Balkar, Karachay, Circassian and Cossack republics or unite into Karachay-Balkaria. In 1992 the idea of disuniting Karachay-Cherkessia was rejected by a referendum.

==== Opinion polls and electoral performance ====
Reference
1992 Referendum
Dissolution of Karachay-Cherkessia into 3 entities	Preserve Karachay-Cherkess AO
21,4%	78,6%

=== Mordovia ===
Certain nationalist elements in the republic reject the idea of existence of a Mordvin ethnicity or nation, believing that it's a made-up term by the colonizers to destroy the cultures of Erzyans and Mokshans peoples. Thus they support creation of two new republics for Erzyans and Mokshans.

== New subjects ==
=== Republics ===
==== Baltic Republic ====
Flag of the Baltic Republican Party

In the late 1990s and early 2000s the Baltic Republican Party campaigned for a creation of a Baltic Republic within the border of Kaliningrad Oblast as a part of the Russian Federation. It was banned in 2003.

Most Baltic autonomists later turned to separatism.

===== Opinion polls and electoral performance =====
Electoral performance of the Baltic Republican Party
Election	Seats	+/-	Government
2000 Kaliningrad Oblast Duma	1 / 31	▲1	Opposition

==== Central Russian Republic ====
One of the proposed borders (red) for an ethnic Russian republic

The idea of a Central Russian Republic was supported by some of the local politicians in the 90s. It was to be composed of 11 regions with the capital in Orel.

The idea saw some revitalization in the late 2000s and early 2010s with some Russian Nationalists, such as the National Democratic Alliance, who created the Zalessian Rus' Movement.

==== Cossack Republics ====
Several Cossack republics were declared after the collapse of the Soviet Union.

Declared republics:

- Don Cossack Republic in 1991 and 1993
- Batalpashinskaya Cossack Republic (in Karachay-Cherkess AO) in 1991
- Zelenchukso-Urup Cossack SSR (in Karachay-Cherkess AO) in 1991
- Upper Kuban Cossack Republic in 1991

Some Cossack autonomists later turned to separatism.

==== Far Eastern Republic ====
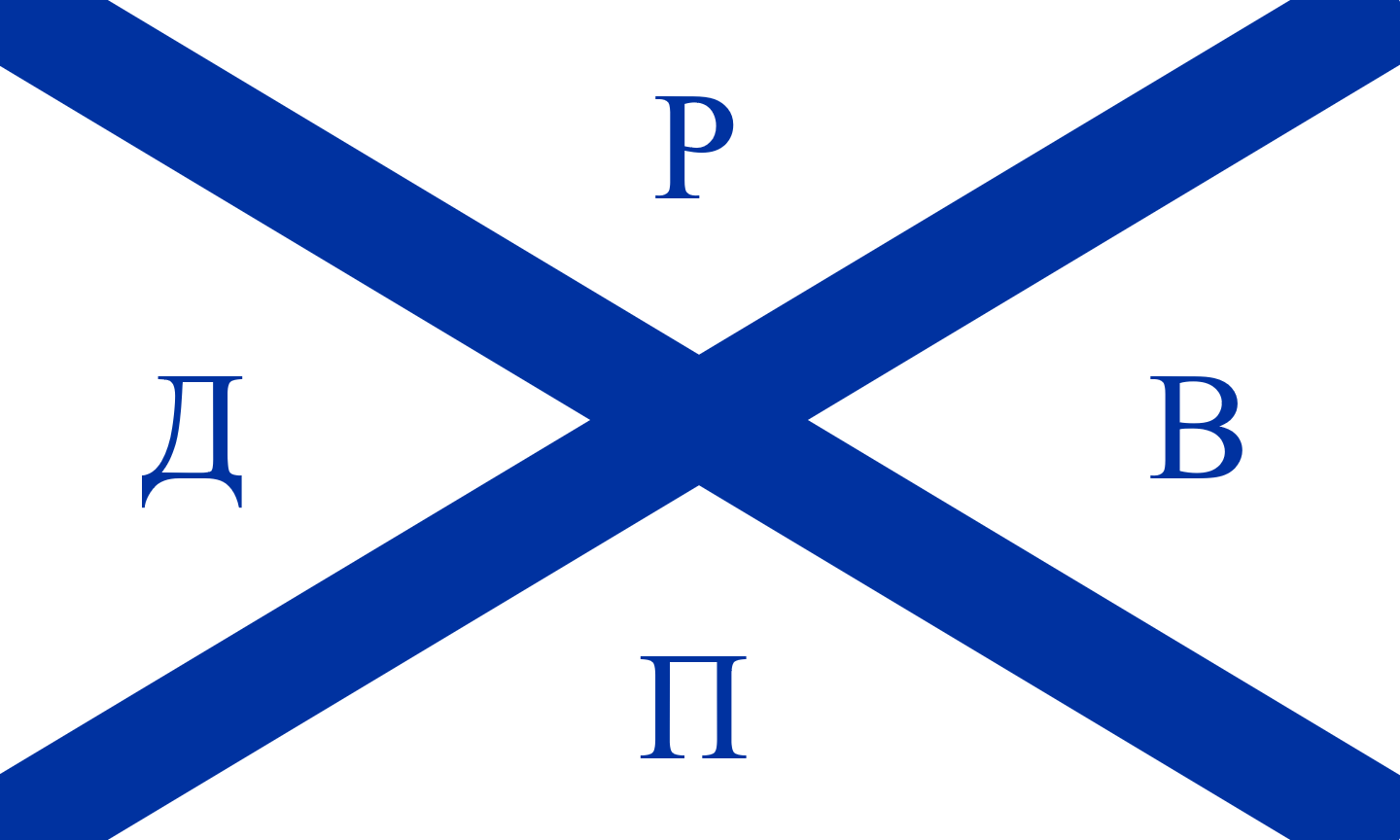
Flag of the defunct Far Eastern Republican Party

The Far Eastern Republic was a proposed federal subject within the border of the entire Far Eastern Federal District, excluding Sakha and Buryatia. The idea of an autonomous republic was supported by the former Governor of Khabarovsk Krai, Viktor Ishayev.

In 1993 the legislative Assembly of Primorsky Krai tried to proclaim a new republic as a part of the Russian Federation but the motion was 7 votes short.

Most Far Eastern Autonomists later turned to separatism.

==== Ingermandland or Neva Republic ====
Ingermanland, Ingria or Neva Republic is a proposed federal subject within the borders of Leningrad Oblast and the city of Saint Petersburg. The idea gained relative popularity in 1996 with the creation of the Movement for Autonomy of Petersburg and the Independent Petersburg movement. The idea never had any centralized leadership, some movements only demand autonomy within Russia, while other demands full independence.

==== Lezginstan ====
In the early 1990s there have been attempts to create a Lezgin autonomy in Russia and Azerbaijan.

==== Nenets Republic ====
On 13 November 1990, at a session of the Nenets District Council of People's Deputies of the 21st convocation, a proposal was made to create the Nenets Soviet Autonomous Republic within the territory of the Nenets Okrug. It was approved by the local government and the Nenets ASSR was to become the Nenets Republic. But the idea rejected due to separatism in other regions.

==== Pomor Republic ====
Proposed Pomor flag

The Pomor Republic is a proposed autonomous within the borders of Arkhangelsk Oblast, some movements also include Murmansk Oblast and Nenets Autonomous Okrug as part of a proposed state. Some local politicians, such as the former governor of Arkhangelsk Oblast Anatoly Efremov, supported the idea of reviving local culture by calling themselves Pomor.

Some more radical Pomor autonomists later turned to separatism.

==== Siberian Republic ====
In September 1993 during the Russian constitutional crisis, when Siberian governors and deputies demanded simultaneous presidential and parliamentary elections. They also announced the creation of a new federal subject of Russia — the Siberian Republic —, and claimed that if their demands were not met, they would stop the export of all resources and the payment of taxes to the federal center.

In 1997, Siberian deputies and governors created a new political party that defended interests of Siberian and Far Eastern regions and called for more autonomy, their end goal was winning presidential elections.

Most Siberian autonomists later turned to separatism.

==== South-Ural Republic ====
During the 1993 political crisis in Chelyabinsk a deputy of the local parliament Aleksander Salomatkin declared Chelyabinsk Oblast a new federal subject named South-Ural Republic. He signed the resolution “On the state and legal status of the Chelyabinsk Oblast and its transformation into the South Ural Republic.” This resolution instructs local Councils of People's Deputies to conduct a survey of the population and submit their proposals to the regional council by October 15. The regional council did not have time to analyze the proposals; in October the councils were dissolved after the dispersal of the Supreme Soviet of Russia.

==== Tver Karelia ====
Tver Karelian separatism refers to the idea of creating a Tver Karelian republic as a subject of the Russian Federation. The idea is supported by the Tver Karelia movement and Karelian Revival movement. The founder of the movements, Mikhail Dron, was prosecuted by the Tver Oblast police over false claims in 2021, but was released.

Map of the proposed Ural Republic

==== Ural Republic ====
In July 1993 Sverdlovsk Oblast Council proclaimed a new federal subject of Russia — Ural Republic. The idea was also supported by the Governor of Sverdlovsk Oblast, Eduard Rossel. In September, a treaty was signed heads of Kurgan, Orenburg, Perm, Sverdlovsk, and Chelyabinsk regions on their intention to participate in the development of joint local economic union of the Ural Republic. On November 9, 1993, President Yeltsin liquidated the Ural Republic by decree and dissolved the Sverdlovsk Oblast council. Russian government figures believed that creating a majority Russian republic will resolve in the dissolution of Russia.

Most Ural autonomists later turned to separatism.

==== Vologda Republic ====
In 1993 some local politicians attempted to start a referendum with the question “Do you think that territories and regions, including the Vologda Oblast, should have equal constitutional rights with the republics that are part of the Russian Federation?” Despite governors of the regions later claiming that the idea never existed even the 90s, Yeltsin officially dismissed the idea in 1993.

==== Yamalo-Nenets Republic ====
On 18 November 1991 the Legislative Assembly of the Yamalo-Nenets Autonomous Okrug proclaimed the Yamalo-Nenets Republic.

== Bibliography ==
- Ross, Cameron (2002). Federalism and Democratisation in Russia. Manchester University Press. ISBN 978-0-7190-5869-1.
- Шнирельман, В.А. (2015). Арийский миф в современном мире (in Russian). Moscow: НЛО. ISBN 978-5-4448-0422-3.
- Штепа, Вадим (2012). INTERREGNUM. 100 вопросов и ответов о регионализме (in Russian). Petrozavodsk: Изд. ИП Цыкарев А.В. ISBN 978-5-9903769-1-5.
- Штепа, Вадим (2019). Возможна ли Россия после империи? (in Russian). Yekaterinburg: Издательские решения. ISBN 978-5-4496-0796-6.

== See also ==
- Free Nations of Post-Russia Forum
- Separatism in Russia
- Russian irredentism
- Stateless nation
- Statelessness
