= Free Ingria =

Russian separatist organisation

- Свободная Игнрия
- Flag of the Ingrian Finns used by the organization
- Formation: 1998; 28 years ago
- Location: Russia, Leningrad Oblast, Saint-Petersburg
- Coordinators: Pavel Mezerin and Maxim Kuzakhmetov
- Affiliations: Free Nations of Post-Russia Forum
- Website: Official Telegram
- Formerly called: Ingria Movement

Free Ingria (Russian: Свободная Ингрия) is a Saint-Petersburg based informal social movement of regionalists and independentists, also called political Ingrians or “practicing local historians”.

It has existed since 1998. The movement declares as its goal either broad autonomy or complete independence of St. Petersburg and the Leningrad Oblast. It is in confrontation with the national movement of ethnic Ingrians, according to whose activists the political Ingrians “shamelessly used the historical word Ingrians for their own political purposes, and have nothing to do with the present Ingrians”.

== History ==
The first who began to propagate the idea of the revival of Ingria was the ideologist of Peterburgian vedism Viktor Bezverkhy. In the mid-1990s, the “Movement for the Autonomy of St. Petersburg” and the group “Independent Petersburg” began their activities too.

Supporters of autonomy defended the city's right to a special status within Russia and criticized regionalists for unrealistic goals. While the separatists appealed to the Republic of Northern Ingria, which existed in 1919–1920. Discussions died down in the early 2000s, when it became clear that the disputants had no real opportunity to fight for either autonomy or independence. At the same time, in the early 2000s, the society of practicing local historians “Ingria”, which arose in 1998, existed mainly in a virtual format, was reformatted into the informal social movement “Ingria”, which later changed its name to “Free Ingria”.

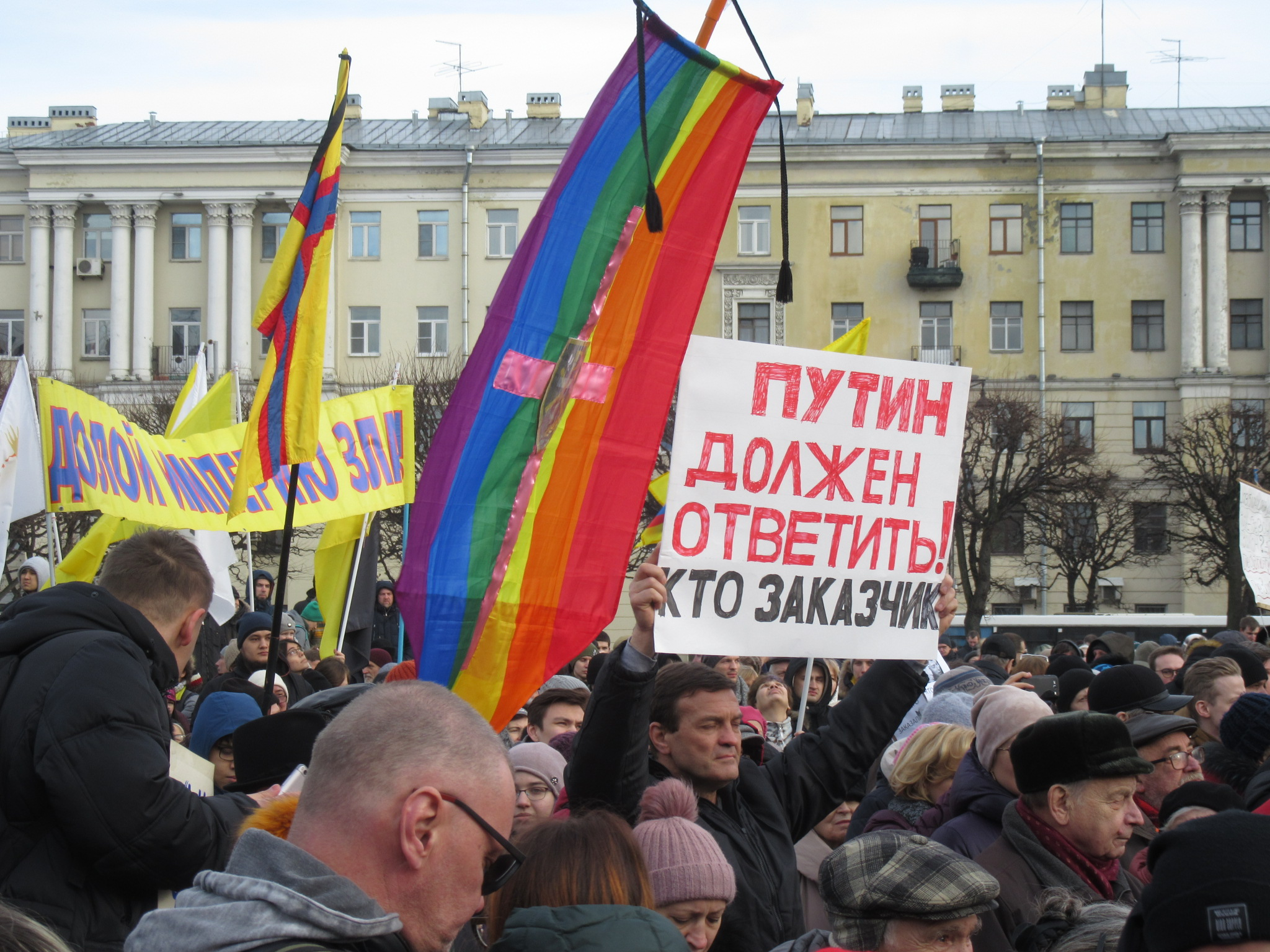
Ingrian separatists during 2019 Nemtsov memorial march with a banner saying: "Down with the Empire of Evil!"

The political activity of the movement during these years remained in line with federal protest activity. On May 1, 2016, “political Ingrians” took part in various protests with slogans like: “It's time to return this land to ourselves!”, “Ingria is our history!” and “Give me the archaeological museum on Cape Okhtinsky!” That is, all the demands were purely cultural and historical, and not political in nature. Supporters of the movement did not take part in election campaigns and did not try to get in touch with current politicians on the issue of unifying St. Petersburg and the Leningrad region into a single subject of the federation. The movement was focused on educational and ethnocultural events.

In 2016, FSB officers detained Artem Chebotarev, the administrator of the “Free Ingria” public page on the VKontakte social network. In the summer of 2017 access to the now defunct Free Ingria website was blocked in Russia. In November 2017, the police detained movement activist Mikhail Voitenkov, accusing him of illegal possession of weapons.

With the start of Russian invasion of Ukraine in 2022, the rhetoric of the movement's speakers has become more radical. Representatives of “Free Ingria” openly declared their support for Ukraine and became one of the founding members of the Free Nations of Post-Russia Forum.

In 2023, movement coordinators Pavel Mezerin and Maxim Kuzakhmetov were declared to be foreign agents.

In January 2024 one of the members of the organization, Denis Ugyumov, registered a pro-independence NGO in Lithuania under the name "New Age of Democracy Foundation".

=== "Free Ingria" platoon ===
in July 2023, it was announced the creation of a volunteer armed formation as part of the International Legion of the Armed Forces of Ukraine - the “Free Ingria” platoon. It was assumed that movement coordinators Pavel Mezerin and Denis Ugryumov would go to the front, however, only one person joined the armed group. On November 1, 2023, that person left the front line due to a conflict with representatives of the Armed Forces of Ukraine, who did not want to consider Free Ingria as a separate unit.

=== Conflict with Ingrian Finns ===
The positions and activities of members of the organization have caused discontent among many ethnic Ingrians. Some local ingrian residents have expressed their worries because in the eyes of the public they are considered shocking and eccentric ideologists of separatism for expressing their identity, although in reality they have nothing to do with the activities of Free Ingria.

In 2022, in accordance with the order of the prosecutor's office, the national flag of the Ingrians was removed from a Finnish school in St. Petersburg. In 2023, for the first time since 1989, during the celebration of Juhannus, the administration of Leningrad Oblast banned the raising of the national flag of the Ingrians. According to Ingrian activist and journalist Pjukkenen: “Over the past few years, an alarming trend has emerged - the flag began to be used by political radicals (not related to Ingrian Finns) in combination with dubious political slogans. The result was disastrous: during meetings with Inkerin Liitto activists, government officials more than once reproached the Finns for the fact that society is using an allegedly “separatist flag,” and sometimes even advised to create some new version of the flag.”

The position of those Ingrian Finns is also supported by the Evangelical Lutheran Church of Ingria.

== Goals ==
The goal of the public movement “Free Ingria” is the declared unification of St. Petersburg and the Leningrad region into a single subject of the federation, giving the new region the name Ingria. Some activists are calling for the creation of an independent Ingria as the fourth Baltic republic if Moscow refuses federalization reforms of Russia as demanded by the movement, and this statement became more common after 2022. The process during which the construction of a new regional Ingrian identity should be carried out was called “practicing local history” by supporters of the movement.

Despite the fact that the borders of the historical Ingria regions are 3 times smaller than Leningrad Oblast, the founders of this organization, for unstated reasons, extend “the borders of their interpretation of Ingria to the entire territory of the Leningrad region and consider St. Petersburg as part of it”. This predetermines “the political superficiality and marginal format of the Ingrian movement as a whole”. According to the Russian historian Daniel Kotsiubinsky, the Ingrian idea of the network movement is to replace the image of St. Petersburg as a city with a certain “country” of Finno-Ugric-Scandinavian ethnicity, culture and history.

== Bibliography ==
- Bugajski, Janusz (2022). Failed State: A Guide to Russia's Rupture. Washington, DC: The Jamestown Foundation. ISBN 978-1-7352752-2-2.
- Kotsiubinsky, Daniel (2019). Символика петербургского регионализма: попытка создания новых городских символов и причины её неудачи в 1990-2000-х гг (in Russian). Публичная политика. ISSN 2541-8351.
- Melman, A. O. (2016). История петербургских регионалистских движений в 1990-х—2000-х годах (in Russian). Yekaterinburg: СПбГУ. hdl:11701/4875.
- Krylov, P. V. (2012). "Спор за ингерманландское наследство": конструирование ингерманландской идентичности традиционная финно-угорская культура и неоингерманландский оксидентализм в Санкт-Петербурге и Ленинградской области (in Russian). Культурная память.
