= Separatism in Russia =

Political and social movements

Federal subjects Субъекты федерации (Russian)
- Crimea, Donbas, Kherson, and Zaporizhzhia, internationally recognized as parts of Ukraine, shown with diagonal stripes. Republics Krais (Frontier territories) Oblasts (regions) Federal cities Autonomous oblast (autonomous region) Autonomous okrugs (autonomous areas with a substantial ethnic minority)
- Number: 83

Separatism in Russia refers to bids for secession or autonomy for certain federal subjects or areas of the Russian Federation. Historically there have been many attempts to break away from the Russian Empire and the Soviet Union but modern separatism took shape in Russia after the Dissolution of the Soviet Union and the annexation of Crimea. Separatism in modern Russia was at its biggest in the 1990s and early 2000s. The topic became relevant again after the 2022 Russian invasion of Ukraine. The primary causes of separatism are nationalism in the republics, economic dependency, and geographic isolation. The promotion of separatism is illegal in Russia.

== Contemporary history ==
Russian philosopher and regionalist Vadim Shtepa believes that the history of separatism and regionalism in Russia can be divided into 3 parts:

- Russian Imperial (before the 1917 revolution)
- Soviet Imperial (before the dissolution of the Soviet Union)
- Modern Russian Imperial (after the 1993 constitution)

The failure of the Union of Sovereign States project led to Russia taking the place as the successor state to the Soviet Union, leaving uneven distribution of autonomy among the new federal subjects, where the national republics have much more autonomy than the Russian majority regions. It should also be noted that only the republics of Russia signed a treaty giving them autonomy, and Chechnya, despite not signing any treaties with the federal authorities, was still invaded. But by 1993 the treaty principle of federation and the sovereignty of the republics as part of the Russian Federation was not mentioned in the constitution and the old Russian Imperial era symbols, such as the double-headed eagle, were restored.

The 1993 crisis also almost caused the collapse of the Russian Federation, with some heads of republics saying that there was a real risk of a civil war.

In the 1990s, the idea of Russia becoming a eurasianist Russian nationalist state, separate from the west, became more popular among the elite, which created the idea of "Russian world".

By early 2000s all republics were forced to remove the word sovereign from their constitutions by the Constitutional Court of Russia. This started a trend of even further centralization by the federal government.

Vladimir Putin continued Boris Yeltsin's centralization policies by banning regional parties, ending direct gubernatorial elections after the Beslan siege, and by changing titles of heads of republics to head of the republic, instead of president or any other title. By 2008 the idea of "There is Putin - there is Russia, there is no Putin - no Russia", which was quoted by Vyacheslav Volodin, become popular among some politicians.

In 2013 it became illegal to promote separatism. Most of the people arrested or jailed for promoting separatism were discussing it on social networks. Most of the messages did not contain any calls for violence, but only ideas were expressed about the possible independence of one region or another.

In 2015, Moscow hosted the conference "Dialogue of nations. The right of peoples to self-determination and the construction of multipolar world". Journalists called it a "congress of separatists." The main organizer of the event was the Anti-Globalization movement of Russia, which is funded by the Russian government. The conference only included separatist movements outside Russia and most of the organizations present had little support or notoriety. This was not the first time Russia used separatism in other countries in its foreign policy.

Vadim Shtepa believes that by mid-2010s Russia became a failed federation (allegory on failed state) and a postfederal state, where the subjects don't have any actual autonomy.

Members of Russian Government and members of Russian opposition believe that the dissolution of the Russian Federation is one of the biggest threats to modern Russia.

It should also be noted that the understanding of nationality is different from many western countries, due to the fact that during the Soviet era nationality meant ethnic background, thus many separatists devolve into ethnocracy and ethnonationalism, which even happened among some post-Soviet states.

The Russian invasion of Ukraine caused a new rise in separatist activities in the country. Some analysts believe that this invasion may cause a total collapse of the Russian Federation.

== Foreign support ==
Russian government often points at foreign involvement as the primary cause of separatism in Russia, but with the exception of Ukraine, no country directly supported separatists in Russia.

=== Georgia ===
Georgia allowed the transfer of weapons, ammunition and Chechen rebels through the Pankisi gorge during the Chechen–Russian conflict.

=== Finland and Estonia ===
Russian sources have accused Finland and Estonia of stirring up separatist sentiment in the Finno-Ugric republics and regions of Russia. Head of the Security Council of Russia Nikolai Patrushev often accused Finland of supporting separatism in Karelia, going so far as claiming that Finland is creating a battalion of separatists to invade the Republic.

=== Ukraine ===
Ukraine is the only country that openly supports separatist movements in Russia. Since the start of the war in Donbas Ukraine allowed the creation of national battalions. Ukraine is also the only UN member that recognizes the independence of Chechnya, claiming that it's an occupied territory.

On November 9, 2022, deputies of Ukrainian Rada started a motion to recognize Tatarstan and Bashkortostan as occupied territories.

On August 24, 2023, Ukrainian Rada approved the draft resolution on the establishment of the Interim Special Commission of the Verkhovna Rada of Ukraine on the development of the basic principles of state interaction with the national movements of small and indigenous peoples of Russia, which would manage the relations between the Ukrainian state and the separatist movements of Russia.

==== Separatist volunteer battalions ====
| Name | Region | Date of formation |
|---|---|---|
| Bashkir Company | Bashkortostan | 2022 |
| Dzhokhar Dudayev Battalion | Chechnya | 2014 |
| Separate Special Purpose Battalion | Chechnya | 2022 |
| Imam Shamil Dagestan Battalion | Dagestan | 2022 |
| Karelian National Battalion | Karelia | 2023 |
| Khamzat Gelayev Battalion | Chechnya | 2022 |
| Siberian Battalion | Siberia | 2023 |
| Sheikh Mansur Battalion | Chechnya | 2022 |
| Special Operations Group | Chechnya | 2023 |
| 34th Assault Battalion "Mad Pack" | Chechnya | 2014 |
| Krym Battalion | Crimea (Note: Internationally recognized as part of Ukraine) | 2014 |
| Muslim Corps "Caucasus" | Caucasus | 2022 |

=== NGOs ===
Various NGOs have acted as hosts to various separatist groups, such as the Free Nations of Post-Russia Forum and the Free Nations League.

== Primary causes ==
=== Ethnic and religious causes ===
- Pan-Turkism — Originated in early twentieth century. Mainly supported from Turkey. A consolidating anti-Russian factor for Turkic peoples, also Buryats, Kalmyks and the peoples of the Tungus-Manchu group.
- Siberian regionalism / Siberian Republic — Belief that Russians in Siberia and the Far East warrant autonomy due to their regional distinctiveness. Has its roots in the second half of the 19th century. Geographically and economically isolated regions of the Russian North and Far East often demand more autonomy, isolation causes the local population to preserve or develop its own culture.
- Pan-Finnicism / Finno-Ugric nationalism — Considers Finnish-Ugric peoples to be indigenous and entitled to lands throughout the northern half of the European part of Russia, and in Western Siberia. In those subjects of the Russian Federation where there are no local Finno-Ugric ethnic groups, there are enthusiasts who claim to be Finno-Ugric after having an "awakening of national consciousness".
- Quasi-ethnic confederalism and Russian separatism — Exploits dissatisfaction with the policies of the federal center in many areas, tries to create an idea that Russians in the respective regions that make up a separate nation: "Volgars", "Uralians", "Pomors", etc.

These four causes are predominantly secular and do not deny constitutional foundations of the Russian Federation, with the exception of express separatist intentions.

- New religious sects — Neo-pagans can pose a threat only as an additional a factor of aggravation of the situation in the event of a general destabilization.
- Wahhabism — Common in North Caucasus, Tatarstan and Bashkortostan. One of the biggest threats to security in those regions.

=== Other causes ===
- Conflict between regional elites and the central government — became especially common after 2014.
- Organized crime — often uses anti-government rhetoric to gain support among the local population, especially common in the Urals, Siberia and the Far East.

== Secessionist movements ==
Most of the movements in this list existed before the collapse of the Soviet Union. These movements have some levels of support among the local population, diaspora, local politicians, and regional elites. Most of the movements are small in size and have limited support.

=== Northwestern Federal District ===
The main groups pushing for autonomy and separatism within the Northwestern Federal District are Finno-Ugric peoples, but other civic nationalist movements are also prominent in the region. The movements are mainly located in the Kaliningrad, Leningrad and Arkhangelsk Oblasts, as well as in the Karelian and Komi Republics. The movements in the Northwest are influenced by their close proximity to the European Union and NATO.

==== Baltic Republic ====
The Baltic Republic (or Land of Amber/Yantarny Krai/Königsberg) is a proposed state within the borders of Kaliningrad Oblast. The idea was mainly supported by the Baltic Republican Party which was dissolved in 2005 and was one of the few openly separatist parties, which were allowed to run in the elections. Members of the Baltic Republican Party were present in Kaliningrad Oblast Duma until the party lost its status as a political party.

Independence is supported by Kaliningrad Public Movement, which is represented on the Free Nations of Post-Russia Forum, and the Respublika movement. Baltic separatists support decommunization and the use of German city names.

In 2022, the Governor of Kaliningrad Oblast said that there was an attempt to create a "German autonomy" in Kaliningrad by western agents to destabilize the region. It was one of the first mentions of separatism in Russia by governors after the invasion of Ukraine.

===== Opinion polls and electoral performance =====
Electoral performance of the Baltic Republican Party
| Election | Seats | +/- | Government |
| 2000 Kaliningrad Oblast Duma | 1 / 31 | ▲1 | Opposition |

==== Ingria ====
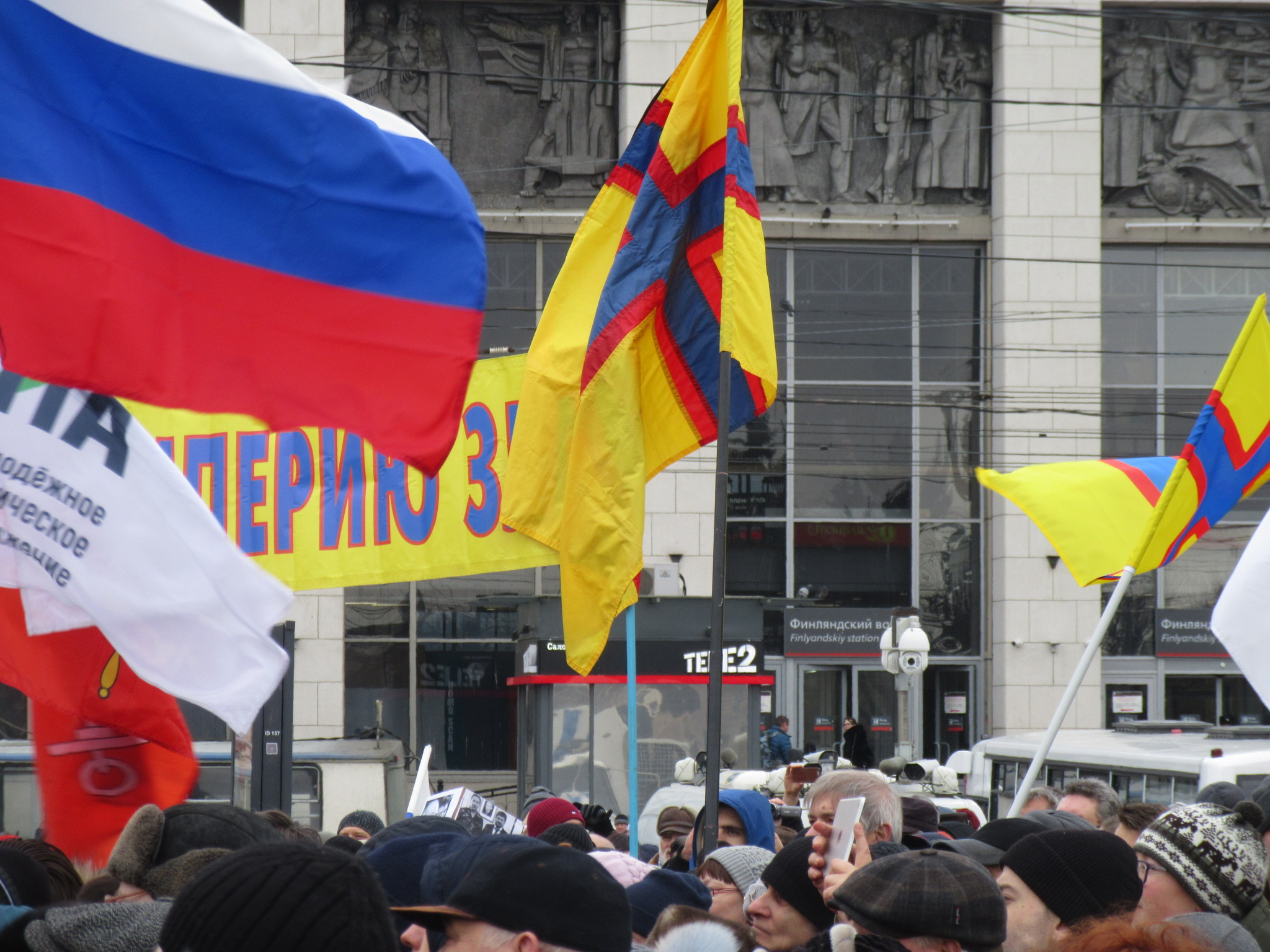
Ingrian separatists during 2019 Nemtsov memorial meeting

Ingermanland or Ingria is a proposed state within the borders of Leningrad Oblast and the city of Saint Petersburg. Ingrian separatism began with Viktor Bezverkhy in the 1970s and 1980s, but the concept only gained relative popularity in 1996 with the creation of the Movement for Autonomy of Petersburg and the Independent Petersburg movement. Currently, the idea is supported by the "Free Ingria" movement and "Ingria Without Borders" movement, which are represented in the Free Nations of Post-Russia Forum. The main supporters of Ingermanland are Russians unhappy with the nation's centralization, although in recent times "various groups and movements of Ingria supporters" do not support complete Ingrian independence, while some movements still advocate for full independence. Ethnic Ingrian Finns have unsuccessfully requested the movement to stop using their ethnic flag.

In 2022, popular Russian rapper Oxxxymiron mentioned Ingria in his anti-war song Oyda in which he says "Ingria will be free", which gave the movements more recognition in the region.

In 2023, activists of "Free Ingria" started to organize an armed group as a part of the Civic Council.

==== Karelia ====
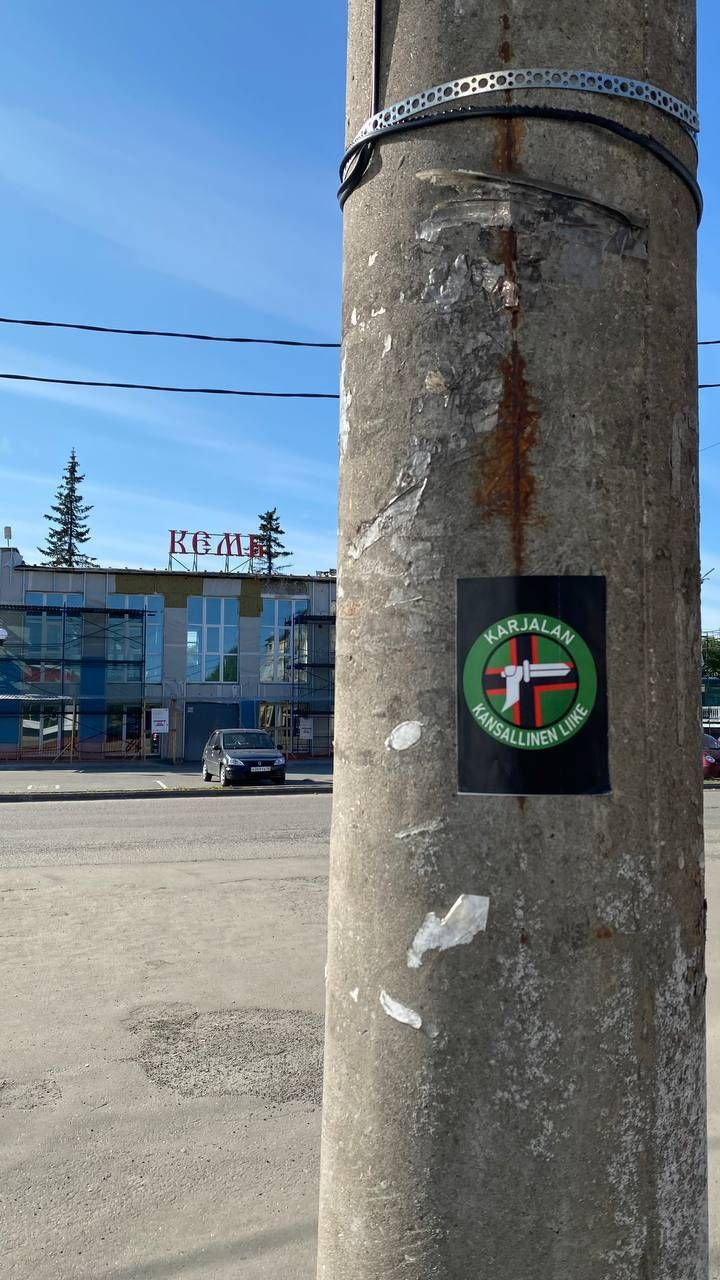
Karelian National Movement sticker in Kem

Karelian separatism dates back to the early 20th-century, with the creation of the Union of White Sea Karelians and Uhtua Republic. The idea saw a revival in the 1990s and early 2000s due to the unofficial status of the Karelian language in Karelia and the Russian economic collapse of 1991–92. The first attempt to break away was in 1992, when Sergei Popov, a member of the Supreme Council of the Republic, proposed to include in the agenda the question of the possibility of secession of the Republic of Karelia from the Russian Federation. He was supported by 43 deputies out of 109.

Promotion of Karelian, Finnish and Veps cultures and languages has been seen as separatism due to western support of those projects. And some delegates of the World Congress of Finno-Ugric Peoples have supported the idea of an independent Karelian state. Some Russian political scientists state that western support of Finno-Ugric cultures in Russia is a tool used by Finland, Estonia and Hungary to cause the collapse of the country.

The main Karelian separatist organization in the 2010s was the Republican Movement of Karelia, which was legally dissolved in 2019. Despite this, its founder, Vadim Shtepa, also affirms that before and during the dissolution of the Soviet Union there was a popular front in Karelia similar to the Popular Fronts of Estonia, Latvia and Lithuania, but this claim is unverified. In 2015, a trial began against Vladimir Zavarkin, a deputy of the city council of Suojärvi, who was accused of supporting separatism.

The idea of Karelian separatism is currently supported by the Republican Movement of Karelia and the Karelian National Movement. The Karelian National Movement is represented on the Free Nations of Post-Russia Forum. The main difference between the movements lies in their treatment towards ethnic Russians and other non-Finno-Ugric peoples. The Republican Movement of Karelia supports the idea of a multi-ethnic state based on civic nationalism, while the Karelian National Movement opposes Russians and other non-Finno-Ugric peoples involving themselves in Karelian separatist movements and supports creation of an ethnostate.

In 2023, the Karelian National Movement organized the Karelian National Battalion.

In 2023, there have been arrests of people who planned to join or advocated for others to join the Karelian National Battalion, and arrests over acts of domestic terrorism connected to separatism.

==== Komi ====
Komi separatism primarily focuses on the preservation of Komi culture, language, and local ecology. Many cultural and language movements, such as Doryam asymös, have been labeled separatist by authorities and some of the members arrested.

Komi government was accused of separatism for their close relations with Finland, Estonia and Hungary.

Promotion of Komi culture and language has been seen as separatism due to western support of those projects. And some delegates of the World Congress of Finno-Ugric Peoples have supported the idea of an independent Komi state. Some Russian political scientists believe western support of Finno-Ugric cultures in Russia is a tool used by Finland, Estonia and Hungary to cause the collapse of the country.

Komi separatists are represented on the Free Nations of Post-Russia Forum.

==== Pomorie ====
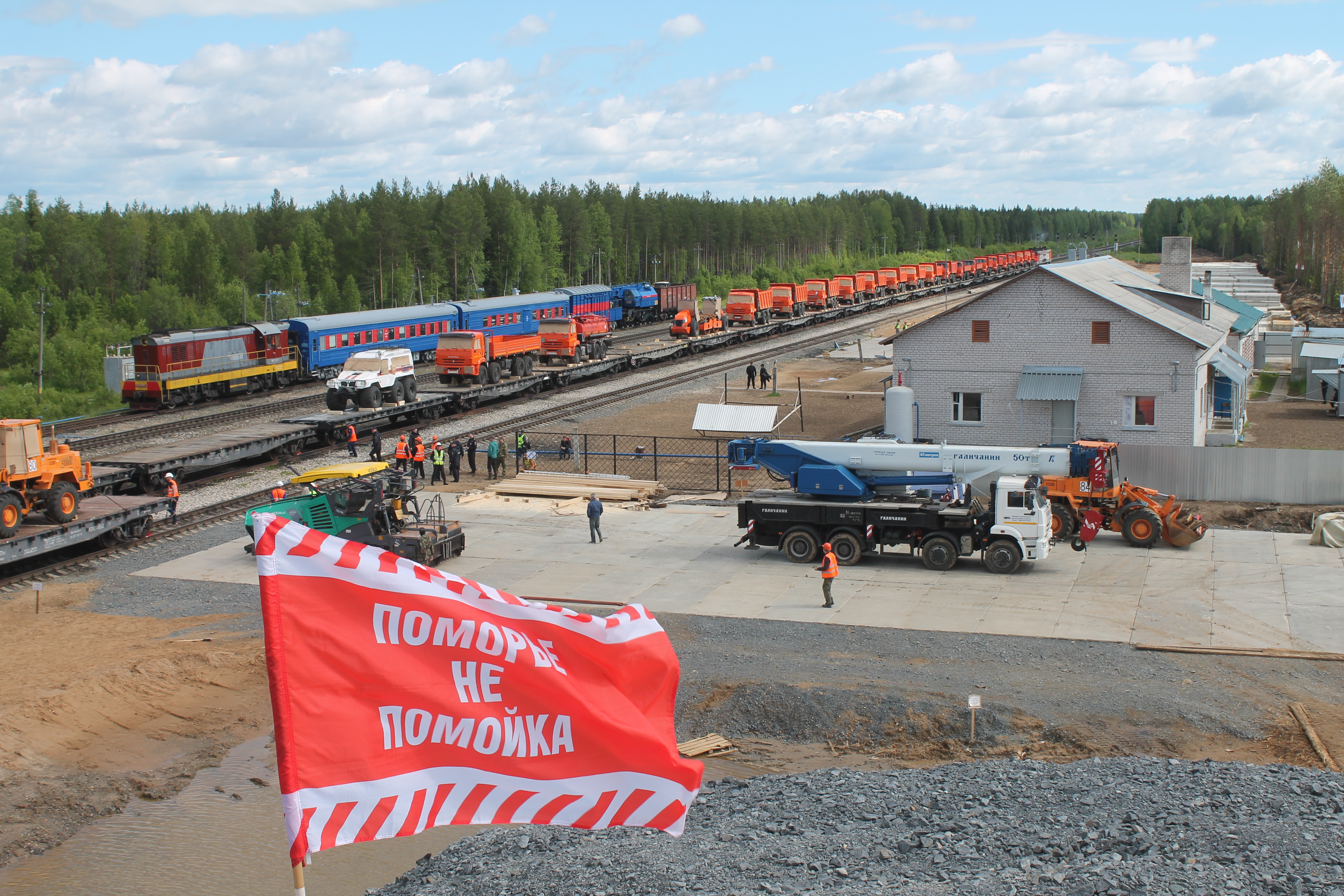
Flag saying: "Pomorie is not a garbage dump" during 2018–2020 Shies protests

Pomorie (sometimes referred to as Biarmia) is a proposed state within the borders of Arkhangelsk Oblast; some movements also include Murmansk Oblast and Nenets Autonomous Okrug as part of a proposed state. The Pomor Institute of Native Peoples supported the idea of a Pomor Republic.

During the Shies protests of 2018–2020, slogans "Pomorie is not a garbage dump" and "No to Moscow garbage" were popular not only in separatist groups but also in general population. Nevertheless, an Arkhangelsk journalist Dmitry Sekushin said that the official flag of Arkhangelsk Oblast isn't used by protestors because of potential accusations of separatism. Many Pomor cultural movements have been labeled as separatist for "disuniting Russian culture".

In 2013, a Pomor human rights activist, Ivan Moseev, head of the main Pomor regionalist and cultural organization "Pomor Revival", who worked in NArFU university in Arkhangelsk was accused of inciting hatred against ethnic Russians for his comment on the Internet. He was put on the Russian list of terrorists and extremists. In 2022, the ECHR recognized the case as an infringement of the freedom of speech and awarded him a payment of 8,800 euros.

Some Pomor cultural and political organizations demanded a creation of a Pomor Republic within Russia that would include Arkhangelsk Oblast, Komi Republic, Murmansk Oblast, and Nenets AO.

Pomor organization "Pomoṙska Slobóda" were represented by the Karelian National Movement on the Free Nations of Post-Russia Forum.

=== Southern Federal District ===
Separatism in the Southern Federal District is primarily ethnic but some civic nationalist movements are also active. The movements are mainly located in Astrakhan Oblast, Crimea, Krasnodar Krai, Rostov Oblast, and Kalmykia.

==== Cossackia ====
Map of the Almighty Don Host

Cossack separatism originated during the Russian Civil War with the proclamation of Almighty Don Host existing from 1918 to 1920. Among a number of Cossack emigrants, the ideas of Cossack nationalism were widespread. Since the collapse of the USSR, several attempts have been made to revive the Don Republic. The Don Cossack Republic was proclaimed in the fall of 1991 and became part of the Union of Cossack Republics of Southern Russia, which planned to become one of the union republics. In March 1993, the Great Cossack circle of the Don approved an act on the transformation of the Rostov region into a state-territorial entity.

Don Cossack separatists seeking the creation of the state of Cossackia are represented on the Free Nations of Post-Russia Forum.

==== Kalmykia ====
Kalmyk separatism seeks the creation of an independent Kalmyk state and unification with Astrakhan Oblast. The biggest movement is the Oirat-Kalmyk People's Congress, which is represented on the Free Nations of Post-Russia Forum. Promotion of Kalmyk culture has been viewed as separatism by central authorities.

In 2022, Shajin Lama (the spiritual leader of Kalmyk Buddhists) of Kalmykia denounced the Russian invasion of Ukraine.

==== Kuban ====
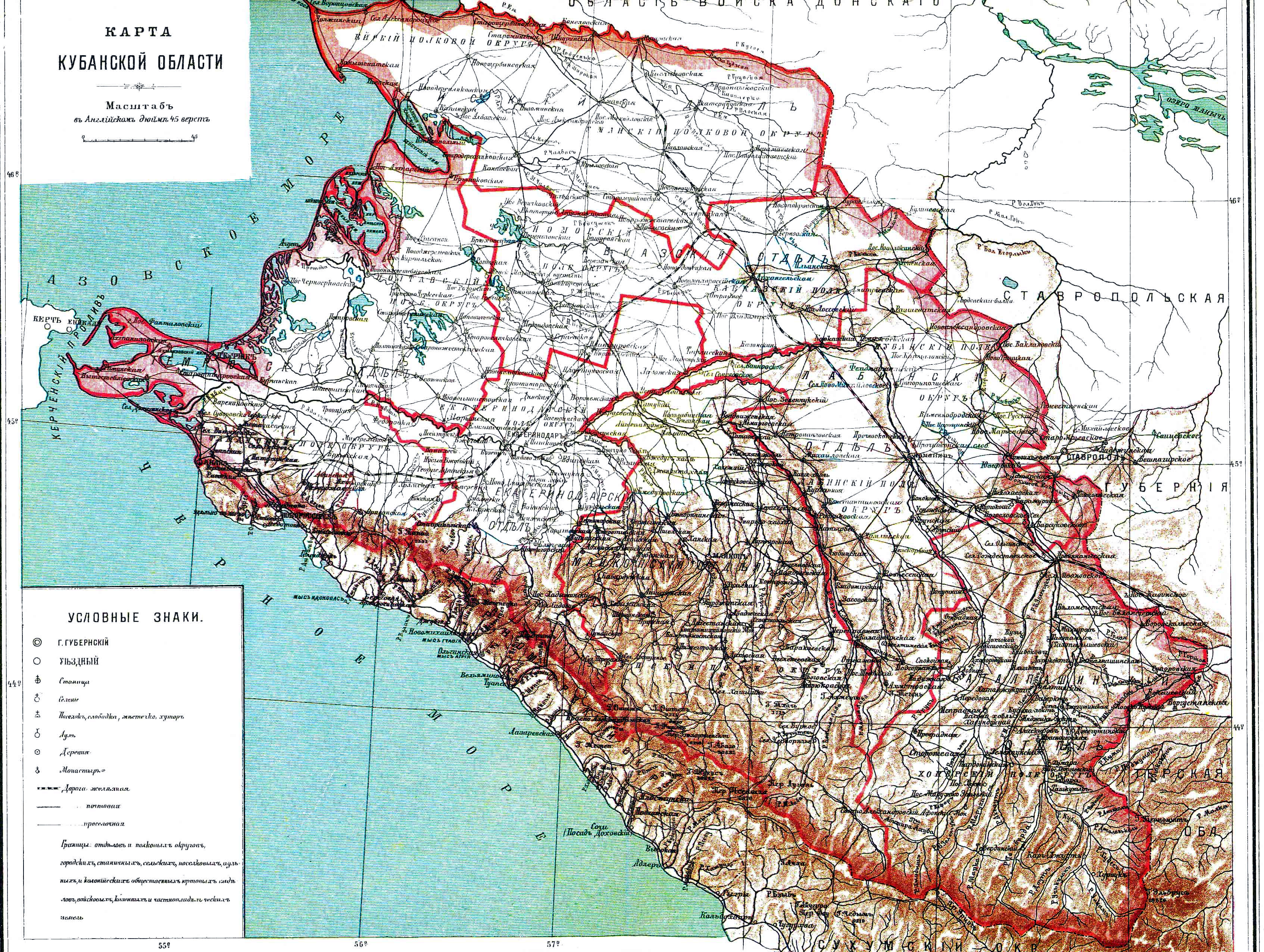
Map of the Kuban Republic

Kuban separatism or Kuban Cossack separatism originates during the Russian Civil War with the proclamation of Kuban People's Republic. The idea saw revival in the 90s and early 2000s due to revitalization of the Cossack culture. The majority of Kuban separatists identify as Cossack, and, due to subsidization of many Cossack cultural movements, more and more people in Kuban identify as Cossack. In 2017, Kuban Liberation Movement proclaimed independence of Kuban People's Republic, but the stunt received no recognition.

Kuban separatists are represented on the Free Nations of Post-Russia Forum.

=== North Caucasian Federal District ===
Separatism in North Caucasian Federal District is primarily ethnic. Almost all of the republics have an active separatist movement. The primary causes of separatism in this region are ethnic conflicts, poverty, low levels of social development, and radical Islam.

Separatism remains one of the main problems in the region. In the opinion of Chechen publicist Ruslan Martagov, it is impossible to solve this problem within the framework of the Kremlin's current policy in the North Caucasus, since active separatist sentiments “are generated by the Kremlin's inept, provocative policy.”

==== Chechnya ====
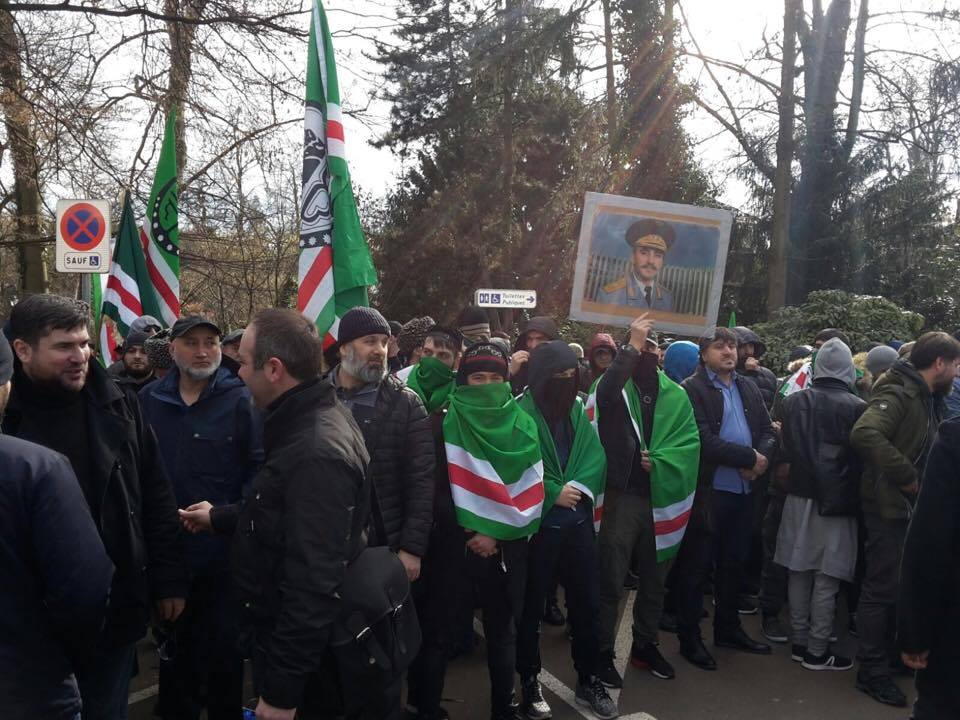
Protest in Strasbourg in memory of the deportation of Chechens and Ingush

Chechen separatism dates all the way back to the 1800s and the Caucasus war. Modern Chechen separatism began with the declaration of independence of the Chechen Republic of Ichkeria. After two wars, Chechnya was reincorporated into the Russian Federation. After the war an insurgency movement to restore Chechen independence was started.

The government of Ichkeria is currently in exile. Ichkeria was recognized as "temporarily occupied" by Ukrainian parliament in 2022. Currently there are Chechen volunteers fighting for the Ukrainian army with the goal to restore independence. Other Chechen separatist movements, such as Adat People's Movement, operate independently from Ichkerian government. Chechen separatists are represented on the Free Nations of Post-Russia Forum.

==== Circassia ====
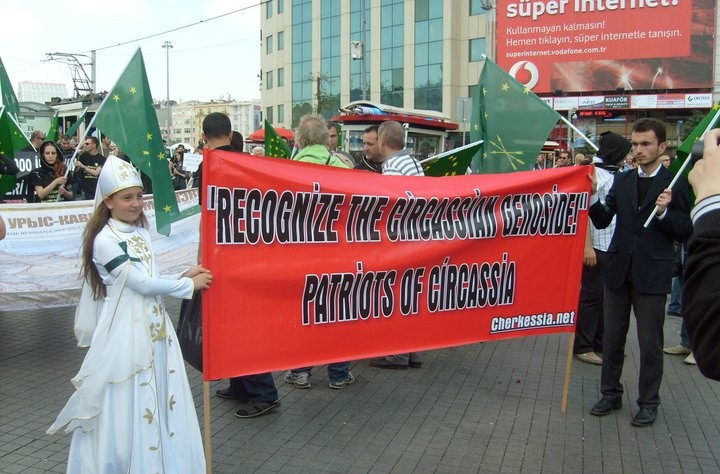
Circassian diaspora protest

Circassia is a proposed state that covers the land which was historically inhabited by Circassian people, such as Adygeya (Part of Southern Federal District), north Kabardino-Balkaria, north Karachay–Cherkessia, south-east Krasnodar Krai, and south Stavropol Krai. The independence of Circassia has some support in the republics, but most of the support comes from the Circassian diaspora and International Circassian Association. After the independence of Abkhazia and South Ossetia the separatism in Circassian regions started to grow.

Circassian nationalism in Russia is caused by the fact that the Russian government tries to ignore the Circassian issue. The Russian government has not recognized the Circassian genocide and refuses to recognize Circassians as the native peoples of the Black Sea coast, the issue became especially discussed during the 2014 Olympic Games, which were held in a former Circassian city of Sochi, Krasnodar Krai. Circassians in Russia and abroad protested the games for ignoring the historical background of the city, but they were ignored by the Russian government. Circassians are also not recognized as one of the native peoples of Krasnodar Krai. There have also been attempts to integrate the Republic of Adyghea into Krasnodar Krai. Since 2014 Circassian separatism and nationalism has been on decline but it is still a threat to the stability of Southern Russia.

Circassian separatists are represented on the Free Nations of Post-Russia Forum.

==== Dagestan ====
Modern Dagestan separatism began in the 80s and 90s when radical Islam started to gain popularity among the citizens of the regions. The movement can refer to the idea of an independent united Dagestan or disunited independent states, such as Aghulistan, Avaria, Lezgistan, Darginstan, Lakistan, Rutulstan and Tabarasanstan. Proponents of a united Dagestan want to create a multiethnic state. Some of the local separatist movements have been represented in the UNPO. Dagestani separatism began to gain influence in 2006 after it became a presidential republic, instead of having 14 elected representatives (1 for each of the main ethnic groups). In 2014 the title of President of the Republic of Dagestan was changed to Head of the Republic of Dagestan.

==== Ingushetia ====
Flag used by the Ingush Liberation Army

Ingush separatism has been growing after the collapse of the Soviet Union due to the fact that the borders between Chechnya, North Ossetia-Alania, and Ingushetia have not been decided upon. Some separatists suggested that Ingushetia should unite with Georgia.

In 2023, the Ingush Independence Committee, an organization made up of Ingush migrants in Turkey, was established with the main goal of gaining Ingushetia's independence from Russia.

Committee of Ingush Independence is represented on the Free Nations of Post-Russia Forum.

In 2023, a counter-terrorist operation began in the Republic after attacks on policemen and military personnel.

==== North Ossetia ====
Alanian (or Ossetian) separatism refers to the movement to create an independent united Ossetian nation by uniting with South Ossetia.

==== United Caucasia ====
Since the creation of the Mountainous Republic of the Northern Caucasus there have been other attempts at creating a unified Caucasian independent state.

===== Confederation projects =====
Flag of the Confederation of Mountain Peoples of the Caucasus

The Confederation of Mountain Peoples of the Caucasus (or Confederation of Peoples of the Caucasus) is a proposed state within the borders of Russia's Caucasian republics, South Ossetia and Abkhazia. The symbols used by the separatists are based on symbols of the Mountainous Republic of the Northern Caucasus. The main movement of the separatists is the Confederation of Peoples of the Caucasus, a paramilitary organization that fought in Chechnya, Abkhazia, and South Ossetia. The organization became inactive after its leader, Yusup Soslambekov, was assassinated in 2002.

One of the biggest proponents of a new confederation, which only includes the Russian republics, is the Chechen government in exile, but the idea was rejected by other movements, such as the Committee of Ingush Independence.

=== Volga Federal District ===
Separatism in Volga Federal District is primarily ethnic. All the republics have an active separatist movement. Just like in the Caucasus, the history of Volga separatism dates all the way back to the Tsarist era and many of the national uprisings, such as the Bashkir uprising.

==== Bashkortostan ====
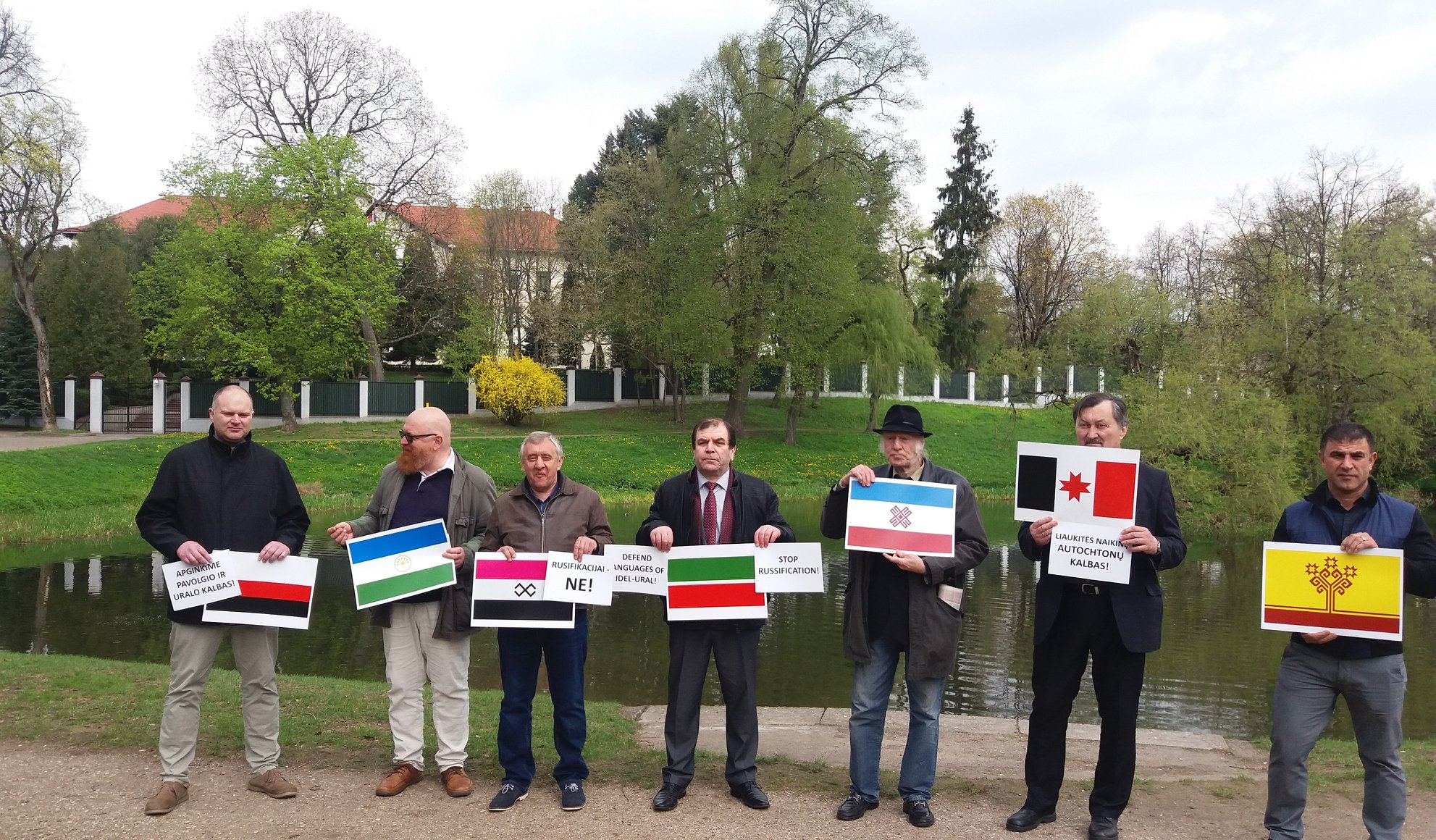
Protest against russification of Volga in Vilnius

Modern Bashkir separatism began in the 90s and was influenced by Tatarstan. Just like most other movements, Bashkir separatism continued to grow in the early 2000s and even got some support from the local government. In 2020, separatists joined the protests against the occupation of the Kushtau mountain. Some Bashkir separatists, such as the Bashkort movement and Bashkir National-Political Center of Lithuania, support a creation of a multiethnic state for both Bashkirs and Russians. Bashkir separatists are represented on the Free Nations of Post-Russia Forum.

After the Russian Invasion of Ukraine, there have been reports of armed resistance in Bashkortostan and a company of the Ukrainian armed forces was created with the goal of establishing an independent Bashkir state.

==== Chuvashia ====
Chuvash separatism focuses on the preservation of Chuvash language of culture and the creation of an independent Chuvash Republic or Volga Bulgaria. The main organizations are the Union of Chuvash local historians, Suvar movement, and Chuvash National Congress.

Chuvash paganists were criticized by the Russian Orthodox Church for being separatists.

Chuvash separatists are represented on the Free Nations of Post-Russia Forum.

==== Erzyan Mastor ====
Erzyan Mastor (Land of Erzya) is a proposed state by the Erzya National Congress. The movement claimed the territories of Republic of Mordovia, Penza, Ulyanovsk, Nizhny Novgorod, Ryazan, and Samara Oblasts. The movement wants to create a federative state with a Moksha autonomy.

Erzyan separatists reject the idea of existence of a Mordvin ethnicity or nation, believing that it's a made-up term by the colonizers to destroy the cultures of Erzyans and Mokshans.

Promotion of Erzyan and Mokshan cultures and languages has been seen as separatism due to western support of those projects. And some delegates of the World Congress of Finno-Ugric Peoples have supported the idea of an independent Mordvin state. Some Russian political scientists believe that western support of Finno-Ugric cultures in Russia is a tool used by Finland, Estonia and Hungary to cause the collapse of the country.

The movement is represented on the Free Nations of Post-Russia Forum.

==== Idel-Ural ====
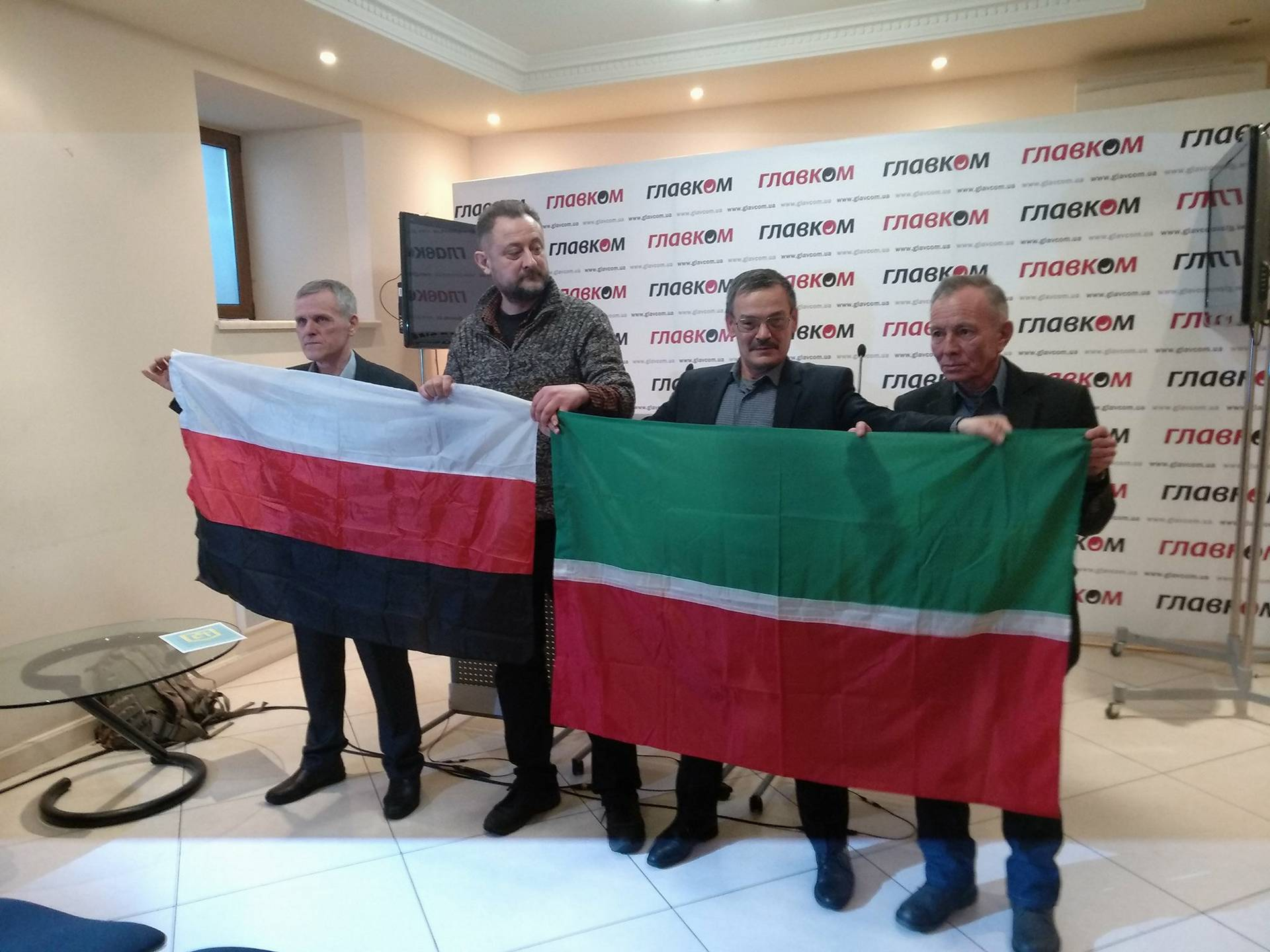
Flags of Erzyan Mastor and Tatarstan being held by the founders of Free Idel-Ural Movement

The idea of a unified Idel-Ural began during the Russian Civil War with the creation of the Idel-Ural State. The name was later used by the Idel-Ural Legion of Nazi Germany during the invasion of the Soviet Union.

The main movement of modern Idel-Ural separatists is the Free Idel-Ural movement, which was registered in 2018 in Kyiv. The movement wants to create a multi-ethnic federal state.

The Free Idel-Ural movement is represented on the Free Nations of Post-Russia Forum.

==== Mari-El ====
Modern Mari separatism began with the collapse of the USSR. The biggest political organization of Mari nationalists is Mari Ushem, which is over 100 years old. While not separatist in nature, some of its members have expressed separatist ideas. Other movements include Kugeze Mlande, a far-right separatist organization, Mari Mer Kagash, and the Association of Finno-Ugric Peoples. Mari paganists were also criticized by the Russian Orthodox Church for being separatists.

Promotion of Mari has been seen as separatism due to western support of those projects. And some delegates of the World Congress of Finno-Ugric Peoples have supported the idea of an independent Mari state. Some Russian political scientists believe that western support of Finno-Ugric cultures in Russia is a tool used by Finland, Estonia and Hungary to cause the collapse of the country.

Mari separatists are represented on the Free Nations of Post-Russia Forum.

==== Tatarstan ====
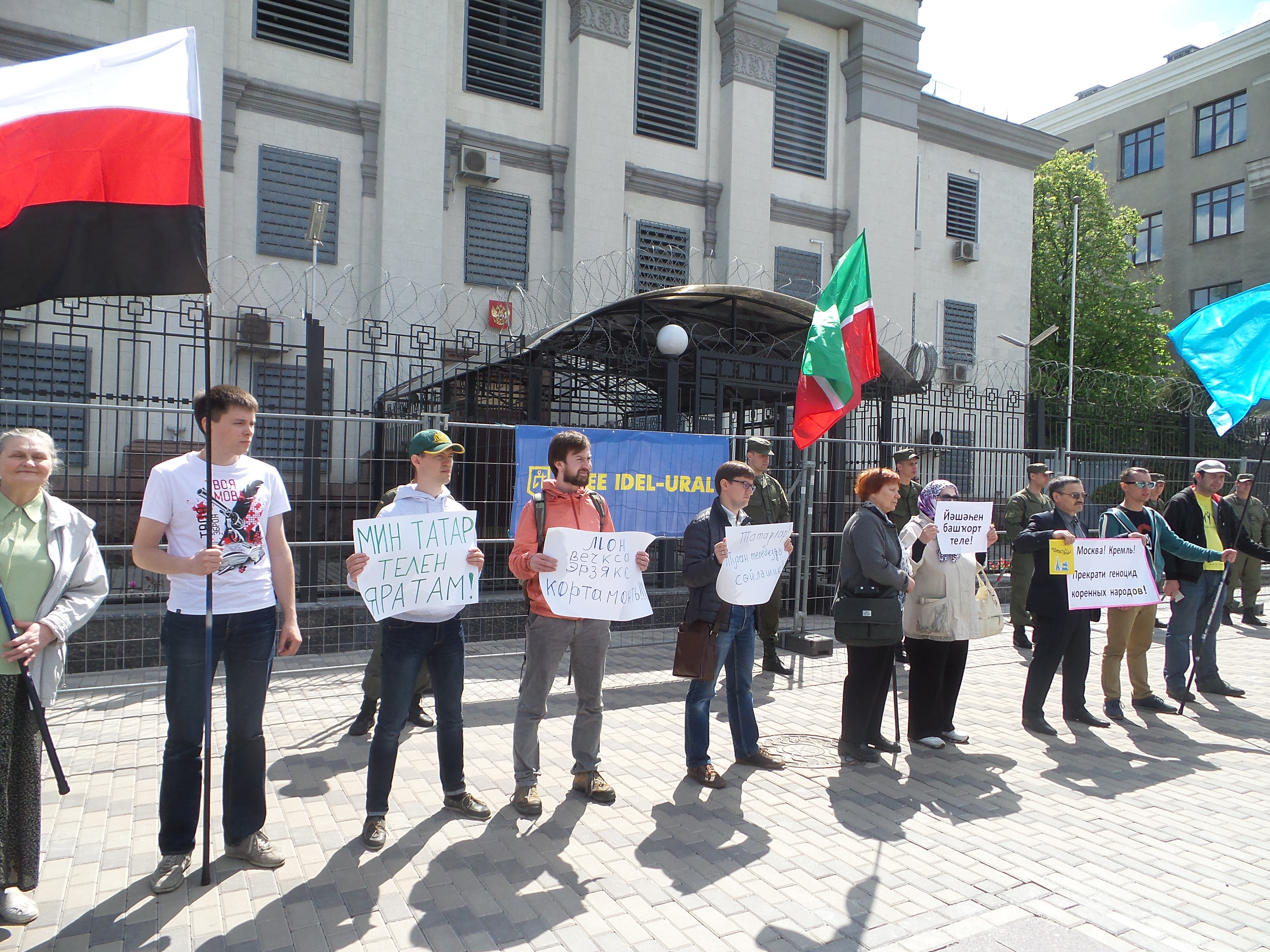
Free Idel Ural activists in front of the Russian embassy in Kyiv, 2018

Modern Tatar separatism began in 1990, when Tatar ASSR declared its sovereignty from the USSR and the RSFSR. On October 18, 1991, the Republic of Tatarstan declared its full independence. In 1992 an independence referendum was held, in which more than 50% voted for full independence from Russia. In 1994, Tatarstan unified with Russia as an associated state, this agreement ended in 2017.

In 2008, Tatarstan government in exile and the Milli Mejlis of the Tatar People declared independence of Tatarstan after the Russo-Georgian war. However, this declaration was ignored by the United Nations.

By 2021, the government of Tatarstan refused to change the title of its president to the head of the republic as per a national order, which was interpreted by some political commentators as separatism. The republic finally yielded to Moscow's pressure in 2023.

Many political scientists and commentators believe that Tatarstan is the leading separatist force in modern Russia and an example for other movements. The main Tatar separatist movements are the All-Tatar Public Center, Tatarstan government in exile, the Milli Mejlis of the Tatar People, and the Ittifaq Party, which used to legally operate in the Russian Federation until their ban in late 2010s. They are represented on the Free Nations of Post-Russia Forum.

===== Opinion polls and electoral performance =====
1992 Tatarstan referendum
Do you agree that the Republic of Tatarstan is a sovereign state, a subject of international law, building its relations with the Russian Federation and other republics, states on the basis of equal treaties?
| Yes | No | Invalid |
| 61.39% (1,309,056 votes) | 37.25% (794,444 votes) | 1.35% (28,851) |

==== Udmurtia ====
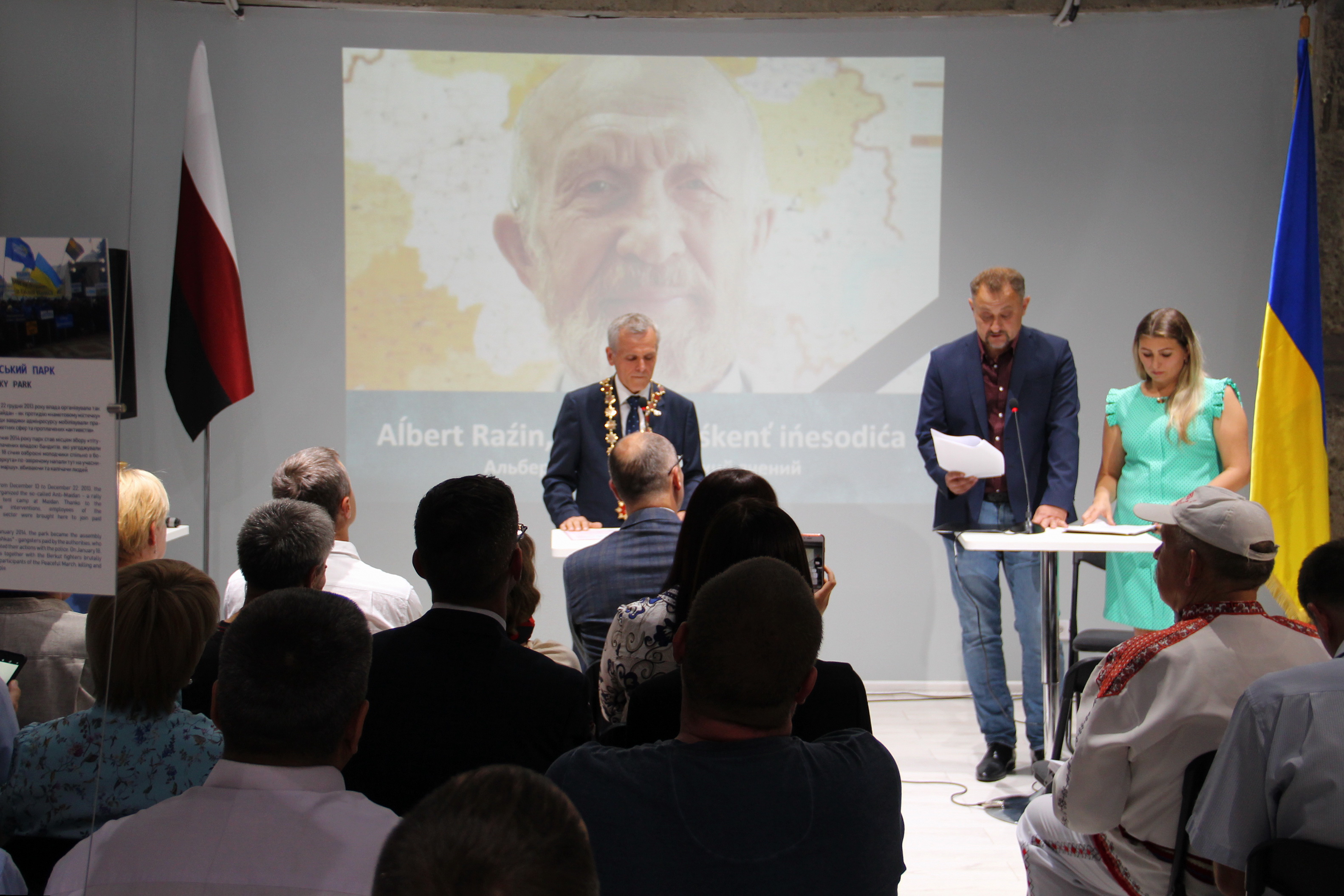
Inauguration of Syres Bolyaen, one of the founders of Free Idel-Ural. Behind him is a portrait of Albert Razin.

Udmurt separatism focuses on protection of local culture, language and the creation of an Udmurt state. Udmurt separatism is supported by various Finno-Ugric organizations. The main organizations are Congress of Peoples of Udmurtia and Udmurt Kenesh movement. Many ethnic Udmurts were not allowed to have seats in local parliaments due to fears that they might cause more separatism in the republic.

In 2019, Udmurt linguist and activist Albert Razin committed self-immolation due to Russia's new laws on its native languages. He became a symbol of Udmurt separatists and activists.

Promotion of Udmurt culture and language has been seen as separatism due to western support of those projects. And some delegates of the World Congress of Finno-Ugric Peoples have supported the idea of an independent Udmurt state. Some Russian political scientists believe that western support of Finno-Ugric cultures in Russia is a tool used by Finland, Estonia and Hungary to cause the collapse of the country.

Udmurt separatists are represented on the Free Nations of Post-Russia Forum.

=== Ural Federal District ===
Separatism in the Ural Federal District is primarily represented by the Ural Republic separatists.

==== Ural Republic ====
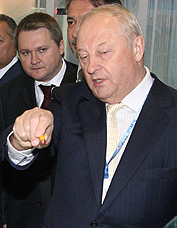
Eduard Rossel

The Ural Republic is a proposed state within the border of Sverdlovsk, Chelyabinsk, Kurgan and Orenburg Oblasts, and Perm Krai.

Originally the idea was suggested by the Governor of Sverdlovsk Oblast, Eduard Rossel, in 1992, but it was not separatist in nature. In July 1993 Sverdlovsk Oblast Council proclaimed a new federal subject of Russia — Ural Republic. In September, a treaty was signed heads of Kurgan, Orenburg, Perm, Sverdlovsk, and Chelyabinsk regions on their intention to participate in the development of joint local economic union of the Ural Republic. On November 9, 1993, President Yeltsin liquidated the Ural Republic by decree and dissolved the Sverdlovsk Oblast council. Russian government figures believed that creating a majority Russian republic will resolve in the dissolution of Russia.

The main movements are the Ural Republic Movement, Free Ural, and The Ural Democratic foundation. However, political scientists believe that modern Ural separatists and regionalists have not yet formed a broad organization that could unite the smaller movements. The local elite have much less sway over the federal government, compared to the republics, which prevents growth of separatism in the region.

Ural separatists are represented on the Free Nations of Post-Russia Forum.

=== Siberian Federal District ===
Separatism in the Siberian Federal District is primarily represented by the Siberian separatists and ethnic separatists in the republics.

==== Siberia ====
Flag used by Siberian separatists

Siberian separatism started to develop after the publication of proclamations "To the Patriots of Siberia" by Nikolay Yadrintsev, one of the founders of Siberian regionalism. He is also one of the first people to advocate non-ethnic separatism in Russia, stating that the unity of language and faith does not serve as an obstacle to separation of the same people into different states.

Modern Siberian separatism began late 80s, when students of the Tomsk University students, who tried to create a pro-independence political party in May 1990. Siberian separatism was especially common among anarchists, especially anarcho-syndicalists. Tomsk was the centre of Siberian separatism, while movements in Novosibirsk and Omsk were more autonomy focused. Idea of an independent Siberia was supported by the intelligentsia and some of the workers effected by the privatization.

In 1991 the Siberian Independence party was created, but it was dissolved in 1993 after not gaining enough support.

In September 1993 during the Russian constitutional crisis, when Siberian governors and deputies demanded simultaneous presidential and parliamentary elections. They also announced the creation of a new federal subject of Russia — the Siberian Republic —, and claimed that if their demands were not met, they would stop the export of all resources and the payment of taxes to the federal center.

In 1997, Siberian deputies and governors created a new political party that defended interests of Siberian and Far Eastern regions and called for more autonomy, their end goal was winning presidential elections.

In early 2000s, local activists in Tomsk tried to create a new language based on Old Siberian dialects, but the group was banned by 2010s.

There are many Siberian regionalist movements, but the largest one was the March for Federalization of Siberia in 2014. The movement also coined the phrase "Stop feeding Moscow!", which is now used by other separatists.

The main causes of separatism are economic dependence and Chinese influence over Siberian economy and ecology.

Siberian separatists are represented on the Free Nations of Post-Russia Forum. Siberian separatists organized a pro-Ukrainian volunteer unit in 2023 as a part of the Civic Council.

Siberian separatism only becomes a threat during a time of crisis, as most Siberians don't have their own national identity, during a poll held in Omsk in 2010, more than 70% of respondents believed that Siberians and Russians are the same people.

===== Opinion polls =====
Reference
| Support for autonomy within Russia in 1993 | | | Support for independence in late 1990s | | | |
| Region | Early 1993 | Late 1993 | Region | Yes | No | Undecided |
|---|---|---|---|---|---|---|
| Novosibirsk | 20% | 12% | Novosibirsk oblast | 1/3 | 1/3 | 1/3 |
| Novosibirsk | 20% | 12% | Kemerovo oblast | 46% | 1/3 | 1/5 |

==== Tuva ====
Tuvan separatism was at its strongest in the early 2000s, when various movements such as Free Tuva protested the new Tuvan constitution. The first modern Tuvan separatist organizations began in the 80s, with the creation of the Kaadyr-ool Bichildea movement. Other separatist organizations of pre-2000s include the People's Party of Sovereign Tuva and People's Front of Tuva.

Tuvan separatism is aided by the fact that Tuva is one of the poorest regions of Russia, and ethnic Russians are a very small minority in the Republic.

Tuvan separatists are represented on the Free Nations of Post-Russia Forum.

=== Far Eastern Federal District ===
Separatism in the Far Eastern Federal District is primarily pushed for by Buryats, and Russians concerned about economic dependence on Moscow or economic exploitation.

==== Buryatia ====
Buryat separatism may refer either to the idea of an independent Buryat state or the idea of Buryatia uniting with Mongolia. The biggest Buryat separatist movement is the Free Buryatia Foundation, which, while not advocating for full independence, is represented on the Free Nations of Post-Russia Forum.

On March 10, 2023, the organization was entered by the Ministry of Justice of the Russian Federation in the register of “foreign agents”. On September 1, 2023, it became known that the foundation was declared an “undesirable organization” in Russia.

Vladimir Khamutayev is a Buryat dissident, professor, doctor of historical sciences, who emigrated to the United States in 2015. The reason for emigration was persecution by the authorities after Vladimir published his book “Buryatia's accession to Russia: history, law, politics”, which refutes the myth of Buryat-Mongolia's voluntary annexation to Russia. The Russian authorities declared the professor a separatist and opened a criminal case against him. Together with Vladimir Khamutayev, Marina Khankhalaeva co-founded the national movement “Tusgaar Buryad-Mongolia” (“Independence of Buryat-Mongolia”, the pre-revolutionary name of Buryatia). In 2023, as a leader of the movement, Khanhalaeva spoke at the European Parliament within the Forum of Free Peoples of Russia: she told about the forced Christianization of Buryats, the suppression of national resistance, collectivization, repressions of the 30s, destruction of Buddhist temples, religious objects and religious books. Marina also mentioned the disbanding of the Buryat autonomous districts that are now part of Irkutsk Oblast and Trans-Baikal Krai; spoke about the current plight of the Buryat language and the racism that Buryats suffer outside their republic.

==== Far Eastern Republic ====
Flag of the Far-Eastern Republic

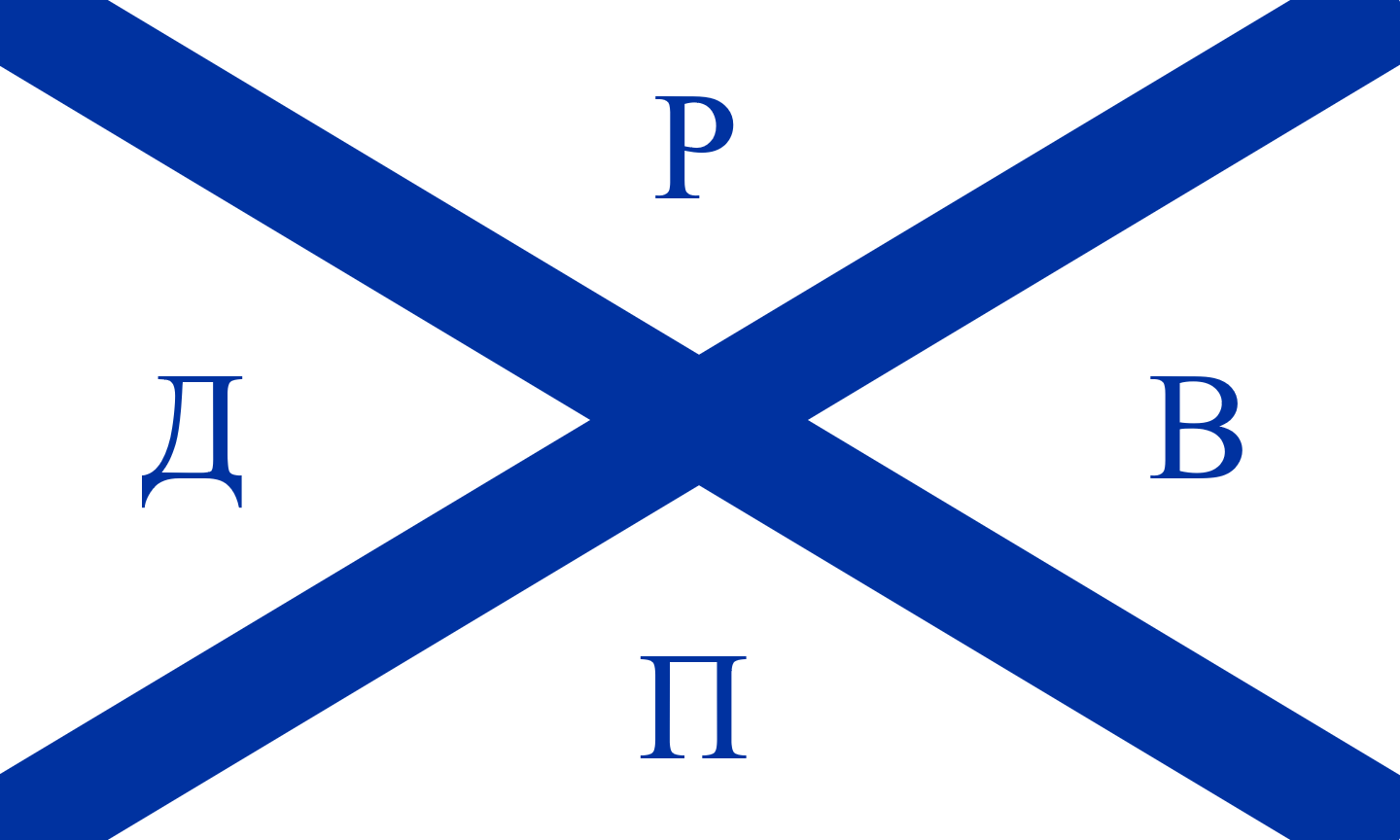
Flag of the Far-Eastern Republican party

Following the dissolution of the Soviet Union, political parties such as the Far-Eastern Republican Party and the Far-Eastern Republican Freedom Party called for the establishment of the Far Eastern Republic. The Far-Eastern Republican Party has advocated for the creation of an independent Far Eastern Republic, seen as the continuation of the historical Far East. The Far-Eastern Republican Freedom Party called for the formation of an far eastern autonomous republic within Russia. Proposals generally envision a state covering the entire Far Eastern Federal District, with the exclusion of the Sakha Republic and the Republic of Buryatia. The separatists see the proposed republic as the continuation of the historical Far Eastern Republic.

The idea for an autonomous republic was supported by the former Governor of Khabarovsk Krai, Viktor Ishayev.

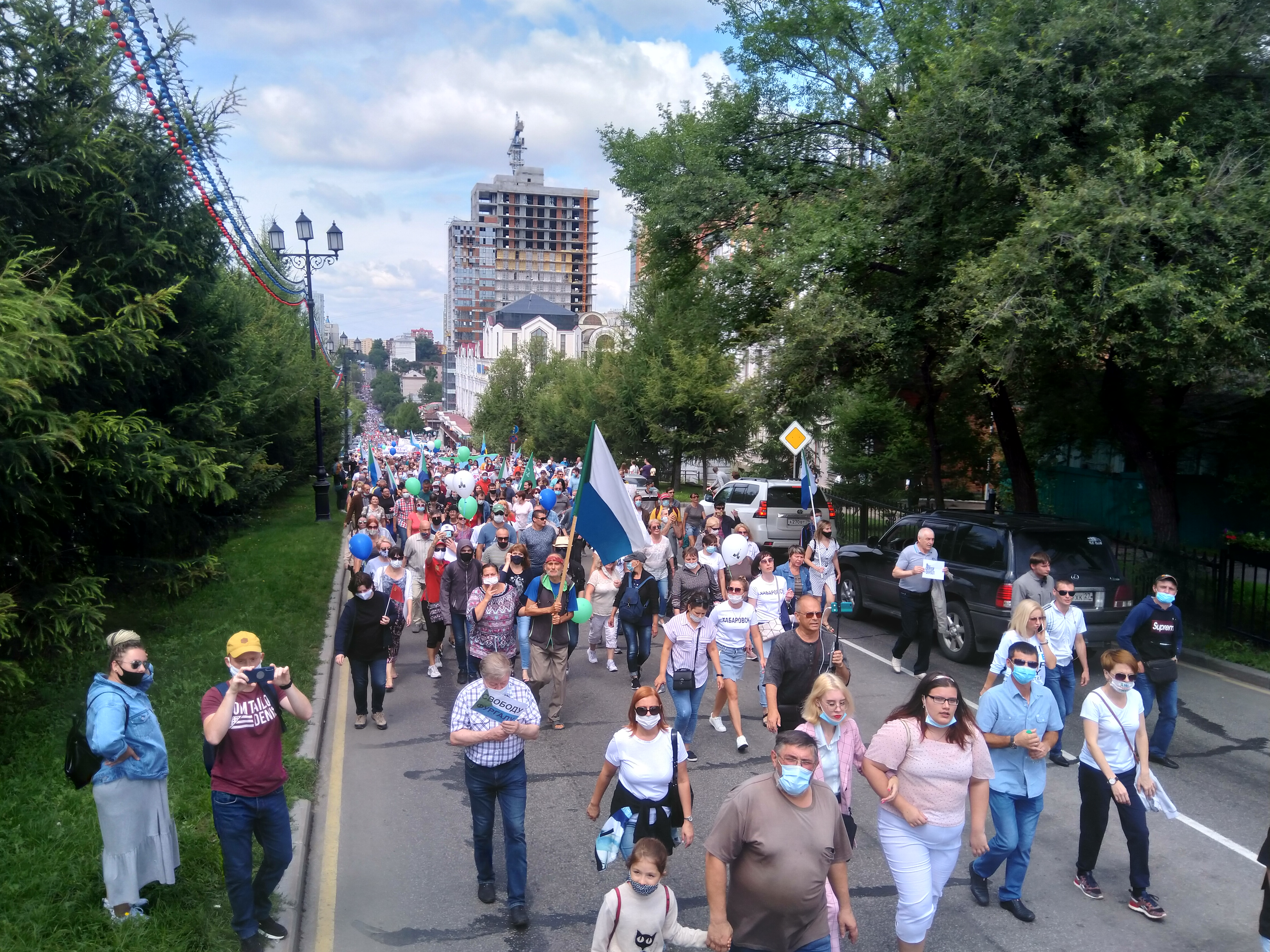
2020–2021 Khabarovsk Krai protests

The biggest current movement is "Movement for a Far Eastern Republic", but other movements such as the Far Eastern Alternative have participated in various anti government protests. Far Eastern separatism is primarily caused by economic dependence on Moscow.

During the 2020–2021 Khabarovsk Krai protests, some people advocated for the independence of Khabarovsk Krai.

The Far Eastern Republic has been represented on the Free Nations of Post-Russia Forum as the Pacific Federation since 2022.

==== Sakha ====
Sakha or Yakut separatism seeks the creation of an independent Yakutian state. The primary cause of Yakut separatism is economic exploitation by the federal government. Some journalists and politicians suggested that Turkey supports Sakha separatism financially and politically.

Yakutia is a region that is extremely important for the Russian Federation in terms of geopolitics. Russian propagandist Alexander Dugin in his magnum opus “Foundations of Geopolitics” writes: “Yakutia has such a strategic location, which gives all the prerequisites for becoming an independent region, independent of Moscow. This is ensured by the long coastline, the meridional structure of the republic's territories, and its technical detachment from other Siberian regions. Under certain circumstances, Yakutia may become the main base of the Atlanticist strategy, from which the thalassocracy will restructure the Pacific coast of Eurasia and try to turn it into a classic rimland controlled by the “sea power. The increased attention of the Atlantists to the Pacific area and Makinder's highly indicative allocation of Lenaland to a special category and then inclusion of this territory in the rimland zone in the maps of the Atlantists Speakman and Kirk indicate that at the first opportunity, the anticontinental forces will try to take the region weakly connected with the center out from under the Eurasian control”. At the same time, Dugin draws attention to the existence of a tradition of political separatism in Yakutia, although artificial, but still fixed.

As early as the Soviet period, the region witnessed quite active separatist tendencies. Thus, according to researcher Valery Yaremenko, “there is data on the uprisings of Yakuts and Nenets, against whom military aviation was used in December 1942. Daring and very successful raids of the rebels forced the authorities to create a special body of operational leadership to eliminate them”.

There is also a religious basis for Yakutia's national-separatist movement. Back in the 1990s, some representatives of local intelligentsia (L. Afanasyev, I. Ukhkhana, etc.) developed the doctrine of Yakut neo-paganism. Thus, in 1993 the pagan community “Kut-Syur”, called “Aiyy's doctrine” and representing a modernized Yakut version of the common Turkic religion - Tengrianism - emerged. Moreover, local pagans consider the Yakuts to be the “chosen people” who have preserved the true, original faith. “... Dreams about the high mission of Yakuts, who should return the true faith of their ancestors - Tengrianism - to the Turks of the whole world, are not limited only to the Turkic world. Sometimes in their speeches sound hopes that Russians, Europe, and America will someday be able to return to the path of truth...”

In due time, the AiYi teachings were introduced by the Ministry of Education of Yakutia into the teaching plans of secondary, specialized secondary and higher educational institutions. The College of Culture, which trains specialists for Houses of Culture, actually turned into a center for training specialists in conducting pagan rites, prayers and festivals.

The biggest movement is the Free Yakutia Movement, which is represented on the Free Nations of Post-Russia Forum.

=== Ethnic Russian separatism ===
Flag of the Zalessian Rus' Movement

In mid 2010s the National Democratic Alliance advocated for creation of Russian national republics. The party leader, Alexey Shiropaev, expressed doubts about the unity of the Russian people and considers Russian nation as a conglomerate of sub-ethnic groups that differ both psychologically and physiologically. He advocated Russian separatism, believing that it will be easier to defend the interests of Russians in a few small Russian states than in a large multinational empire. Shiropaev supported the idea of dividing Russia into seven Russian republics and turning it into a "federative commonwealth of nations."

Alexey Shiropaev proposed to transform the Central Federal District into the Republic of Zalessian Rus and form a "Zalessian self-consciousness" in it. A Russian neo-Nazi Ilya Lazarenko leads the separatist movement "Zalessian Rus". He currently resides in Cyprus.

One of the founders of the movement, Alexey Shiropaev, later turned to far-right Russian nationalism.

=== Minor movements ===
Many other small separatist movements exist within Russia, but most of them have little to no support and function as online groups.

== Irredentism in Russia ==
Many peoples living in Russia are related or identical to the titular ethnic groups of neighboring countries. In some regions of Russia and neighboring countries, irredentist ideas about the reunification of divided peoples are being expressed by some of the local population. But most separatist movements are not interested in joining other countries, while some movements want to join organizations like the European Union, they do not seek a new overlord.

In Kazakhstan, nationalist circles often voice demands for the return of Orenburg (formerly the capital of the Kazakh (then Kyrgyz) ASSR in 1920) and the southern part of the Omsk Oblast and the Astrakhan Oblast.

== Legal aspects ==
In various regions, governors have begun to set up “headquarters to prevent threats of emergence and spread of separatism, nationalism, mass riots and extremist crimes”. So far, three cases are reliably known - in the Republic of Buryatia, Voronezh and Oryol regions.

=== List of separatist organizations according to the Federal Security Service ===
On 28th of December, 2024, the Federal Security Service expanded their list of terrorist and extremist organizations with 172 separatist organizations. The agency claims that all organizations are members of the Free Nations of Post-Russia Forum and that they do not function as separate entities.

However, some of the organizations on this list openly denied their involvement with separatism or the Forum.

== See also ==
- Free Nations of Post-Russia Forum
- Proposed federal subjects of Russia
- Dissolution of Soviet Union
- List of active separatist movements in Europe
- Separatism in Kazakhstan
- Separatism in Uzbekistan
- Russian Far East
- Far Eastern Republic

== Bibliography ==
- Ремизова, М.В. (2013). Карта этнорелигиозных угроз: Северный Кавказ и Поволжье (in Russian). Moscow: Институт национальной стратегии.
- Шнирельман, В.А. (2015). Арийский миф в современном мире (in Russian). Moscow: НЛО. ISBN 9785444804223.
- Штепа, Вадим (2012). INTERREGNUM. 100 вопросов и ответов о регионализме (in Russian). Petrozavodsk: Изд. ИП Цыкарев А.В. ISBN 978-5-9903769-1-5.
- Штепа, Вадим (2019). Возможна ли Россия после империи? (in Russian). Yekaterinburg: Издательские решения. ISBN 978-5-4496-0796-6.
