= Republican Movement of Karelia =

Regionalist party in Russia

- Republican Movement of Karelia _{Республиканское движение Карелии} _{Karjalan Tasavallan Liike} _{Karjalan Tazavallan Liike}
- Darker version of the 1918 Otava flag used by the organization
- Formation: January 10, 2014; 12 years ago
- Founder: Vadim Vladimirovich Shtepa
- Dissolved: August 14, 2019; 6 years ago
- Purpose: Regionalism; Separatism; Federalism; Confederalism
- Location: Republic of Karelia, Russia
- Leader: Emelyanova Ekaterina Valentinovna _{since 2016}
- Website: https://free-karelia.org/

The Republican Movement of Karelia (Russian: Республиканское движение Карелии) or Karelian Republican Movement (Finnish: Karjalan Tasavallan Liike; Karelian: Karjalan Tazavallan Liike) or RMK was a Karelian regionalist and separatist organization founded by a Russian philosopher and author Vadim Vladimirovich Shtepa and registered in January 2014.

The organization became inactive after Vadim Shtepa was arrested in December 2015 and was dissolved in August 2019.

== History ==
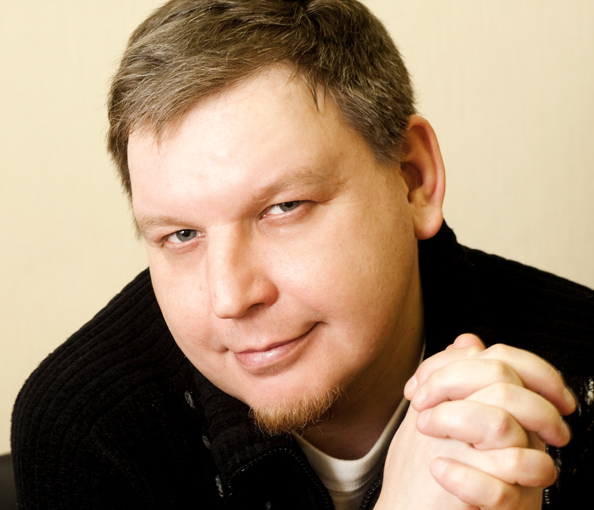
Vadim Vladimirovich Shtepa, the founder of the RMK

The RMK started off as an internet forum about separatism and regionalism in the late 2000s but later registered as a public organization on 10 January 2014.

The organization participated in various protests, such as protests for the transfer of jurisdiction of the Kizhi Pogost back from the Russian Ministry of Culture to the government of the Republic of Karelia and the protest against visa-free travel between Russia and Central Asian countries. And protests against the former head of the Republic of Karelia, Aleksandr Hudilainen.

The RMK also focused on expanding and popularizing Karelian culture with projects such as National Kyykkä Assoсiation and Onegaborg radio, which only broadcast songs from Karelia.

The organization also had candidates during the 2014 Petrozavodsk city council election but did not secure any seats.

On 4 December 2015, Vadim Shtepa was arrested for distribution of extremist materials on the same day an article was posted on Respublika, the news website of the government of the Republic of Karelia, where the Head of the Republic of Karelia, Aleksandr Hudilainen, condemns Shtepa of extremism, saying that “extremists will have no will either in Petrozavodsk or in Karelia”. After this incident, Vadim Shtepa moved to Estonia.

The organization continued to legally exist under the leadership of Emelyanova Ekaterina Valentinovna until its liquidation on 14 August 2019. It was almost completely inactive, but in 2017 the movement introduced three bills to the Legislative Assembly of the Republic of Karelia, which suggested the use of the languages of the indigenous Baltic-Finnish peoples of Karelia in the ballots during elections, but the proposal was rejected.

== Goals ==
RMK was created as an organization that aimed to gain more autonomy for the Republic of Karelia as a part of the Russian Federation, however, some local journalists and politicians believed that it was separatist in nature.

Other goals included the creation of a multi-cultural state of Russians, Karelians, Finns, Vepsians, Zaonezhians, Pomors and other ethnic groups of Karelia; creation of parliamentary republic and diversification of the economy; renaming of streets and cities to more Karelian names; liquidation of "United Russia" in Karelia and the law enforcement agencies serving it; revival of the transboundary project "Euroregion Karelia"; ecological protection and technological modernization of the country.

The organization supported the ideas of civic nationalism and opposed ethnonationalism.

The movement rejected the idea of unifying with Finland, seeing it as "a colony wanting to change its overlord".

== See also ==
- Karelian National Movement
- Separatism in Russia
- Regionalism
