= Vadim Shtepa =

- Вадим Штепа
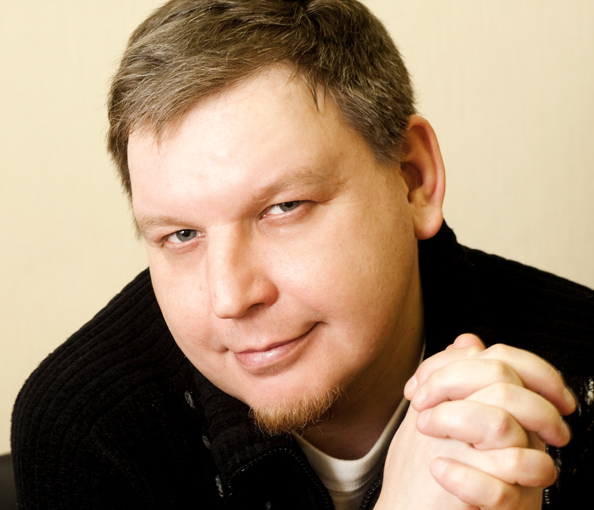
- Shtepa in 2013
- Born: 5 August 1970; Petrozavodsk, Karelian ASSR, Soviet Union

Education
- Education: Moscow State University

Philosophical work
- Language: Russian, Estonian
- Main interests: Separatism in Russia and the Soviet Union; Self-determination
- Notable ideas: Regionalism and separatism in modern Russia; Non-ethnic separatism Glocalization
- Website: https://region.expert

Vadim Vladimirovich Shtepa (Russian: Вади́м Влади́мирович Ште́па, Estonian: Vadim Vladimirovitš Štepa) (born 5 August 1970) is a Russian philosopher, publicist, poet and analyst of Russian regions. Since 2015, he lives in Estonia, where he publishes analytical articles on Russian regions and politics.

== Biography ==
Vadim Shtepa was born in Petrozavodsk, Karelia on 5 August 1970. He spent his childhood in Crimea, Krasnoyarsk Krai, and the Arctic. Graduated from the Faculty of Journalism of Moscow State University. Vadim Shtepa was forced to leave Russia in 2015 after threats of arrest and repression because his comments on the Russian social media platform Vkontake were considered "extremist" by the government of the Republic of Karelia.

== Career ==
In 2006–2008, he wrote a column on Garry Kasparov’s website, which gave opponents a reason to call him "a true idialogue of ‘National Orangeism’."

From 2009 to 2013, he was a regular contributor to the Russian Journal. According to Igor Sid’s review, Shtepa is one of the leaders and conceptualizers of the Russian intellectual movement for the cultural self-determination of regions.

Shtepa also contributed to various Russian news websites, such as Radio Svoboda and various local Karelian newspapers.

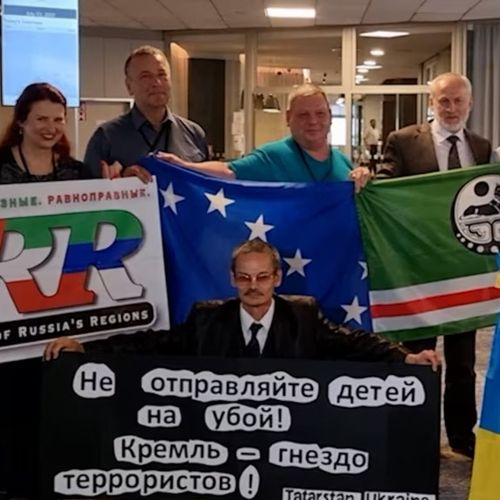
Vadim Shtepa (second from the right) with the flag of the RMK during the Second Free Nations of Post-Russia Forum

From 2014 to 2015 he was the head of the Republican Movement of Karelia, a regionalist pro-autonomy organization in the Republic of Karelia.

After he was forced to leave Russia he moved to Estonia and continued his work there. In 2019 he became the editor-in-chief of his internet magazine about separatism and regionalism in Russia Region.Expert.

Vadim Shtepa also works as an analyst of Russian regions for Eesti Päevaleht.

== Published works ==
=== Books ===
- ИNBЕРСИЯ (1998) (Inversion)
- RUТОПИЯ (2004) (Rutopia)
- ЗАМЕТКИ RUТОПИСТА (2008) (Notes of a Rutopist)
- РУССКОЕ БУДУЩЕЕ (2008) (Russian Future)
- ДЕТИ СЕВЕРНОГО ВЕТРА (2011) (Children of the Northern Wind)
- INTERREGNUM, 100 вопросов и ответов о регионализме (2012) (INTERREGNUM, 100 Questions and Answers About Regionalism)
- ВОЗМОЖНА ЛИ РОССИЯ ПОСЛЕ ИМПЕРИИ? (2018) (Is Russia Possible After Empire?)

=== Notable online contributions ===
- Agency of Political News
- Russian Journal
- Spektr.Press (Latvia)
- Delfi (Lithuania)
- Postimees (Estonia)
- Russian Forbes
- The New Times
- International Centre for Defence and Security (Estonia)
- The Jamestown Foundation (US)
- Radio Free Europe
- Eesti Päevaleht (Estonia)
