= Free Nations of Post-Russia Forum =

Forum in Russia

Free Nations of Post-Russia Forum Форум свободных народов Пост-России
- Abbreviation: FNRF (English); FSNP (Russian)
- Leader: Ruslan Gabbasov
- Founder: Oleg Magaletsky
- Founded: 8 May 2022
- Split from: Free Russia Forum
- Headquarters: Warsaw, Poland
- Ideology: Anti-Putinism; Anti-imperialism; Indigenism; Regionalism; Separatism; Factions: Social liberalism Anti-communism; Pro-Europeanism
- Political position: Big tent

Website
- freenationsrf.org

Proposed map of former Russian territories

The Free Nations of Post-Russia Forum (FNRF or FSNR; Russian: Форум свободных народов пост-России, romanized: Forum svobodnykh narodov Post-Rossii) is a forum founded by Ukrainian restaurant business owner Oleg Magaletsky, exiled Russian separatists, as well as foreign sympathizers, which advocates for the disintegration of Russia. It was registered in Poland.

On 17 March 2023, the forum was designated an "undesirable organization" in Russia.

== Goals ==
The forum participants set as their goal the separation of the Russian Federation into independent constituent states. At the second forum, the topics for discussion included the deimperialization, decolonization, de-Putinization, denazification, demilitarization, and denuclearization of Russia. The forum participants also appealed to the national and regional elites of United Nations member countries, urging them to begin creating national provisional governments-in-exile.

According to French historian and sociologist Marlene Laruelle, the calls of the forum participants for the "liberation of enslaved peoples" refer to the slogan "prison of peoples" from the times of the Russian Empire and to the CIA-sponsored Anti-Bolshevik Bloc of Nations during the Cold War.

== Participants ==
The Forum features a dynamic and diverse lineup of participants and speakers, including opposition activists, politicians in forced exile, and influential leaders of national movements across Russia's varied regions. They are joined by statesmen, diplomats, and politicians from Europe, Asia, and North America, as well as experts in military affairs, economists, political scientists, esteemed religious authorities, and accomplished journalists.

According to the publications Meduza and Novaya Gazeta, the organizer of the forum is Ukrainian entrepreneur Oleg Magaletsky, who is also a restaurant business owner and Euromaidan participant. Magaletsky states that the forum has two goals: to prepare Russian citizens for the possibility of the country's collapse, and to garner acceptance of this idea among Western nations. He mentions that the forum's sponsors change each time, alternating between European public organizations and philanthropists from Ukraine. Some organisations are not listed as they have no functioning body.

=== List of member organizations ===
As of 2023 according to the EU the following member organizations and their respective proposed political entities are:

Proposed entity	Flag	Organizations
Adyghea		
Arkhangelsk		Karelian National Movement
Astrakhan		Oirat-Kalmyk People’s Congress
Bashkortostan		Bashkort Movement, Bashkir National Political Center
Buryatia		Free Buryatia Foundation
Central Federal District		
Chechnya		Chechen government in exile
Chuvashia		Free Idel-Ural
Far Eastern Federal District		
Ingushetia		Committee of Ingush Independence
Kaliningrad		Kaliningrad Public Movement, Republika Movementà
Kalmykia		Congress of the Oirat-Kalmyk People
Karelia		Karelian National Movement
Komi		
Krasnodar		
St Petersburg		Free Ingria, Ingria without borders
Mari El		Free Idel-Ural
Mordovia		Erzya National Congress, Free Idel-Ural
Pskov		Krivian Platform
Rostov Oblast		
Sakha		Free Yakutia
Smolensk		Smalandia
Siberian Federal District		
Tatarstan		Free Idel-Ural, All Tatar Public Center, Ittifaq Party
Tuva		
Ural Federal District		

When Russian authorities listed the Forum as "undesirable" on 17 March 2023 they noted that there where 172 member organizations in the Forum. Among them was the Congress of the Peoples of the North Caucasus.

== Forums ==
=== Forum I ===
The first forum convened on 8–9 May 2022, in Warsaw, Poland.

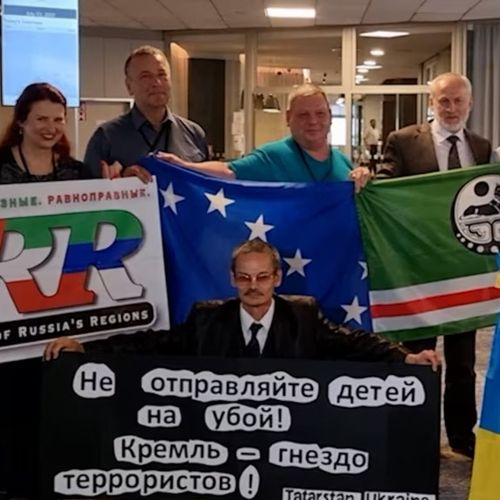
Second forum

=== Forum II ===
The second forum was held in Prague on 23 July 2022. The Declaration on the Decolonization of Russia was signed by 30 representatives of various organizations, the declaration of future borders and relations between participants.

=== Forum III ===
The third forum was held in Gdansk on 23–25 September 2022. The forum was renamed from Free Nations of Russia Forum to Free Nations of Post-Russia Forum. Representatives of organizations also signed the Gdansk Manifesto, which called upon the EU and NATO to support separatism in Russia.

=== Forum IV ===
The fourth forum was held in Helsingborg, Sweden on 7–11 December 2022. The Forum attendees organized online independence referendums for Ingria, Kuban, Siberia and Ural.

=== Forum V ===
The fifth forum was held in the European Parliament in Brussels on 31 January 2023. Participants in the forum adopted a declaration where they stated that "the future of every liberated people and region should be decided by the people and region themselves based on the principle of self-determination of the nation, up to secession and other generally recognized norms of international law." Members organizations also requested financial support from the EU and NATO. The forum caused conflict among the wider Russian opposition, with some claiming that the forum was organized by "freaks".

=== Forum VI ===
The sixth forum was held at the Hudson Institute, Washington D.C., the Philadelphia City Hall, and the Ukrainian Institute of America, New York on 25–28 April 2023.

=== Forum VII ===
The seventh forum was held in the Japanese Parliament on 1–2 August 2023. Yosuke Suzuki claimed that the Japanese government might support the separatists in the future, as Japan has territorial claims against Russia. For the first time two non Russian movements Cantonia and The American Hokkienese autonomy Association partook in the forum.

=== Forum VIII ===
The eighth forum was held in London and Paris on 26–28 September 2023.

=== Forum IX ===
The ninth forum was held in Senate of the Republic and Berlin on 11–14 December 2023. Participants signed a decree, proclaiming the priority of the currently existing administrative boundaries between the constituent entities of the Russian Federation in order to prevent possible future conflicts. After the forum the Investigative Committee of Russia threatened all speakers with criminal cases.

=== Forum X ===
The tenth forum was held in Washington DC in April 2024.

=== Forum XI ===
The eleventh forum was held in the Seimas of Lithuania on June 16, 2024

=== Forum XII/ September 2024 - Taiwan ===
On September 18–19, 2024, the XII Free Nations of Post-Russia Forum "Design of the Post-Russia Space and Impact on the Macroregions of East, Southeast and Central Asia" was held in Taipei (Taiwan).

The event was attended by representatives of separatist movements in Russia and China, with the participation of the intellectual circle of political scientists, diplomats, visionaries, public and political figures of the USA, Poland, Ukraine, Lithuania, Italy, Austria, Ingria, Estonia, Germany, Japan, South Korea, Taiwan, Buryatia, Tibet, Karafuto, Thailand, the Philippines and others. As a result of the XI Forum of Free States of Post-Russia, the Appeal of Taiwan was signed.

=== Forum XIII/ October 2024 - Montreal ===
The 13th Free Nations of Post-Russia Forum was held on November 19 in Ottawa, including in the Parliament of Canada. The event was attended not only by experts and diplomats (including the ambassadors of Poland, Lithuania and Bulgaria to Canada), but also by a number of members of the Parliament of Canada, primarily from the Conservative Party (including shadow Minister of Defense James Bezan and MP Shuvaloy Majumdar), representatives of Bloc Québécois (MP René Villemure and MP Alain Therrien). The key local partners and co-organizers of the events in Ottawa were the leading geopolitical think tank in Canada - the Macdonald-Laurier Institute. Among the features of the event, it is worth noting an attempt by the Russian special services to infiltrate their own agent in the organization, Nomma Zarubina.

=== Forum XIV / December 2024 - Vienna ===
The 14th Free Nations of Post-Russia Forum was held on December 12 and 13 in Vienna, in particular, a series of non-public meetings were held directly in the Austrian Parliament.

The partner in Austria was the Pan-European Union. Among the speakers, in particular, were the Vice-President of the Pan-European Union Walburga Habsburg Douglas, the President of Paneuropa Austria Rainhard Kloucek, the Secretary General of Paneuropa Spain Carlos Uriarte Sánchez, Dietmar Pichler and others. Among the speakers and participants of the event were also 2 members of the Austrian Parliament: MP Andreas Minnich and MP Dominik Oberhofer, as well as two members of the European Parliament from Austria: MEP Lukas Mandl and MEP Helmut Brandstätter.

In his speech, one of the leaders of the Pan-European Union and head of the House of Habsburg-Lorraine, Karl von Habsburg, called on European leaders to join the process of final decolonization of Muscovy-Russia, as the last colonial empire in Europe.

The speech caused a great resonance in Moscow both among supporters of Putin's regime and among the opposition. Chairman of the Investigative Committee Alexander Bastrykin opened an investigation into the statements of Karl von Habs-burg. The corresponding statements were made by Sergei Markov, Yulia Latynina and Gennadiy Gudkov.

== Future endeavors ==
As part of the continuation of strategic cooperation between the Free Nations of Post-Russia Forum and the Pan-European Union, the next joint event (the 15th Free Nations of Post-Russia Forum) on March 19, 2025 at the Romanian Parliament in Bucharest has already been announced. Also, during 2025, the Forum of Free Nations of Post-Russia (June 25–26 in Washington, South Korea and one of the capitals of Northern Europe) has already been announced), the key aspects of the agenda of the event will be the issues of security and cooperation in the Black Sea region, the Balkans and in Europe as a whole in the context of the probable decolonization of Russia and the emergence of new states in the post-Russian territories.

== Criticism ==
According to Russian political scientist Alexander Kynev, the forum was organized by "certain forces abroad who have little understanding of the mood inside the country and who do not take into account the extremely negative memories of the majority of its inhabitants" regarding the collapse of the Soviet Union. He stated that with their program to create national states in place of Russia, they presented "a gift to Russian propaganda, which already periodically claims that Russia’s enemies want to fragment and destroy it." Kynev also condemned the idea of the collapse of the Russian Federation, fearing it would lead to "wars, territorial disputes, and ethnic cleansing."

French historian and sociologist Marlène Laruelle writes that Western politicians should not confuse the radical statements of political exiles at the Forum of Free Peoples of Russia with the opinions of Russian citizens. She condemned the advocacy by some Western politicians for the disintegration of Russia as a false strategy that would be “a disaster for international security” and which stems from a misunderstanding of what exactly "holds Russian society together in all its diversity."

American historian and political scientist Alexander Motyl questioned whether the forum participants represent anyone, stating that "political emigrants around the world have a long history of loud statements that ultimately lead nowhere." However, he noted that in some cases political emigrants did gain power, citing examples like Vladimir Lenin, Leon Trotsky, Ayatollah Khomeini, Ho Chi Minh, and Mahatma Gandhi. Therefore, he concluded that "it would be premature to reject the Forum as a meaningless conclave of emigrants."

Russian political scientist Fyodor Krasheninnikov wonders what relation the forum participants have to the Russian opposition, claiming that they “represent no one but themselves, and no one knows them [in the regions]."

Russian economist and political scientist Vladislav Inozemtsev, who took part in the 5th forum at the invitation of the organizers from the European Parliament, believes that the forum “exists only thanks to the efforts of the Ukrainian leadership." In his opinion, it may happen that the border territories—Chechnya, Ingushetia, or Tuva—will secede from Russia, but “there has not been a single case in history where a mono-national state was divided without occupation.”

Vadim Shtepa, a leading Russian regionalist and one of the founders of the organization, withdrew from the Forum in December 2022, condemning it as a "parody" which, instead of performing serious analytical work on de-imperialization, focused on "loud" and "empty" declarations of independence by emigrants that would have no practical effect on their respective regions.

The SVTV Network publication of the politician Mikhail Svetov, there was a message about "state security agents who gathered a forum to remind you that if not Putin, then a civil war" and "painted a contour map without really thinking about the meaning of the proposed reforms."

== Reaction of the Russian authorities ==
On 25 July 2022, the head of Chechnya, Ramzan Kadyrov, ridiculed the Free Nations of Russia Forum held in Prague. He thanked the "pseudo-liberals" for confirming the words of the Russian leadership about attempts to disintegrate the country.

In November 2022, Oleg Ivanov, head of the Center for the Resolution of Social Conflicts, called on Russian special services to "initiate criminal cases of treason, put traitors on the wanted list, and submit requests for their extradition to Interpol" against participants in the Forum of Free Peoples of Russia and the Congress of People's Deputies. He also suggested "remembering the precepts of the famous Soviet intelligence officer Pavel Sudoplatov," implying the murder of political emigrants abroad.

On 17 March 2023, the Russian Prosecutor General's Office declared the forum an "undesirable organization." According to the office, "the organization’s activities pose a threat to the foundations of the constitutional order and security of the Russian Federation," and its leaders "call for the violation of the territorial integrity of the Russian Federation and promote separatist nationalist slogans."

In early August 2023, the Russian Foreign Ministry lodged an official protest with the Japanese Embassy over a meeting of the Forum of Free Peoples of Post-Russia held in Tokyo. Allegedly, the forum promoted separatist ideology. Moscow considered that assisting the forum constituted an act of interference in Russia's internal affairs. The ministry also noted that many participants in the meeting are recognized in Russia as extremists and foreign agents. "Such practices, capable of completely destroying the remnants of normal relations dismantled by the Japanese government, must be stopped immediately, and Japanese apologists of terrorist ideas must suffer well-deserved punishment," stated a note of protest published on the Russian Foreign Ministry's website. The ministry warned their Japanese counterparts that if such a "provocation" were repeated, they should prepare for the "most sensitive" retaliatory steps from the Kremlin.

Karl von Habsburg's speech at the Forum of Free Nations of PostRussia caused a great resonance in Moscow both among supporters of Putin's regime and among the so-called opposition. Chairman of the Investigative Committee Bastrykin opened an investigation into Carl von Habsburg's statements. Corresponding statements were made by Sergei Markov, Yulia Latynina, and Gennady Gudkov.

== See also ==
- Congress of the Enslaved Peoples of Russia
- Prometheism
- Pro-independence movements in the Russian Civil War
- Anti-Bolshevik Bloc of Nations
- Free Nations League
