= Far-Eastern Republican party =

Far-Eastern Republican Party Дальне-Восточная Республиканская Партия
- Abbreviation: DVRP
- Leader: Igor Cherevkov
- Founded: July 13, 1990
- Dissolved: 2011
- Headquarters: Vladivostok, Shilkinskaya Street, 21-222 (Former)
- Membership (1990): ~10
- Ideology: Far-Eastern Separatism

Party flag
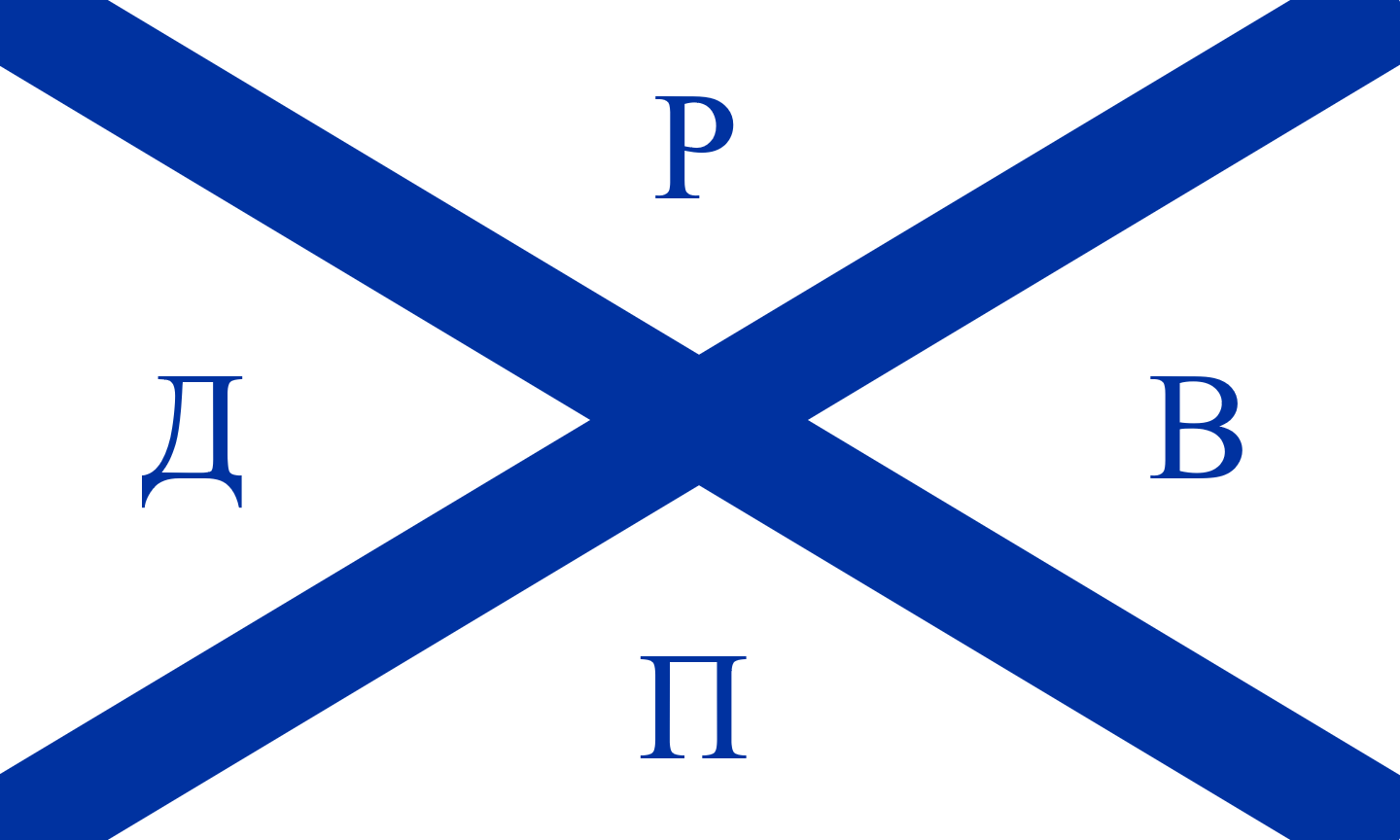

The Far-Eastern Republican Party (Russian: Дальне-Восточная Республиканская Партия, romanized: Dal'ne-Vostochnaya Respublikanskaya Partiya) or DVRP was a political party based in Vladivostok that advocated for the restoration of the Far Eastern Republic.

== History ==
The party was formed on the basis of the Vladivostok branch of the Russian People's Front (RPF) at the Founding Congress on July 13, 1990, in Vladivostok by the secretary of the RPF Igor Cherevkov, at the time the deputy of the Vladivostok City Council who later worked in the administration of the mayor of Vladivostok Viktor Cherepkov.

The party's calls for independence started with the ultimatum sent to president Boris Yeltsin in 1990, asking for the restoration of the historical republic. In 1992, DVRP again called restoration of the Far-Eastern Republic, threatening to form a provisional government and speak at the UN and The Hague if their demands for a referendum on the matter were not met.

The party's leader, Igor Cherevkov, was seen In 2009 on a Vladivostok rally, demanding change of power both in Moscow and in Primorye. He later died in 2017.
