= National Democratic Alliance (Russia) =

National Democratic Alliance Национал-демократический альянс
- Abbreviation: NDA (English); НДА (Russian)
- Leader: Alexey Shiropaev; Ilya Lazarenko; Mikhail Pozharsky
- Founded: 13 March 2010; 16 years ago
- Headquarters: Moscow
- Ideology: Russian nationalism National democracy National liberalism Ethnic federalism Regionalism; Anti-communism; Anti-Sovietism; Anti-immigration; Anti-clericalism; Pro-Europeanism; Atlanticism
- Political position: Right-wing
- Colours: White; Green; Black
- Slogan: "Liberty. Nation. Progress." (Russian: "Свобода. Нация. Прогресс.")

Party flag

Website
- nazdem.info

The National Democratic Alliance (NDA; Russian: Национал-демократический альянс; НДА, romanized: Natsional-demokraticheskiy alyans; NDA) was a social and political movement in the Russian Federation. It supported the creation of several Russian republics, the re-establishment of the Federation, and the establishment of a single federal agreement between the subjects of the Russian Federation. The NDA was co-chaired by Alexey Shiropaev, Ilya Lazarenko, and Mikhail Pozharsky.

The NDA was built as an association of regional movements that are united by a common ideology of achieving national democracy, as well as the goals and objectives laid out in the NDA Manifesto.

NDA was an opposition movement.

Although the movement was not formally disbanded, it effectively ceased any activity in the late 2010s due to the organizers going their separate ways: In 2021, Alexey Shiropaev returned to Imperialist monarchist views, and in 2022, he supported the Russian invasion of Ukraine; Ilya Lazarenko emigrated to Cyprus and supports Ukraine; Mikhail Pozharsky became a bleeding-heart libertarian, rejecting his previous nationalist views, and also supports Ukraine.

== Political stances ==
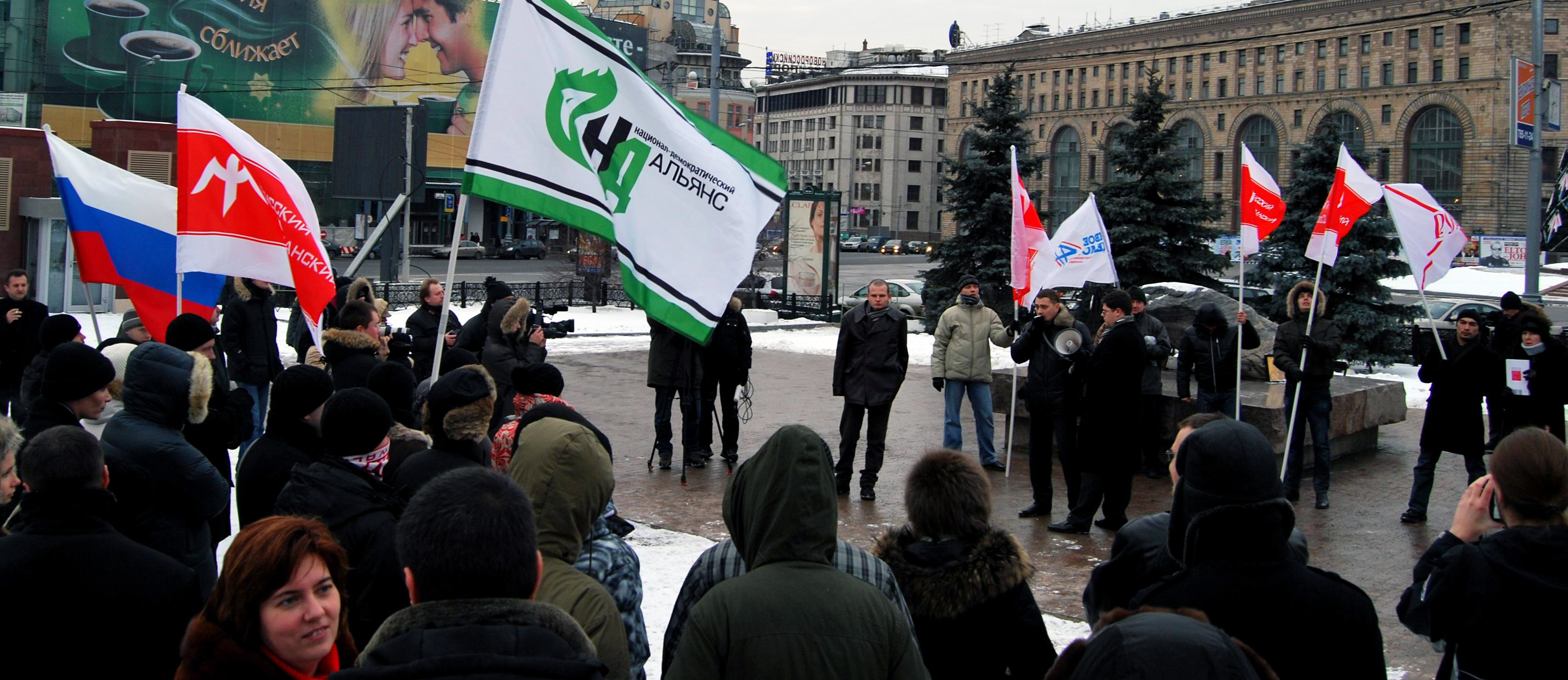
Meeting with the participation of the NDA in memory of the Decembrist uprising. Moscow, Lubyanka, December 12, 2010

- Creation of Russian republics within the Russian Federation and re-establishment of the Federation as a union of national republics.
  - Legal recognition by the renewed Russian Federation of the status of the successor state of the Russian Democratic Federative Republic.
- Expansion of the powers of the regions and real federalism.
- The Democratization of the state and the realization of the rights and freedoms of citizens.
- Rejection of neo-imperial foreign policy.
- Anti-Sovietism, anti-communism, and anti-clericalism.
- Restriction of immigration from the countries of the Transcaucasia, Asia, and the Middle East.
- Protection of private property rights and the development of a market economy.
- Legalization of firearms.
- A course towards consistent rapprochement and cooperation with the European Union, NATO and the United States.

NDA program documents – the Manifesto and Resolution "On the re-establishment of the Russian Federation and the creation of Russian republics" – were adopted at the Constituent Conference.

The movement regularly makes political statements in defence of a free economy, political freedoms, reform of the MVD The NDA officially established friendly relations with the Latvian party Visu Latvijai!

== Symbolism ==
A nettle leaf is selected as the NDA symbol. Movement colors: white, green, black. The colors green and black are especially popular due to the respectful attitude of the NDA participants towards the Green Armies in the Russian Civil War.

== Political actions ==
- Moscow and Baltic tea drinking.
- Picket against amendments to the "Law on the FSB".
- Participates in Strategy-31.
- Collection of signatures in support of the initiative for the withdrawal of Stavropol Krai from the North Caucasian Federal District.
- Film club work.
- Picket "No empire of lies!" in Ostankino.
- Participation in a rally of the Belarusian opposition against the results of the presidential elections in Belarus in Minsk on December 19, 2010.
- Participation in the rally "For Russia without Putin".
- The action "Vlasov Ribbon".
- Visit to Israel. Meeting with MKs Ayoob Kara (Likud) and Aryeh Eldad (National Union.
- Participation together with the Movement "For Faith and Fatherland" in the organization of the round table "Neo-Sovietism as a phenomenon of our days".
- Participation jointly with the ODD "Solidarnost" in the organization of the conference "North Caucasus: Together or Apart?"
- Participation in a meeting on Bolotnaya Square on December 10, 2011.
- Banquet in honor of the 68th anniversary of the establishment of the Committee for the Liberation of the Peoples of Russia (KONR) November 14, 2012.
