= Internet censorship in Russia =

In Russia, internet censorship is enforced on the basis of several laws and through several mechanisms. Since 2008, Russia has maintained a centralized internet blacklist (known as the "single register") administered by the Federal Service for Supervision of Communications, Information Technology and Mass Media (Roskomnadzor).

The list is used for the censorship of individual URLs, domain names, and IP addresses. It was originally introduced to block sites that contain materials advocating drug abuse and drug production, descriptions of suicide methods, and child pornography. It was subsequently amended to allow the blocking of materials that are classified as extremist by including them in the Federal List of Extremist Materials. According to Freedom House, these regulations have been frequently abused to block criticism of the federal government or local administrations.

A law prohibiting "abuse of mass media freedom" implements a process for shutting down online media outlets. In March 2019, the bill, which introduced fines for those deemed by the government to be spreading "fake news" and showing "blatant disrespect" toward the state authorities, was signed into law. (Note: Individuals may face fines as much as $23,000 and/or up to 15 days' imprisonment.)

In June 2020, the European Court of Human Rights ruled against Russia in a case involving the blocking of websites critical of the government (including that of Garry Kasparov), as the plaintiffs' freedom of speech had been violated.

Following Russia's 2022 invasion of Ukraine, a rapid tightening of media controls ensued. Western media was blocked, and state-level internet filtering was implemented. Businesses advertising VPN services were banned, and foreign platforms faced heavy fines and blockages; this caused local users to shift to domestic services, mirroring China's Great Firewall ecosystem. This developing "IT curtain" is viewed as a new Iron Curtain, aiming to suppress anti-government information and consolidate state control over the public. By 2026, internet censorship had escalated to the point of widespread mobile Internet outages, VPN restrictions, and the blocking and throttling of Telegram and WhatsApp in favor of the state-controlled Max. Russia has been described as shifting towards a localized state-controlled whitelist internet model.

== Status ==
Russia was rated "partly free" in Freedom on the Net by Freedom House in 2009 (score 49), 2011 (score 52), 2012 (score 52), 2013 (score 54), and 2014 (score 60) and as "not free" in 2015 (score 62), 2016 (score 65), 2017 (score 66), and 2018 (score 67), where scores range from 0 (most free) to 100 (least free). In December 2025, Freedom House rated Russia "not free" (score 17).

In 2004, only a minority of Russians (8% of the population) had Internet access. In May 2008, some 32.7 million users in Russia had access to the Internet (almost 30% of the population). In 2012, 75.9 million Russians (53% of the population) had access. In December 2015, most of the country, 92.8 million Russians (70% of the population), had Internet access.

Russia was on Reporters Without Borders' list of countries under surveillance from 2010 to 2013 and was moved to the Internet Enemies list in 2014.

Russia was found to engage in selective Internet filtering in the political and social areas. The evidence of filtering was found in the conflict/security and Internet tools areas by the OpenNet Initiative in December 2010.

Since 2015, Russia has been collaborating with Chinese Great Firewall security officials in implementing its data retention and filtering infrastructure.

In September 2019, Roskomnadzor began installing equipment to isolate Russia, including mobile phones, from the rest of the Internet in the event the government directs such action, as required by a law taking effect in November 2019. The government's justification was to counter potential cyberattacks from the United States, but some worried it might create an online "Iron Curtain."

As of late February 2022, two of the world's leading social media platforms, Facebook and X, have been restricted in Russia by Roskomnadzor as a wartime measure amid the invasion of Ukraine. Internet rights monitor NetBlocks reported that Twitter and Facebook platforms were restricted, or throttled, across multiple providers on 26 February and 27 February, respectively, with the bans becoming near-total by 4 March.

== Agencies ==
Emblem of Roskomnadzor

Media in the Russian Federation, including the internet, is regulated by Roskomnadzor (Federal Service for Supervision in the Sphere of Telecom, Information Technologies and Mass Communications), a branch of the Ministry of Telecom and Mass Communications.

Roskomnadzor, along with several other agencies such as the Federal Drug Control Service, the Federal Consumer Protection Service, and the office of the Prosecutor General, can block certain classes of content without a court order: Calls for unsanctioned public actions, content deemed extremist, materials that violate copyright, information about juvenile victims of crime, child abuse imagery, information encouraging the use of drugs, and descriptions of suicide. Other content can be blocked with a court order.

Internet service providers (ISPs) are held legally responsible for any illegal content that is accessible to their users (intermediary liability).

== History ==
=== Internet in 2004–2012 ===
Following his visit to Russia in 2004, Álvaro Gil-Robles, then Commissioner for Human Rights of the Council of Europe, noted the high quality of news and reaction speed of Russia's Internet media. Virtually all the main newspapers were available online, some even opting for the Web as their sole information outlet. Russia's press agencies (including the most important Ria-Novosti and Itar-Tass) were also well represented on the Web.

In April 2008, Agence France-Presse noted that "The Internet is the freest area of the media in Russia, where almost all television and many newspapers are under formal or unofficial government control."

As reported by Kirill Pankratov in April 2009 in The Moscow Times:

Even discounting the chaotic nature of the web, there is plenty of Russian-language material on political and social issues that is well-written and represents a wide range of views. This does not mean, though, that most Russians are well-informed of the important political and social issues of today. But this is largely a matter of personal choice, not government restrictions. If somebody is too lazy to make just a few clicks to read and become aware of various issues and points of view, maybe he deserves to be fed bland, one-sided government propaganda.

In a November 2009 address to the Federal Assembly, then President of Russia Dmitry Medvedev acknowledged that Russia was ranked only as the world's 63rd country based on estimates of the level of communications infrastructure development. He stressed the necessity to provide broadband Internet access to the whole Russian territory in five years and to manage the transition to digital TV, as well as the 4G of cellular wireless standards.

In 2010, OpenNet Initiative noted that while "the absence of overt state-mandated Internet filtering in Russia has led some observers to conclude that the Russian Internet represents an open and uncontested space," the government had a consistent, strategic approach to taking control over the information in electronic media. 2007 cyberattacks on Estonia and cyberattacks during the Russo-Georgian War (2008) may have been "an indication of the government's active interest in mobilizing and shaping activities in Russian cyberspace."

=== Developments since 2012 ===
==== Establishment and expansion of the blacklist ====
First countrywide judicial censorship measures were taken by the government in the wake of the 2011–13 Russian protests. This included the Internet blacklist law, implemented in November 2012. The criteria for inclusion in the blacklist initially included child pornography, advocating suicide, and illegal drugs. In 2013, the blacklist law was amended with the content "suspected in extremism," "calling for illegal rallies," "inciting hatred," and "violating the established order."

The law allowed for flexible interpretation and inclusion of a wide array of content, which was frequently abused by law enforcement and administration for blanket blocking of publications criticizing state policy or describing daily problems of life in Russia.

Popular opposition websites encouraging protests against the court rulings in Bolotnaya Square case were for example blocked for "calling for illegal action"; Dumb Ways to Die, a public transport safety video, was blocked as "suicide propaganda"; websites discussing federalization of Siberia—as "attack on the foundations of the constitution"; an article on a gay activist being fired from job as well as LGBT support communities—as "propaganda of non-traditional sex relations"; publishing Pussy Riot logo—as "insult of the feelings of believers"; criticism of overspending of local governor—"insult of the authorities"; publishing a poem in support of Ukraine—"inciting hatred" etc. A separate class of materials blocked due to "extremism" includes several religious publications, mostly Muslim and Jehovah's Witnesses. Bans can be challenged in courts, and in some cases, these appeals are successful.

==== Proposals for further controls ====
In 2015, Russia's Security Council proposed a number of further Internet controls to prevent hostile "influence on the population of the country, especially young people, intended to weaken cultural and spiritual values." Prevention of this "influence" also includes active countermeasures such as actions targeted at the population and young people of the states attempting to weaken Russia's cultural values. Another initiative proposes giving Roskomnadzor the right to block any domain within the .ru TLD without a court order.

In February 2016, the business daily Vedomosti reported on a draft law by the Ministry of Telecom and Mass Communications titled "On an Autonomous Internet System." The bill calls for placing the domains .ru and .рф under government control and would make installation of the Russian state surveillance system SORM mandatory.

==== Ban on VPN and anonymizer providers ====
A ban on all software and websites related to circumventing internet filtering in Russia, including VPN software, anonymizers, and instructions on how to circumvent government website blocking, was passed in 2017.

According to data published by the Russian Society for Internet Users, founded by members of the Presidential Council for Human Rights, instances of censorship increased by a factor of 1.5 from 2013 to 2014. The incidents documented include not only instances of Internet blocking but also the use of force to shut down Internet users, such as beatings of bloggers or police raids.

=== Increase in Internet censorship from 2014 ===
Human rights NGO Agora reported that instances of Internet censorship increased ninefold from 2014 to 2015, rising from 1,019 to 9,022.

In April 2018, a Moscow court ordered the ban and blockage of the messaging app Telegram under anti-terrorism laws for refusing to cooperate with the FSB and provide access to encrypted communications. Sales of virtual private network services increased significantly in the wake of the ban.

The FSB has also started lobbying against any "external" satellite Internet access initiatives, including proposals to introduce stricter controls against satellite Internet receivers, as well as opposition against Roskosmos taking orders to bring OneWeb satellites to space.

In December 2018, Google was fined 500,000 rubles for not removing blacklisted sites from its search results.

In March 2019, legislation was passed to ban the publication of "unreliable socially significant information" and materials that show "clear disrespect" for the Russian Federation or "bodies exercising state power." Russian media freedom watchdog Roskomsvoboda reported that a number of people were charged with administrative fines for simply sharing a video about insufficient school places in Krasnodar Krai on their Facebook pages, because the video was authored by "Open Russia," which is considered an "undesirable organization" by Russian authorities. The watchdog also noted an increasing trend of law enforcement using Article 20.33 of the administrative violations code ("undesirable organizations"), which seems to be gradually replacing Article 282 of the criminal code ("extremism") as the primary censorship instrument.

==== Deep packet inspection ====
In April 2021, Roskomnadzor started enforcing throttling of Twitter traffic in Russia. The throttling was implemented with the detection of domains t.co, twimg.com, and twitter.com wrapped in wildcards. Target website domains are being detected mostly in the Server Name Indication part of the TLS handshake. The latter resulted in the throttling of all domains that contained the "t.co" substring, including microsoft.com, etc. (An example of the Scunthorpe problem.) TLS extensions that would prevent censorship using SNI, such as Encrypted SNI, were already blocked in 2020.

In July 2021, the GlobalCheck project, which monitors the actual scale and efficiency of censorship, for the first time noticed widespread use of deep packet inspection (DPI) across large mobile providers, which resulted in domains related to political activist Alexei Navalny being efficiently blocked across around 50% of Russian networks. The DPI solution, called TSPU (Russian: ТСПУ, технические средства противодействия угрозам, English: technical measures for threat protection), was introduced in 2019 legislation that also proposed isolation of the Russian segment of the Internet. The change, passed under the rationale of protecting the Russian network from external attacks, has been described by activists as actually introduced with the intention of strengthening the content censorship that has proven ineffective in many cases in the past.

The introduction of TSPU devices was associated with a number of problems experienced by players of World of Warships and other games, which were described as a side effect of the devices blocking a broad range of UDP ports.

==== Registration of instant messenger users ====
In 2021, a new regulation was passed that requires all operators of instant messaging services in Russia to establish the identity of users creating accounts in these services by means of verification of their mobile number. SIM card registration using a passport has been mandatory since the 2010s. Using public Wi-Fi also requires registration using a mobile number.

==== Blocking Tor ====
In November 2021, users in Russia started reporting issues with accessing Tor, while Roskomnadzor announced the introduction of centralized blocking of "means of circumvention" of censorship.

In December 2021, dissident authors Andrei Soldatov and Irina Borogan accused Western technology companies like Keysight Technologies, Supermicro, and Silicom of helping authorities in Moscow block Tor.

=== Full scale Internet censorship after 2022 ===
==== Gradually build a bordered network economy ====
Before the outbreak of the Ukraine conflict, Russia introduced a new Internet policy aimed at replicating an independent digital ecosystem similar to that of China, where online platforms operate largely without reliance on Western services, also incubating competitive tech giants. This progress is still not as complete as China's, but with the introduction a series of legal prosecutions and technical requirements, the freedom to access international platforms is becoming increasingly perturbing and risky. Nevertheless, this is also partly due to financial sanctions and maintenance difficulties for foreign companies. During the war, Moscow further advanced this approach by investing heavily in local enterprises (i.e., Rutube, VK, and Yandex) designed to outperform American websites' market share.

By 2022, several major Internet platforms and media had already been shut down, including Twitter and Facebook, which were fully blocked for permitting content deemed hostile toward Russians. For other widely used platforms, the government adopted a gradual strategy of imposing increasing restrictions, although it was still criticized as abrupt. For example, Discord, a communication social software that had also been used on the battlefield, was blocked on grounds of alleged child abuse, a decision opposed by pro-Russian bloggers before the introduction of a domestic replacement, and YouTube, which was initially among the few international platforms that remained widely accessible, but by 2024 it had become heavily restricted, to the point that smooth access typically required the use of a VPN, even though it had not been formally banned.

The Russian government had previously endorsed the principle of "Internet sovereignty," a concept advocated by certain authoritarian states, allowing business participation only from a limited number of allied countries. In terms of information security, Russia has deliberately distanced itself from the global network, a strategy viewed as effective in reducing vulnerability to cyberattacks.

In March 2026, the crackdown shifted from remote areas to urban centers, gradually testing the limits of public tolerance; the mobile internet was completely blocked in most parts of Moscow Central. Muscovites were unable to access banking and transport services online, and some resorted to using walkie-talkies and pagers. Some human right groups cited this as an attempt to push people towards exclusively using approved apps on the Internet Whitelist, such as the messager app Max. In response to growing public dissatisfaction, the Kremlin eventually stepped in to calm the situation, urging a balance between economic openness and information control while arguing that the measures were necessary for national security. This repeated back-and-forth appeared to be a way of easing public frustration while strengthening the regime's control, as the military operation slowed further and criticism of the authorities continued to grow.

=== Whitelisting and zero-rated services ===
In addition to blocking and filtering mechanisms implemented by Roskomnadzor, Russian authorities have also introduced forms of access control based on "whitelisting." Under these approaches, certain online services are designated for unrestricted or zero-rated access, particularly in mobile networks, while access to other resources may be limited by technical or regulatory means. Censorship has intensified rapidly and has already become even stricter than in China in 2026. However, Russia has yet to develop a fully domestic digital ecosystem, and until that happens, the ongoing cat-and-mouse game between the public and the authorities is likely to continue. This also portrays the differences between Russia's and China's internet censorship methods.

On 7 August 2025, the Russian Ministry of Digital Development said it had agreed to a technical scheme with telecom operators to provide access to a whitelist of widely used services during mobile internet restrictions. Reuters later reported that a public list of locally developed apps and services intended to remain available during shutdowns was published on 5 September 2025.

Independent researchers and volunteers have also attempted to compile and track such services using publicly available data from government announcements, telecom operators, and other sources. One example is an aggregated online catalogue that collects and updates information about such services from multiple sources. However, no single comprehensive official public registry of these services is consistently maintained.

== Monitoring ==
=== SORM system ===
Russia's System of Operational-Investigatory Measures (SORM) requires telecommunications operators to install hardware provided by the Federal Security Service (FSB). It allows the agency to unilaterally monitor users' communications metadata and content, including phone calls, email traffic, and web browsing activity. Metadata can be obtained without a warrant. In 2014, the system was expanded to include social media platforms, and the Ministry of Communications ordered companies to install new equipment with deep packet inspection (DPI) capability.

=== Data sovereignty ===
The "Bloggers law" (passed July 2014) is an amendment to existing anti-terrorism legislation, which includes data localization and data retention provisions. Among other changes, it requires all web services to store the user data of Russian citizens on servers within the country. Sites that did not comply with this requirement by September 2016 may be added to the internet blacklist. Since August 2014, the law requires operators of free Wi-Fi hotspots (e.g., in restaurants, libraries, cafes, etc.) to collect personal details of all users, identify them using passports, and store the data.

The "Yarovaya law" (passed July 2016) is a package of several legislative amendments that include extensions to data retention. Among other changes, it requires telecom operators to store recordings of phone conversations, text messages, and users' internet traffic for up to 6 months, as well as metadata for up to 3 years. This data, as well as "all other information necessary," is available to authorities on request and without a court order.

As of January 2018, companies registered in Russia as "organizers of information dissemination," such as online messaging applications, will not be permitted to allow unidentified users.

== Mass media ==
On Mass Media
- Long title: Federal Law No. 2121-1, "On Mass Media"
- Citation: 2121-1
- Passed: 27 December 1991

The federal telecommunications regulator Roskomnadzor can issue warnings to the editorial board of mass media and websites registered as mass media concerning "abuse of mass media freedom." According to the "Law on Mass Media," such abuse can include "extremist" content, information on recreational drug use, and the propagation of cruelty and violence, as well as obscene language.

If a media outlet receives two warnings within a year, Roskomnadzor can request a court order shutting down the media outlet entirely.

== Internet blacklist ==
Internet censorship in Russia
- Long title: On Amending Federal Law "On the Protection of Children from Information Harmful to Their Health and Development and Other Legislative Acts of the Russian Federation"
- Citation: 139-FZ
- Passed: 11 July 2012
- Commenced: 1 November 2012

Summary
- Implements a central Internet blacklist ("single register")

=== Legislation ===
In July 2012, Russia's State Duma passed a law requiring the establishment of an Internet blacklist. The law took effect on 1 November 2012. The blacklist is administered by the Federal Service for Supervision of Communications, Information Technology and Mass Media (Roskomnadzor) and the Federal Drug Control Service of Russia.

Internet censorship in Russia
- Long title: On Amending Federal Law "On Information, Information Technologies and Information Protection"
- Citation: 398-FZ
- Passed: 20 December 2013

Summary
- Allows additional categories of content to be blocked without a court order

At the time of introduction the list was described as a means for the protection of children from harmful content, particularly content that glorifies drug usage, advocates suicide or describes suicide methods, or contains child pornography. In 2013 legislative amendments allowed the blocking of content "suspected in extremism," "calling for illegal meetings," "inciting hatred," and any other actions "violating the established order." This content can be blocked without a court order by the office of the Prosecutor General.

Internet censorship in Russia
- Long title: On Amending Federal Law "On Information, Information Technologies and Information Protection"
- Citation: 276-FZ
- Passed: 21 July 2017
- Enacted: 29 July 2017
- Commenced: 1 November 2017
- Bill citation: 195446-7

Summary
- Bans all software and websites related to circumventing internet filtering in Russia

In July 2017, Vladimir Putin signed a bill, which took effect 1 November 2017, which bans all software and websites related to circumventing internet filtering in Russia, including anonymizers and virtual private network (VPN) services that do not implement the blacklist, and instructional material on how to do so.

A number of individual instances of censorship were taken by Russian citizens to the European Court of Human Rights (Vladimir Kharitonov v. Russia, OOO Flavus and Others v. Russia, and Engels v. Russia), and in 2020 ruled that actions of Russian law enforcement in these cases were in clear violation of articles 10 and 13 of the European Convention on Human Rights.

=== Implementation ===
The implementation of the blacklist is outlined in a government decree issued in October 2012.

Roskomnadzor offers a website where users can check to see whether a given URL or IP address is in the blacklist and can also report websites that contain prohibited materials to the authorities. After a submission is verified, Roskomnadzor will inform the website's owner and hosting provider. If the material is not removed within three days, the website will be added to the blacklist, and all Russian ISPs must block it. The full content of the blacklist initially was not available to the general public, although soon after it was implemented, a leaked list of blacklisted websites was published by a LiveJournal user on 12 November 2012.

The searchable blacklist interface was made available as a full list by activists. As of July 2017, it includes over 70,000 entries.

=== Reaction ===
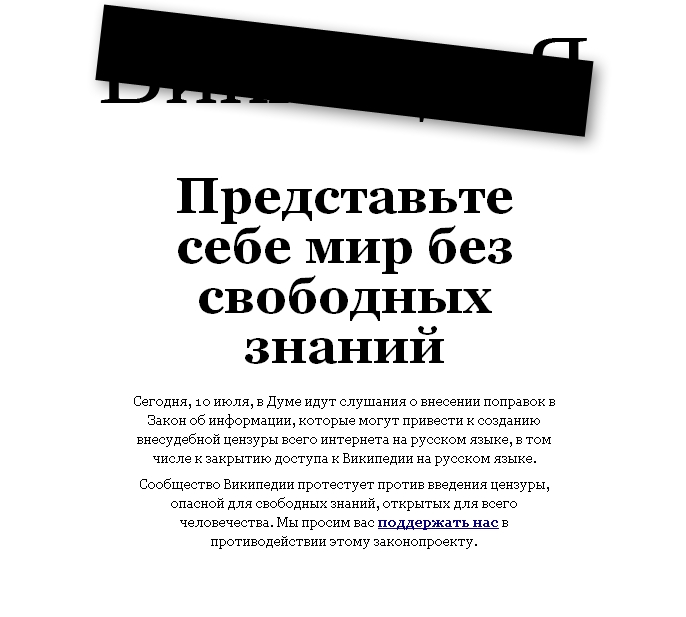
Russian Wikipedia during its 2012 protest against the blacklist

Reporters Without Borders criticized the procedure by which entries are added to the blacklist as "extremely opaque" and viewed it as part of an attack on the freedom of information in Russia. In 2012, when the banned content only included child pornography, drugs, and suicide, the human rights activists expressed fear that the blacklist may be used to censor democracy-oriented websites (which indeed happened the next year). And a Lenta.ru editorial noted that the criteria for prohibited content are so broad that even the website of the ruling United Russia party could, in theory, be blacklisted. However, the idea was at that time generally supported by the Russian public: in a September 2012 Levada Center survey, 63% of respondents had expressed support for "Internet censorship", though any kind of censorship is banned under the Constitution of Russia.

The Electronic Frontier Foundation has criticized the blacklist, stating, "EFF is profoundly opposed to government censorship of the Internet, which violates its citizens' right to freedom of expression... We are especially concerned about the censorship of independent news and opposing political views, which are essential to a thriving civil society. Russians who wish to circumvent government censorship can continue to read these websites via the Tor Browser."

== Instances of censorship ==
A number of websites maintain lists of websites currently blocked in Russia, based on different sources of information. You can check the availability of a website in Russia using special services.

=== George Soros blocked ===
President Vladimir Putin signed the law in late 2013 about the procedure for the Prosecutor General of Russia and the Prosecutor General's Office to decide which websites may be blocked arbitrarily. Then the Russian government passed the law about undesirable organizations in 2015, after which all suspected 'undesirable organizations' websites could also be arbitrarily blocked by the Prosecutor General's Office. After that, the 'undesirable' websites of philanthropist George Soros and a number of others were blocked in Russia.

=== The German Marshall Fund ===
The Russian government announced that the website of a US-based think tank, The German Marshall Fund, was to be blocked on March 11, 2018, without any explanation. In total, 22 undesirable organizations were blocked between 2015 and 2020, including Open Russia, the National Endowment for Democracy, the Open Society Foundations, the U.S. Russia Foundation for Economic Advancement and the Rule of Law, Germany's European Platform for Democratic Elections, Lithuania's International Elections Study Center, the Atlantic Council and the like.

=== Smart Voting ===
In September 2021, ahead of the State Duma elections, several actions were taken to suppress Alexei Navalny's Smart Voting website and mobile app, which promoted opposition candidates in the election.

A trademark on "Smart Voting" was secured by an agricultural company, Woolintertrade, which successfully received an injunction against Google and Yandex, requiring them to censor queries for the string.

Roskomnadzor intensified use of TSPUs in what was interpreted as an attempt to suppress use of the website, including attempts to throttle IP addresses associated with Google services such as Google App Engine, and added Smart Voting's URLs to its blacklist as "extremist" materials, as they were classified as a continuation of the operations of the "extremist" Anti-Corruption Foundation. The targeting of Google Public DNS led to severe connectivity problems with various services, including the Central Bank of Russia.

Roskomnadzor ordered Apple and Google to remove Smart Voting-related materials from their platforms, threatening the companies with fines for election interference. The companies complied with the order, which also included a brief block of Google Docs when Navalny published Smart Voting materials on the platform and the removal of videos containing the material on YouTube. Messaging service Telegram censored a chatbot tied to Smart Voting from its platform, stating that it was required to comply in order to comply with the terms of service of Apple and Google's app stores.

=== Russian invasion of Ukraine ===
ISP page users are redirected to after trying to visit the BBC's website.

Internet censorship in Russia intensified in late February 2022 amid the country's invasion of Ukraine, due to Roskomnadzor orders and federal laws prohibiting the dissemination of dissent and "knowingly false" information regarding the Russian military—which includes any materials and reporting that does not align with official government information and statements. These orders have applied primarily to foreign (such as BBC News, Deutsche Welle, RFE/RL, Voice of America, and the Ukraine Ministry of Internal Affairs-run Look for Your Own) and independent (such as Current Time TV, Interfax, and Meduza) media outlets. Facebook and Twitter were also ordered blocked in retaliation for their censorship of state-owned media outlets such as RT and Sputnik.

On 11 March 2022, Belarusian political police GUBOPiK arrested and detained Mark Bernstein, a Minsk-based Russian Wikipedia editor who was editing the article about the invasion, accusing him of the "spread of anti-Russian materials" and of violating the Russian "fake news" law.

In April–July 2022, the Russian authorities put several Wikipedia articles on their list of forbidden sites, and then ordered search engines to mark Wikipedia as a violator of Russian laws.

Russian authorities have blocked or removed about 138,000 websites since Russia began its invasion of Ukraine in February 2022.

==== Declaration of Meta Platforms as extremist ====
In March 2022, Meta Platforms—owner of social networks Facebook and Instagram and messaging service WhatsApp—adopted an exception to its moderation policy that would allow users in twelve countries, including Ukraine and Russia, to make certain posts within the context of the Russo-Ukrainian war that would normally be prohibited under its content rules. These exceptions included praise of the Azov Brigade and calls for violence towards Russian soldiers and/or the presidents of Russia and Belarus.

The policy change was met with criticism from Russian officials; Russia's embassy in the United States described it as an "aggressive and criminal policy leading to incitement of hatred and hostility towards Russians" and as "extremist activities." On 11 March 2022, it was reported that Russian authorities had opened a criminal case against Meta Platforms, seeking its declaration as an "extremist organization" for facilitating calls for violence and murder towards Russian citizens. Instagram was concurrently blocked by Roskomnadzor; Facebook had already been blocked for suppressing access to state media outlets. Meta's president of global affairs Nick Clegg stated that the change was intended to "protect people's rights to speech as an expression of self-defense in reaction to a military invasion of their country."

On 13 March 2022, Clegg issued an internal memo intending to clarify the policy change, stating that it was "never to be interpreted as condoning violence against Russians in general" and that "we also do not permit calls to assassinate a head of state." On 21 March 2022, the Tverskoi District Court found Meta Platforms guilty of facilitating extremist activity on Facebook and Instagram. Roskomnadzor removed Facebook and Instagram from the registries of social networks and foreign internet companies allowed to operate in Russia, requires media outlets to refer to the platforms as prohibited when acknowledged, and forbids display of the services' logos. The order did not apply to WhatsApp, as it was considered a "means of communication, not a source of information," and it was initially stated that there were no plans to target those who use VPN services to evade the block. Meta was added to Russia's list of organizations considered "extremist" in October 2022. In April 2024, a Russian military court sentenced Meta communications director Andy Stone in absentia to six years in prison for facilitating terrorism.

=== Throttling of Microsoft and Zoom ===
On 26 May 2025, Vladimir Putin said that foreign services like Microsoft and Zoom should be throttled, claiming that the services act against Russian interests and that it is important for Russia to develop domestic software solutions.

=== Russian law against extremist content ===
On 22 July 2025, Russian lawmakers voted and passed legislation that criminalizes "searching for extremist content online." The legislation marks the first time Moscow will hit internet users for consuming (rather than distributing) materials deemed as banned in a further crackdown on dissent. The Russian extremist register contains 5,473 entries and is maintained by the Ministry of Justice. The listing stretches for over 500 pages. Individuals will face fines between 3,000 and 5,000 rubles for violations of the law. First-time offenders will be fined up to approximately $64 USD. The bill passed the lower house, the State Duma, and was sent to the upper house on 22 July. Based on reporting from Telegram channels Ostorozhno and Novosti, the amendments were supported by 306 deputies, with 67 voting against and 22 abstaining.

The law also targets individuals who use virtual private networks (VPN) to bypass censorship to access banned content. Advertising VPN services carries fines of 50,000–80,000 rubles ($640–$1,020) for individuals, 80,000–150,000 rubles ($1,020–$1,900) for officials, and 200,000–500,000 rubles ($2,550–$6,380) for legal entities. The legislature also adopted a provision designating the use of VPNs in the commission of a crime as an aggravating factor.

== See also ==
- Censorship of GitHub in Russia
- Sovereign Internet Law
- Internet in Russia
- Mass surveillance in Russia
- Media freedom in Russia
- Political repression of cyber-dissidents
