= Mass surveillance in Russia =

Mass surveillance is the pervasive surveillance of an entire or a substantial fraction of a population. Mass surveillance in Russia includes surveillance, open-source intelligence and data mining, lawful interception as well as telecommunications data retention.

Key systems include the SORM lawful interception network, which gives the Federal Security Service (FSB) direct access to communications, and deep packet inspection equipment installed on every internet provider. Cities operate camera networks with facial recognition, and the state maintains centralised registries of biometric, travel and conscription data. Retention laws oblige telecom operators and internet platforms to store users' communications and disclose them to the authorities. Following the invasion of Ukraine in 2022, these systems were increasingly turned against anti-war protesters, draft evaders and other critics of the government, and were extended to occupied Ukrainian territories.

== Interception of communications ==
=== SORM ===
Russia's System of Operational-Investigatory Measures (SORM) requires telecommunications operators to install hardware provided by the Federal Security Service (FSB) which allows the agency to monitor users' communications metadata and content, including phone calls, email traffic, and web browsing activity. The SORM-1 system captures telephone and mobile phone communications, SORM-2 intercepts Internet traffic, and SORM-3 collects information from all forms of communication, providing long-term storage of all information and data on subscribers, including actual recordings and locations. In 2012, SORM-2 was expanded to include social media platforms, and in 2014 the Ministry of Communications ordered companies to install new equipment with deep packet inspection (DPI) capability. In 2016, SORM-3 added additional classified regulations that apply to all Internet service providers in Russia. Since 2019, a separate state-supplied DPI network known as TSPU ("technical means for countering threats"), installed on providers' networks under the Sovereign Internet Law and controlled by Roskomnadzor, has given the state an additional traffic inspection layer that researchers found to operate independently of the ISPs hosting it.

The FSB is required to obtain a post-collection court warrant to access these records. Surveillance can begin before the warrant is granted or requested, the warrant need not be shown to the telecom operator, and it is only required for the retrieval of collected communications content, not for the metadata. According to figures from the judicial department of Russia's Supreme Court, courts received 4,659,325 requests for the interception of phone calls and correspondence between 2007 and 2015 and granted 4,517,515 of them, about 97 percent, with the number of requests growing every year. The European Court for Human Rights deemed Russia's SORM legislation in breach of the European Convention on Human Rights in 2015 (Zakharov v. Russia), pointing to defects in the law that allowed communications to be intercepted without prior judicial authorisation.

Intercepted communications have repeatedly leaked to pro-government media. In December 2011 the LifeNews portal published dozens of recorded phone calls of the opposition politician Boris Nemtsov, and in 2012 Komsomolskaya Pravda published a recording in which a voice resembling that of the protest leader Sergei Udaltsov discusses paying participants for opposition rallies.

=== Equipment suppliers ===
SORM's technical framework goes back to systems developed by the Soviet KGB in the late 1980s, and the equipment has been exported: implementations produced by Russian firms such as MFI Soft have been deployed across post-Soviet Central Asia. A 2022 investigation by The New York Times, based on internal company documents, found that Nokia had for more than five years supplied equipment and services connecting SORM to MTS, Russia's largest telecom operator. Much of the SORM equipment market has been consolidated by the Citadel Group, once partially controlled by the businessman Alisher Usmanov, which according to the US State Department controls about 60 to 80 percent of the market for telecommunications monitoring technology; the United States sanctioned Citadel and its owner in February 2023. Software made by its subsidiary MFI Soft presents subscriber data to FSB officers and can map the locations of phones to detect meetings, spot a person carrying several phones, and identify file transfers through deep packet inspection.

=== Encryption ===
Under the 2016 Yarovaya Law amendments, services registered as "organizers of information dissemination" must give the security services the information needed to decode users' electronic messages, and in 2019 the FSB required registered internet services to install equipment giving it around-the-clock access to their systems and decryption keys, without judicial oversight. When Telegram refused a 2017 FSB demand for the keys to its users' correspondence, it was fined and ordered blocked; the blocking attempt in 2018 rendered almost 16 million IP addresses inaccessible while leaving Telegram broadly reachable, and was abandoned in 2020. The underlying FSB order, which sought to decrypt the end-to-end encrypted "secret chats" of six users, reached the European Court of Human Rights: in Podchasov v. Russia (February 2024) the court ruled unanimously that Russia's data retention regime and its decryption requirement violate Article 8 of the European Convention, holding that legislation obliging a provider to weaken encryption for all users impairs the very essence of the right to private life.

The authorities have also sought to restrict encryption technologies that prevent monitoring equipment from identifying which websites users visit. In September 2020 the Ministry of Digital Development published a draft law to ban protocols that conceal the name of a requested website, naming TLS 1.3 with ESNI, DNS over HTTPS and DNS over TLS, on the grounds that they reduce the effectiveness of the state's filtering systems; in November 2024, TSPU equipment began blocking connections that use the Encrypted Client Hello extension, making thousands of websites served through Cloudflare inaccessible. The Tor network and website were blocked from December 2021, when Russia had more than 300,000 daily Tor users, encrypted email and messaging services including ProtonMail, Tutanota, Signal, Discord and Viber were blocked between 2020 and 2024, and in July 2024 Apple removed about 25 VPN applications from its Russian App Store at Roskomnadzor's demand.

=== 2014 Winter Olympics ===
Citing threats from Islamist insurgents and the host city's proximity to Georgia, the Russian government applied comprehensive screening measures during the 2014 Sochi Winter Olympics. It was reported to have served as a testing ground for comprehensive and invasive surveillance, reportedly making Sochi the most policed environment in history. The FSB arranged classified upgrades to SORM equipment in Sochi before the event, and all communication and Internet traffic of Sochi residents was captured and filtered through deep packet inspection systems at all mobile networks, an arrangement one analyst described as a "giant vacuum cleaner which scoops all electronic transmissions from all users all the time". Roskomnadzor reported that several local ISPs were fined after failing to install FSB-recommended SORM devices. Aside from security perimeters staffed by the police, the government installed 5,500 CCTV cameras to monitor the surrounding countryside.

== Open-source monitoring ==
The FSB and Interior Ministry monitor open sources and the Internet, including the blogosphere and social networks, with an analytical system called "Semantic Archive", made by the Russian firm Analytic Business Solutions and also used elsewhere in the Commonwealth of Independent States; the system aggregates material from media, blogs, forums, social networks and internal databases, extracts persons, events and relationships, and assembles dossiers with visualised connection charts.

In February 2023, Roskomnadzor was reported to have launched "Oculus", an automated image-scanning system operated by its subsidiary, the General Radio Frequency Center, capable of scanning up to 200,000 images a day for prohibited content, including images of protesters, "positive depictions" of LGBT culture and memes criticising President Vladimir Putin. Leaked documents from the same agency, analysed by Mediazona, describe a commissioned system called "Vepr" intended to monitor and predict "information tension points" online.

Monitoring of social networks has resulted in large numbers of prosecutions. A Novaya Gazeta Europe study of court data from 2010 through October 2024 counted more than 30,000 criminal and administrative cases over social media posts, shares and likes, including around 1,200 criminal cases; 896 administrative cases were brought over private direct messages, and the VKontakte platform accounted for almost 80 percent of administrative cases.

Legislation has also extended monitoring to users' search queries. A law adopted in July 2025 imposed fines on citizens for "intentionally" searching online for content designated "extremist", including through VPNs, together with fines for advertising VPN services; it took effect that September. The first known case followed in November 2025, when a 20-year-old from Sverdlovsk Oblast was reported to the FSB by his own internet provider after allegedly viewing information about Ukrainian military units.

== Movement tracking ==
A passport has been required to buy a train ticket since 2001, a plane ticket since 2004, and an interregional bus ticket since 2012. Since 2000 the Interior Ministry has checked passenger records against a database called Rozysk-Magistral, which covers people wanted by Interpol, foreigners suspected of crimes in Russia, Russians suspected of offences such as murder, terrorism and trafficking in ammunition or antiques, and leaders of criminal groups. In 2005 the database gained a section known as Storozhevoi Kontrol ("sentry control") listing "potential extremists"; estimates of its size range from 3,800 to 6,500 names. Police used the system in 2007 and 2008 to take the human rights activist Sergei Shimovolos off trains and search him, suspecting that he was travelling to opposition events. Ruling on his complaint in 2011, the European Court of Human Rights found that the operation of Storozhevoi Kontrol, which offered no minimal safeguards against abuse, fell short of the standards of legality, and that Shimovolos's registration in it violated Article 8 of the European Convention on Human Rights.

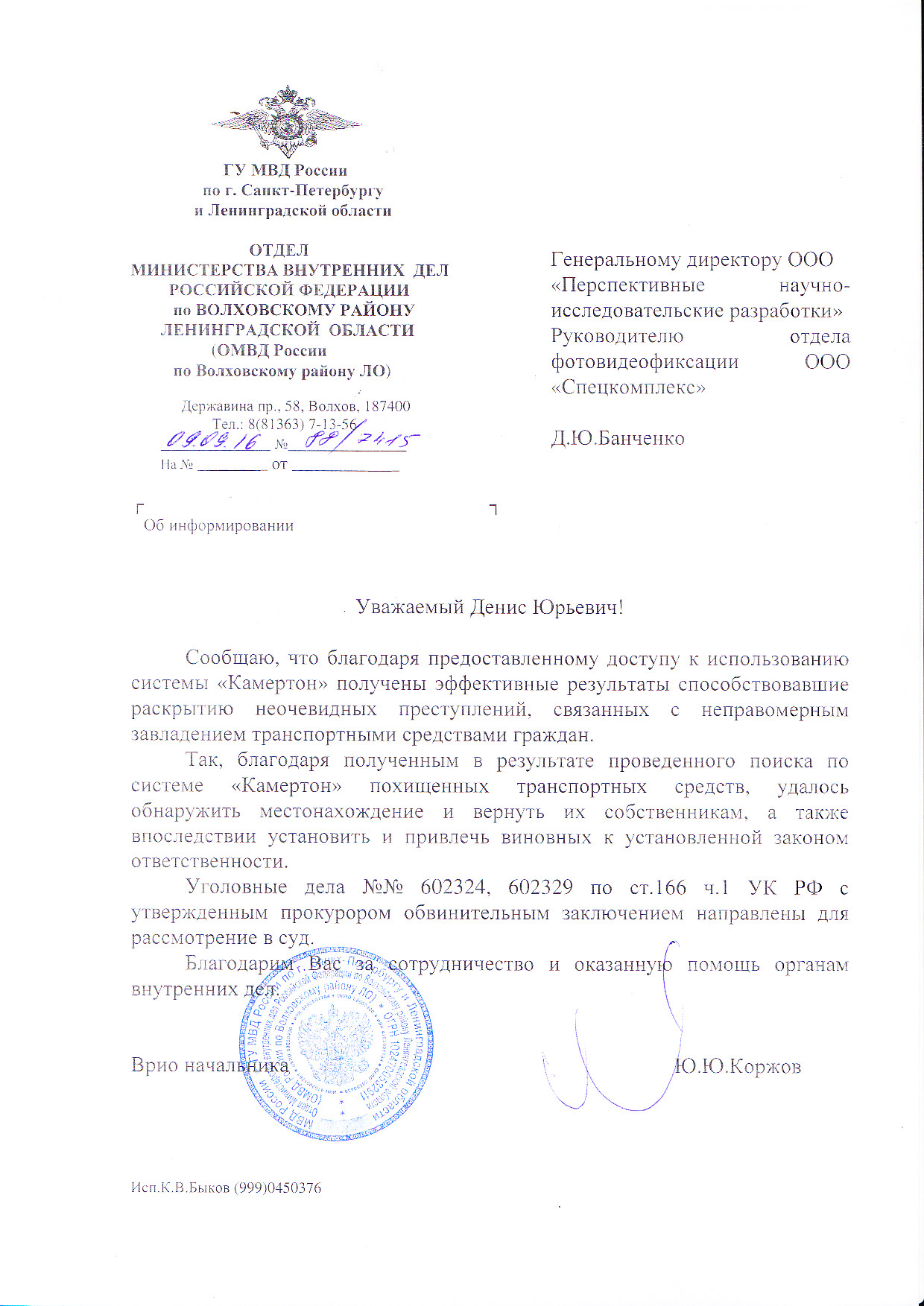
Gratitude of the Department of the Ministry of Internal Affairs of the Russian Federation for the Volkhov region of the organization Perspective Scientific Research Development for the creation of the "CAMERTON" system

Road traffic is tracked by CAMERTON, a vehicle-tracking system that identifies probable routes and the places where a given vehicle most often appears, drawing on a distributed network of road-surveillance cameras and radar complexes with photo and video capture. It was developed by the St. Petersburg company Advanced Scientific Research Projects and is used by the Interior Ministry and other state agencies.

Under a taxi law adopted in December 2022 and in force since 1 September 2023, ride-hailing services must give the FSB permanent remote access to the databases in which they process passenger orders, store travel data for six months, and keep their cooperation with the agency secret.

== Video surveillance and facial recognition ==
Covert filming has been used against opposition politicians. In February 2012 a hidden-camera video of the private life of Vladimir Ryzhkov was circulated online, and in March 2016 the NTV channel broadcast similar footage of Mikhail Kasyanov.

Russian facial recognition first drew wide attention in 2016 with FindFace, an app that let users identify strangers by matching photographs against VKontakte profile pictures with a claimed 70 percent accuracy; it gained half a million users within about two months. After a public backlash the app was withdrawn and its developer, NtechLab, turned to state and business clients; by late 2019 NtechLab and VisionLabs, part-owned by Rostec and Sberbank respectively, were the country's leading facial recognition suppliers, and Moscow had tendered for recognition software on up to 200,000 cameras.

By late 2019 about 160,000 cameras were installed in Moscow, with a facial recognition system connected to some 3,000 of them. The first reported abuse of the system dates to 2018, when Mikhail Aksel, an activist of The Other Russia party, was detained at a Moscow metro station after a camera matched his face against a wanted-persons database. An officer of the Centre for Combating Extremism had entered him into the database even though he was not wanted for any crime; Aksel was released, but police told him the record could not be removed. Moscow courts ruled in 2019 that data collected by the system are not personal data and in 2020 that the system does not violate privacy, dismissing a case brought by the activist Alyona Popova and the politician Vladimir Milov, who then took their complaint to the European Court of Human Rights in the court's first case over facial recognition mass surveillance. Facial recognition was used to identify and detain people who had attended protests in support of the opposition politician Alexei Navalny in 2021.

After the invasion of Ukraine, the authorities regularly used the system to identify and detain protesters and other critics. On Russia Day, 12 June 2022, at least 67 people were detained in Moscow according to the monitoring group OVD-Info, 43 of them stopped in the metro through facial recognition. A Reuters investigation based on a review of more than 2,000 court cases found that at least 141 people were detained preventively in Moscow in 2022 with the help of facial recognition, typically stopped in metro stations before planned protests or events; many detainees said officials referred to a system called "Sfera" (Sphere), and the metro has deployed algorithms from the Russian firms Tevian, NtechLab and VisionLabs. During the autumn 2022 mobilization, Human Rights Watch reported that at least seven men were detained in Moscow within about a month after the facial recognition system flagged them to police as draft evaders. After Alexei Navalny's funeral in March 2024, police arrested attendees identified from surveillance camera footage; OVD-Info noted that the Moscow system allows the authorities to trace each attendee's route home.

Camera networks have continued to expand. In June 2022 the Emergencies Ministry sought 15 billion rubles ($265 million) to extend the "Safe City" surveillance programme, overseen by the state conglomerate Rostec, to annexed Crimea and the Krasnodar, Voronezh and Belgorod regions bordering Ukraine. Moscow's budget for 2024 more than doubled spending on video surveillance equipment to 1.97 billion rubles ($22.2 million), and official data showed more than half a million cameras connected to facial recognition systems across Russia. In 2025 St. Petersburg authorities moved to fit about 8,000 of the city's cameras with ethnicity recognition software under its Safe City programme, a plan that the head of the presidential Human Rights Council called degrading to human dignity.

=== Schools and universities ===
In June 2020 it was reported that contracts worth more than 2 billion rubles ($29 million) had been signed to install school camera systems capable of facial recognition under the name "Orwell", after the author of Nineteen Eighty-Four; systems had been delivered to 1,608 schools by a subsidiary of Rostec. The 2022–2024 federal budget set aside over 1.6 billion rubles for a system analysing schoolchildren's and students' written work to identify those "prone to socially dangerous and destructive behaviour", and in 2021 the Russian State Humanitarian University issued a tender for software to monitor its students' internet activity around the clock for signs of protest sentiment.

== Biometric databases ==
The state's Unified Biometric System, created in 2018 and operated by Rostelecom, collects facial images and voice samples and is accessible to police and intelligence services. In May 2022 the authorities directed at least four major state-owned banks, including VTB, to share their clients' biometric data with the system. A law adopted in July 2022 obliged banks and state agencies to enter clients' biometrics into the central database without requiring their consent, reversing the previous requirement of individual consent for the collection of biometrics. A framework law adopted in December 2022 limited state collection to face and voice biometrics and formally banned forced collection, allowing citizens to refuse in writing. Since the start of 2025, foreigners in Russia can only sign mobile phone contracts after submitting biometric data to the system, and existing numbers of those who failed to register by July 2025 face staged disconnection; the Digital Development Ministry said more than two million foreign nationals had registered under the new rules.

A related registry covers conscription. In April 2023 the State Duma passed a law legalising electronic military summonses served through the Gosuslugi portal and creating a unified register of draft-eligible citizens fed by tax, medical, pension and other state databases; a summons is considered served as soon as it appears in the register, triggers an immediate ban on leaving the country, and failure to report within 20 days brings bans on driving, real estate deals and loans. The autumn 2025 draft campaign was the first to use exclusively digital summonses in Moscow and three other regions, with restrictions imposed automatically on those who fail to report.

== Data retention and identification ==
=== Bloggers law ===
"Bloggers Law"
- Long title: On Amending Federal Law “On Information, Information Technologies and Protection of Information” and Other Legislative Acts of the Russian Federation Concerning Putting in Order Information Exchange Using Information and Telecommunication Networks
- Citation: 97-FZ
- Passed: 5 May 2014

A 2014 law dubbed "Bloggers law" includes data retention provisions. According to the law, bloggers with over 3,000 daily readers are required to register and can no longer remain anonymous online. Organizations that provide platforms for their work such as search engines, social networks, and other forums must maintain computer records on Russian soil of everything posted over the previous six months. Major services required to comply include Facebook, Skype, and Gmail.

=== Data localization ===
Since September 2015, Federal Law No. 242-FZ has required operators of websites and services, foreign and domestic, to store and process Russian citizens' personal data on servers inside Russia. LinkedIn, with about five million Russian users, became the first major social network blocked for non-compliance in November 2016, and Moscow courts have repeatedly fined Facebook, Twitter and WhatsApp for refusing to move Russians' data onto Russian territory. Human Rights Watch has linked localization directly to state access to data, as the Yarovaya amendments built on it by obliging companies to store communications content in Russia and disclose it on demand. A 2021 "landing law" additionally obliged foreign internet companies with more than half a million daily Russian users to open local offices, on pain of penalties up to full blocking.

=== Yarovaya law ===
In July 2016, President Vladimir Putin signed into law two sets of legislative amendments commonly referred to as the Yarovaya Law after their key author, Irina Yarovaya. Under the amendments, internet and telecom companies are required to store communications and metadata for six months to three years. They are required to disclose them, as well as "all other information necessary," to authorities on request and without a court order. It also requires email and messaging service providers to install cryptographic backdoors. The surveillance provisions took effect on 1 July 2018.

=== Identification requirements ===
Operators of public Wi-Fi networks (restaurants, libraries, cafes etc.) are legally required to identify all users by their passports and store the data for at least six months. All VPN software and anonymizers that do not implement Russia's internet blacklist are banned as of November 2017, and "organizers of information dissemination" that allow unidentified users are banned as of January 2018. Messaging services, email and social networks that use encrypted data are required to permit the FSB to access and read their encrypted communications without a court order starting in July 2018.

== State messenger ==
Amid restrictions on WhatsApp and Telegram calls from August 2025, and WhatsApp's accusation in early 2026 that the government sought to block it entirely, the state has promoted MAX, a messenger developed by VK and launched in March 2025, which became mandatory to preinstall on all smartphones, tablets, computers and smart TVs sold in Russia from 1 September 2025. An independent analysis found the app collects IP addresses, geolocation and contact lists, with a privacy policy permitting data sharing with government bodies. President Putin endorsed the app and ordered government services transferred to it; by December 2025, parts of the Gosuslugi e-government portal required MAX, and universities reportedly threatened students for not installing it. A technical analysis published in May 2026 found that MAX collected a list of every application installed on the device, checked for VPNs, allowed TLS session validation to be disabled by server command, and contained a speech recognition neural network able to identify speakers and transcribe conversations, with recordings stored unencrypted; the speech recognition components were removed in an update days before the analysis was published.

== Use against wartime dissent ==
Laws signed in March 2022 introduced prison terms of up to 15 years for spreading "fake news" about the Russian army. By August 2024 more than 10,000 cases had been opened for "discrediting" the army, according to a count by Mediazona, and 692 people faced criminal prosecution for "false information" about or "discreditation" of the army through September 2025, out of at least 1,299 prosecuted for opposing the war. Some prosecutions have drawn directly on intercepted communications. In April 2023 a Moscow court sentenced Sergei Vedel, a former police officer born near Kyiv, to seven years in prison over private telephone conversations about the war; he was arrested after his call with a Ukrainian police officer was wiretapped. Other cases have arisen from denunciations. In November 2024 the Moscow paediatrician Nadezhda Buyanova was sentenced to five and a half years after a patient's mother reported remarks she allegedly made during an appointment; no recording of the conversation existed. In February 2025 the European Court of Human Rights, ruling in a case brought by 180 applicants including Novaya Gazeta, found that the wartime censorship laws revealed "a coordinated effort to suppress dissent"; Russia has not complied with the court's rulings since withdrawing from its jurisdiction in 2022.

Russian authorities have also extended surveillance practices to the occupied territories of Ukraine. Human Rights Watch documented that during "filtration" screening in spring 2022, Russian and Russian-affiliated personnel ordered civilians to hand over and unlock their phones, in some cases copying their data, and collected fingerprints and facial photographs without consent to populate a police database. By August 2022 occupation authorities had rerouted internet and mobile traffic in the Kherson region through Russian networks, switched off Ukrainian cellular networks, and required a passport to buy a Russian SIM card. This placed the occupied areas within Russia's censorship and surveillance system.

== Probiv data market ==
Personal data from Russian government and corporate databases is bought and sold through probiv, an illicit black market that draws on the state's surveillance and registration systems. The market operates through networks of corrupt officials from police, telecommunications companies, banks, and security services who sell access to restricted databases for fees as low as $10. While Russians formally consent to the collection of their personal data and can revoke that consent under the personal data law, collected databases regularly end up in the open through weak protection, hacking, or insider employees.

According to The Guardian, Russian law enforcement officers themselves use probiv to track activists and opposition figures because it offers more convenient access than official departmental databases. Surveillance data enters the probiv market and can be purchased through Telegram bots. Since the invasion of Ukraine, Ukrainian intelligence services have exploited probiv to identify Russian military officials operating inside Russia.

== See also ==
- Human rights in Russia
