= NMIC =

NMIC may refer to:

- National Maritime Intelligence Center
- National Minerals Information Center
- Network Monitoring Interface Card
- Not Made In China
