= Tsesis =

Tsesis may refer to:

- Alexander Tsesis, American constitutional scholar
- Cēsis, town in Latvia
