= Memory law =

Legal provision governing interpretation of historical events

A memory law (transl. Erinnerungsgesetz in German, transl. loi mémorielle in French) is a legal provision governing the interpretation of historical events and showcases the legislator's or judicial preference for a certain narrative about the past. In the process, competing interpretations may be downplayed, sidelined, or even prohibited.

Various types of memory laws exist, in particular, in countries that allow for the introduction of limitations to the freedom of expression to protect other values, such as the democratic character of the state, the rights and reputation of others, and historical truth.

Uladzislau Belavusau and Aleksandra Gliszczyńska-Grabias define memory laws as "enshrine[ing] state-approved interpretations of historical events."

Eric Heinze argues that law can work equally powerfully through legislation that makes no express reference to history, for example, when journalists, academics, students, or other citizens face personal or professional hardship for dissenting from official histories.

Memory laws can be either punitive or non-punitive. A non-punitive memory law does not imply a criminal sanction. It has a declaratory or confirmatory character. Regardless, such a law may lead to imposing a dominant interpretation of the past and exercise a chilling effect on those who challenge the official interpretation. A punitive memory law includes a sanction, often of a criminal nature. Nikolai Koposov refers to "memory laws per se" as "laws criminalizing certain statements about the past."

Memory laws often lead to censorship. Even without a criminal sanction, memory laws may still produce a chilling effect and limit free expression on historical topics, especially among historians and other researchers.

Memory laws exist as both ‘hard' law and ‘soft' law instruments. An example of a hard law is a criminal ban on the denial and gross trivialization of a genocide or crime against humanity. A soft law is an informal rule that incentivizes states or individuals to act in a certain way. For example, a European Parliament resolution on the European conscience and totalitarianism (CDL-AD(2013)004) expresses strong condemnation for all totalitarian and undemocratic regimes and invites EU citizens, that is, citizens of all member states of the European Union, to commemorate victims of the two twentieth century totalitarianisms, Nazism and communism.

== History ==
The term "loi mémorielle" (memory law) originally appeared in December 2005, in Françoise Chandernagor article in Le Monde magazine. Chandernagor protested about the increasing number of laws enacted with the intention of "forc(ing) on historians the lens through which to consider the past". She referred to the 1990 Loi Gayssot introduced to the French Act on the Freedom of the Press a prohibition on the "contestation" of crimes against humanity, as defined by the Charter of the International Military Tribunal as well as to "loi Arménie" adopted in 2001, that recognized the Armenian genocide, the "loi Taubira" from 2001, recognizing slavery and the transatlantic slave trade as a crime against humanity and the "loi Rapatrié" from 2005, which required French schools to teach the positive aspects of French presence on the colonies, in particular in North Africa.

Scholars of memory laws have pointed to the proliferation and promulgation of memory laws in the past decade within the member states of the Council of Europe and well beyond.

The headings of "memory law" or "historical memory law" have been applied to diverse regulations adopted around the world. For example, both journalists and academic scholars used the terms to describe Spain's 2007 Historical Memory Law, Russia's 2014 law prohibiting rehabilitation of Nazism, Ukraine's 2015 de-communization laws, and Poland's 2018 law prohibiting the attribution of responsibility for the atrocities of the Second World War to the Polish state or nation.

The Council of Europe has provided a working definition of memory law as laws which "enshrine state-approved interpretations of crucial historical events and promote certain narratives about the past, by banning, for example, the propagation of totalitarian ideologies or criminalising expressions which deny, grossly minimise, approve or justify acts constituting genocide or crimes against humanity, as defined by international law."

States tend to use memory laws to promote the classification of certain events from the past as genocides, crimes against humanity and other atrocities. This becomes especially relevant when there is no agreement within a state, among states or among experts (such as international lawyers) about the categorization of a historical crime. Frequently, such historical events are not recognized as genocides or crimes against humanity, respectively, under international law, since they predate the UN Genocide Convention. Memory laws adopted in national jurisdictions do not always comply with international law and, in particular, with international human rights law standards. For example, a law adopted in Lithuania includes a definition of genocide that is broader than the definition in international law.

== Types of memory laws ==
=== Non-punitive laws ===
Such legal acts are often adopted in a form of political declarations and parliamentary resolutions.

- Recognition of the Armenian genocide
- European Parliament resolution of 2 April 2009 on European conscience and totalitarianism
- European Parliament resolution of 23 October 2008 on the commemoration of the Holodomor, the Ukraine artificial famine (1932-1933)
- European Parliament resolution of 26 March 2019 on fundamental rights of people of African descent in Europe (2018/2899(RSP)

=== Bans of genocide denial ===
Laws against Holocaust denial and genocide denial bans entail a criminal sanction for denying and minimizing historical crimes. Initially Holocaust and genocide denial bans were considered a part of hate speech. Yet the recent doctrine of comparative constitutional law separates the notion of hate speech from genocide denialism, in particular, and memory laws, in general. Denial of the historical violence against minorities has been connected to the security of groups and individuals belonging to these minorities today. Therefore, the often-invoked rationale for imposing bans on the denial of historical crimes is that doing so prevents xenophobic violence and protects the public order today.

=== Bans of promotion of fascism or totalitarianism ===
Bans on propagating fascism and totalitarian regimes prohibit the promotion and whitewashing of the legacy of historical totalitarianisms. Such bans limit the freedom of expression to prevent the circulation of views that may undermine democracy itself, such as calls to abolish democracy or to deprive some individuals of human rights. The bans are popular in countries within the Council of Europe, especially in those with first-hand experience of twentieth century totalitarianism such as Nazism and Communism. This type of memory law also includes banning certain symbols linked to past totalitarian regimes, as well as bans on publishing certain literature.

See:

- Post–World War II legality of Nazi flags
- Bans on communist symbols
- Communist crimes

=== Protection of historical figures ===
Laws protecting historical figures prohibit disparaging the memory of national heroes often reinforce a cult of personality. Turkish Law 5816 ("The Law Concerning Crimes Committed Against Atatürk") (see Atatürk's cult of personality) and Heroes and Martyrs Protection Act adopted in China are examples of these types of memory laws.

=== Exculpatory memory laws ===
These memory laws are punitive laws which prohibit the expression of historical narratives that diverge from, challenge or nuance the official interpretation of the past. Such norms often include a criminal sanction for challenging official accounts of the past or for circulating competing interpretations. Laws prohibiting insult to the state and nation are devised to protect the state or nation from forms of insult, including "historical insult". These laws prohibit the attribution of responsibility for historical crimes, even when such attribution is based on historical facts. Some of these laws object to or even prohibit certain commemorations, especially held by minorities who have different views of historical events than a majorities or titular nations.

The EU research project, Memory Laws in European and Comparative Perspective, found that "laws by which governing entities impose self-exculpatory versions of history, by penalising those individuals or organisations who openly seek to criticise past wrongdoings perpetrated or assisted by governing entities or officials" are an urgent and dangerous threat to freedom of expression, more so than other types of memory laws. Scholar Eva-Clarita Pettai refers to these as "anti-liberal memory laws" that aim to "protect 'the nation' from the influence of liberal ideas of pluralism and open historical discourse" and "enforce a myth of national heroism/victimhood and defend perpetrators of state crimes against critical scrutiny". She adds that they emerge from an "authoritarian mind-set of state leaders and [their] need for legitimization".

According to the Special Rapporteur on Freedom of Expression of the Inter-American Commission on Human Rights, Edison Lanza, responding to attempted censorship under the Amendment to the Act on the Institute of National Remembrance, "the concept of 'defamation' of a nation or a state is incompatible with international standards that refer to the protection of the reputation of individual persons" and such a law would not be accepted under the Inter-American Convention on Human Rights.

See:

- Law Against Rehabilitation of Nazism in Russia
- 2018 Amendment to the Act on the Institute of National Remembrance in Poland
- Article 301 (Turkish Penal Code)
- Bans on Nakba Day
- Laws in Ukraine and Estonia which disallow negative interpretations of their respective nationalist movements, which collaborated with the Nazis.

== Memory laws and the politics of memory ==
Memory laws constitute a central element to the politics of memory and impact on the culture of historical memory and culture of remembrance.

Maria Mälksoo uses the term "mnemonic security" to describe the function of memory laws as element of historical and security policies in post-Soviet context. Competing nationalisms may be channeled through memory laws adopted in neighboring countries sharing a difficult history and producing conflicting accounts on the past. Nikolai Koposov calls such phenomenon "memory wars".

The nexus of securitization and historical memory is visible in constitutional and criminal law provisions in post-Soviet democracies in Central and Eastern Europe. Uladzislau Belavusau introduced the term and has marked the rise of "mnemonic constitutionalism" in Europe, that is a type of legislation and judicial decisions that transcend pure measures against genocide denialism and declarative memory laws postulating or commemorating certain historical events", embedding historical myths into constitutional texts and major statutes.

== Memory laws across the world ==
=== Europe ===
==== Council of Europe ====
Framework decision on combating antisemitism and other forms of racism from 2008.

==== European Union ====
European Union: EU Parliament resolution of 1 April 2009 on European Conscience and Totalitarianism, European Parliament resolution of 15 April 2015 on the centenary of the Armenian Genocide.

==== Albania ====
Genocide law, enacted in 1995, repealed in 1997 during the Albanian civil unrest.

==== Bulgaria ====
2016 amendments to ban on communist symbols.

==== France ====
France criminalizes denial, minimizing, and grossly abating Holocaust and other genocides recognized by international tribunals on the grounds of the first of the French lois memorielles loi Gayssot and subsequent judicial reviews by Constitutional Council. In 2001 on the grounds of loi Taubira France officially condemned historical slave trade as crime against humanity. In counterpoint, in 2005 the country adopted loi Mekacher with provisions ordering to include information about positive elements of French presence in colonies, in particular in North Africa. Those controversial elements of the law were later on struck as unconstitutional by the Conseil Constitutionnel.

==== Hungary ====
2011 Fundamental Law (the Constitution) which establishes a radical cesura between the past and present Hungarian State.

==== Poland ====
1998 laws against the denial of Soviet-era atrocities.

2016 amendment to the Act on the Institute of National Remembrance, punishing up to three years imprisonment for intentional referring to concentration and extermination camps built and run by Nazi Germany on the occupied Polish territory during the Second World War as "Polish death/concentration camps".

Access to Russian archives on the Katyn Massacre pronounced in the European Court of Human Rights judgment Janowiec and Others v. Russia in 2012.

==== Spain ====
Laws easing the granting of citizenship to descendant of Sephardic Jews expelled in 1492 by the Alhambra Decree.

Historical Memory Law from 2007, amended in 2016, aimed at dealing with some of the legacy of the dictatorship of Franco, and partly addressed the previous bi-partisan agreement during its democratic transition known as Pact of Forgetting.

The Democratic Memory Law of 2022 which further addressed the legacy of Francoism.

==== Ukraine ====
2006 law against denying the Holodomor

2015 Ukrainian decommunization laws

2016 ban on communist symbols

==== Russia ====
2014 Federal Law which defends positive narrative about the Soviet Union based on dominant Russian narratives about Great Patriotic War and the USSR's role in defeating Nazi Germany, known as law against public rehabilitation of Nazism.

=== Middle East ===
==== Israel ====
The barriers to the commemoration of the mass displacement of Palestinians in Israel, so-called Nakba laws. See also Arab school in Haifa controversy.

=== Asia ===
Bangladesh

2016 draft Liberation War Denial Crimes Act.

=== South America ===
==== Chile ====
Laws aiming at overturning Amnesty Laws dating back to Gen. Augusto Pinochet military dictatorship.

==== Argentina ====
Juicios por la Verdad

=== Africa ===
==== Rwanda ====
2003 Law No. 33n bis/2003 of 2003 Repressing the Crime of Genocide, Crimes Against Humanity and War Crimes

2008 Law No. 18/2008 of 2008 Relating to the Punishment of the Crime of Genocide Ideology

=== United Nations ===
The Convention on the Prevention and Punishment of the Crime of Genocide from 1948

== See also ==
- Censorship in Germany
- Culture of Remembrance
- Damnatio memoriae
- De-commemoration
- Freedom of speech
- Historical negationism
- Memorialization
- Politics of memory
- Official history
- Speech crimes
- Thoughtcrime
- Truth-seeking
