= Yarovaya law =

Russian federal legislation

Federal Assembly
- Long title: On Amendments to the Federal Law "On Countering Terrorism" and Certain Legislative Acts of the Russian Federation regarding the establishment of additional measures to counter terrorism and ensure public security
- Citation: 374-FZ; 375-FZ
- Territorial extent: Russia
- Signed by: President Vladimir Putin
- Signed: 7 July 2016
- Commenced: 20 July 2016; 1 July 2018

Legislative history
- Introduced by: Irina Yarovaya (YR); Aleksey Pushkov (YR); Nadezhda Gerasimova (YR)
- First reading: 24 June 2016 (State Duma)
- Second reading: 29 June 2016 (Federation Council)

Related legislation
- Criminal Code of Russia; Law Against Rehabilitation of Nazism

Keywords
- Religious freedom in Russia
- Status: Current legislation

The Yarovaya law (in Russian: Закон Яровой, transliteration: Zakon Jarovoy), also Yarovaya package or Yarovaya — Ozerov package is a set of two Russian federal bills, 374-FZ and 375-FZ, passed in 2016. The bills amend previous counter-terrorism laws and separate laws which regulate additional counter-terror and public safety measures. The public names the law after the last name of one of its creators—Irina Yarovaya.

The amendments included an expansion of authority for law enforcement agencies, new requirements for data collection and mandatory decoding in the telecommunications industry, as well as the increased regulation of evangelism, including a ban on the performance of "missionary activities" in non-religious settings.

== Legislative history ==
In April 2016 Irina Yarovaya, together with Aleksei Pushkov, and Nadezhda Gerasimova and senator Victor Ozerov introduced a project of legislation that would toughen penalties for extremism and terrorism. On 13 May 2016, the law passed after the first reading. Prior to that, it had received support from the prime minister's cabinet. On 7 July it was signed by the President of Russia, Vladimir Putin.

Most of the act's amendments came into effect on July 20, 2016. Amendments that require telecom operators to store recordings of phone conversations, text messages and users' internet traffic up to 6 months were announced to come into force on July 1, 2018. However, senator Anton Belyakov has submitted a proposal to move the regulations' effective date to 2023, because of the extreme amount of data storage technology needed to meet the requirements.

== Content ==
=== Penal provisions ===
The amendments of the Yarovaya law include lengthening of prison terms for a number of criminal activities, introducing new reasons to deny entry or departure to and from Russia, and the introduction of criminal liability for failure to report to law enforcement authorities that someone else "has been planning, is perpetrating, or has perpetrated" terrorist activity.

=== Surveillance provisions ===
The Yarovaya amendments require telecom providers to store the content of voice calls, data, images and text messages for 6 months, and their metadata (e.g. time, location and message sender and recipients) for 3 years. Online services such as messaging services, email and social networks that use encrypted data are required to permit the Federal Security Service (FSB) to access and read their encrypted communications.

Internet and telecom companies are required to disclose these communications and metadata, as well as "all other information necessary" to authorities on request and without a court order.

=== Anti-evangelism provisions ===
The amendments also include new restrictions on evangelism and missionary work. The amendments add a new provision to Russia's Religion Legislation, stating that "missionary activity" may only be performed "without hindrance" at churches and other religious sites designated by the chapter. It is explicitly banned from residential buildings. "Missionary activity" is defined as

The activity of a religious association, aimed at disseminating information about its beliefs among people who are not participants (members, followers) in that religious association, with the purpose of involving these people as participants (members, followers). It is carried out directly by religious associations or by citizens and/or legal entities authorised by them, publicly, with the help of the media, the internet or other lawful means".

Missionary activities may not be used to pursue violations of public safety, "the motivation of citizens to refuse to fulfil their civic duties as established by law and to commit other illegal acts", suicide, or the refusal of medical treatment on religious grounds as aims.

Missionary activities may only be performed by authorized members of registered religious groups and organizations. A group becomes ineligible to perform missionary activities if they have been banned under a court order for practicing extremism or terrorism, or have been liquidated. Foreign missionaries may only perform missionary activities after registering for a permit from a recognized religious organization. Citizens are also required to report unauthorized religious activity to the government or face fines.

== Implementation ==
=== Surveillance provisions ===
Because of the unprecedented data storage requirements, implementation of the law has been described as impossible and extremely expensive. The Russian Post estimated that compliance with the law would cost the organization 500 billion rubles for initial purchases of equipment and 100 billion rubles yearly. Implementation of the law by other delivery and freight services was estimated to cost around 180 billion rubles, which is projected to cause 30–40% drop in online number of purchases. Cell service operators will need 2.2 trillion rubles to comply, which will cause a two- or threefold rise in the cost of mobile services for the consumer. Edward Snowden estimated the combined cost of implementation to be 33 billion dollars and predicted that the overall security levels will be unaffected, despite giant affiliated costs.

After Putin signed the law, it turned out that equipment that is needed to store all the data is non-existent not only in Russia, but in the world. Because of that Putin has issued a call for government contracts to Russian companies for the required hardware and software.

=== Anti-evangelism provisions ===
A number of missionaries have been subject to arrest for violating the law and, upon conviction, have been fined. Donald and Ruth Ossewaarde, independent missionaries working in Oryol, were fined 40,000 rubles (around $700), prompting the couple to leave the country; Sergei Zhuravlyov, a Ukrainian Reformed Orthodox Church of Christ representative, was arrested for engaging in preaching in St. Petersburg; and Ebenezer Tuah of Ghana, the leader of the Christ Embassy church, was arrested and fined 50,000 rubles for conducting baptisms at a sanatorium.

On 9 July 2016, Jim Mulcahy, a 72-year-old American pastor who is the Eastern European coordinator for the U.S.-based Metropolitan Community Church, was arrested and deported under the prohibition of missionary activities at non-religious sites, after advertising and holding a "tea party" in Samara with an LGBT group. Authorities had targeted Mulcahy under suspicions that he was planning to organize a same-sex wedding.

== Criticism and protests ==
Russia's largest telecommunication and internet companies expressed their concerns regarding the negative impacts of the law on their businesses and on the Russian economy on the whole. A Change.org petition to completely cancel Yarovaya's Act collected over 600,000 signatures. Russian Public Initiative petition has been signed more than 100,000 times. A number of protests were organized in cities, including in Novosibirsk, Yekaterinburg, Ufa, Kazan and Volgograd. A 9 August protest in Moscow has seen over 2,000 participants.

=== Criticisms of anti-evangelism provisions ===
The anti-evangelism provisions of the legislation prompted an outcry of concern and opposition from Russia's Protestant minority, which makes up about 1% of Russia's population. According to experts, the law is likely to be interpreted in a way to block churches other than the Russian Orthodox Church from evangelizing ethnic Russians. Religious denominations with a smaller presence in Russia have long been viewed with hostility by government officials and Russian Orthodox religious authorities. The harsh new restrictions on minority religious groups supplemented the requirements under a 1997 law that mandated registration and administrative procedures, which many religious groups found onerous and expensive to comply with.

Thomas J. Reese, the chair of the U.S. Commission on International Religious Freedom, said that "Neither these measures nor the currently existing anti-extremism law meet international human rights and religious freedom standards" and that the Yarovaya Law "will make it easier for Russian authorities to repress religious communities, stifle peaceful dissent, and detain and imprison people."

=== Criticisms of expanded surveillance provisions ===
The Electronic Frontier Foundation, a nonprofit group that aims to defend civil liberties in the digital world, opposed the Yarovaya package, noting that "opposition to the Yarovaya package has come from many quarters. Technical experts have been united in opposing the law. Russia’s government Internet ombudsman opposed the bill. Putin's own human rights head, Mikhail Fedotov, called upon the Senators of Russia’s Federal Council to reject the bill. ISPs have pointed out that compliance would cost them trillions of rubles." The EFF wrote that because Russia's ISPs, messaging services, and social media platforms "cannot reasonably comply with all the demands of the Yarovaya package, they become de facto criminals whatever their actions. And that, in turn, gives the Russian state the leverage to extract from them any other concession it desires. The impossibility of full compliance is not a bug—it's an essential feature." Human Rights Watch noted the lack of judicial oversight and stated that "these provisions would ultimately jeopardize security, while being ineffective at preventing terrorists from using encryption" as well as "unjustifiably expand surveillance while undermining human rights and cybersecurity."

== See also ==
- Mass surveillance in Russia
- SORM
- Sovereign Internet Law
