= Probiv =

Probiv (Russian: пробив, lit. 'to pierce' or 'to punch through') is an illicit data market operating primarily in Russia, where personal information from restricted government and corporate databases is bought and sold through networks of corrupt officials and insiders.

The probiv market operates as a parallel information economy built on corrupt officials from various sectors including traffic police, banks, telecommunications companies, and security services who sell access to restricted databases. For fees ranging from as little as $10 to several hundred dollars, buyers can obtain passport numbers, addresses, travel histories, vehicle registrations, and telecommunications records.

The market operates through various channels, including specialized Telegram bots and darknet forums.

== Notable uses ==
Probiv services have been utilized by diverse actors for various purposes. Investigative journalists have used the market to conduct high-profile investigations, including tracing the FSB unit allegedly behind the poisoning of Alexei Navalny.

Russian police and security services themselves have routinely used the black market to track activists and opposition figures. Since Russia's invasion of Ukraine, Ukrainian intelligence services have exploited the market to identify Russian military officials.

== Government response ==
In late 2024, Russian authorities introduced legislation imposing penalties of up to ten years in prison for accessing or distributing leaked data. Several operators of probiv services, including the teams behind Usersbox and Solaris, have been arrested.

However, the crackdown appears to have had unintended consequences. Many operators have relocated their businesses abroad, where they operate with fewer constraints. Some services that previously cooperated with Russian authorities have severed those ties and moved staff out of the country.

== See also ==
- Mass surveillance in Russia
