= SS7 probe =

Device for probing telecommunications networks

An SS7 probe is a physical device to obtain signalling and/or bearer information from a telecommunications network, such as the PSTN or a corporate telephone system. The probe passively monitors the E1/T1 or SDH/SONET bearer channels, and extracts the signalling information for onward presentation to an application. A passive probe does not affect the network under observation—this is achieved through use of protected monitor points on the network distribution frames.

== Applications ==
The network application may be lawful interception or a revenue-generating application such as missed call. Probes are also extensively used in operational support systems (OSS).

Applications served by probes include solutions for inter-carrier billing, revenue loss (by-pass/phantom traffic and analysis services), fraud prevention, billing, local number portability, quality of service, surveillance (global call trace), maintenance (protocol analysis), traffic engineering (link and trunk forecasting), alarming and SS7, Sigtran and IS-41 monitoring.

Passive monitoring probes provide a network and switch vendor-independent solution for network applications.

=== Lawful interception ===
Lawful interception concerns the delivery of calls and data to government approved reception centres. Interception is authorized through a legal framework, such as UK RIPA or US CALEA or Russia SORM.

== Technology ==
SS7 probe technology provides the correct physical interface to the telecommunications network. Opportunities for probing occur in both traditional TDM infrastructure as well as in ATM and IP networks. The different characteristics and infrastructure used for these interfaces is reflected in the types of interfaces to be monitored. These range from E1 or T1 2 Mbit/s or 1.5Mbs to SDH and SONET STM-x OC-x multiplexes.
