= Tata Neu =

Multi-purpose super-app

- Logo
- Developer: Tata Digital
- Release: 7 April 2022; 4 years ago
- Operating system: Android, iOS, Web
- Available in: English
- Website: tataneu.com

Tata Neu is a multi-purpose super app, developed in India by Tata Digital of the Tata Group.

== History ==
The Tata Neu app was launched on 7 April 2022. The launch coincided with the start of a 2022 Indian Premier League league stage match between the Delhi Capitals and Lucknow Super Giants. Shortly after the launch, the app's servers were overloaded. Sales numbers missed the US$200 million target set by Tata Digital. Reports stated that Tata Digital received as much as US$2 billion in funding from the Tata Group for the Tata Neu app and additional investments. By May end, the app had nearly 11 million downloads but suffered constant glitches and had slow response time leading to a reduction in customer usage.

As the reports of high number of bugs and sluggish user experience continued, reports emerged that the Tata Neu CTO had resigned within 4 months. The app faced backlash over sharing of customer information between group companies. In January 2023, Mukesh Bansal, then President of Tata Digital and head of operations for Tata Neu, stepped down, with Pratik Pal, then CEO of Tata Digital, looking after the business decisions at the firm. Soon, reports emerged that Tata Neu was set to miss the first year GMV target by as much as 50%. Internal projections showed the company revising the GMV target by March 2023 to US$4 billion from US$8 billion (which was scaled down from US$10 billion).
