= Amendment to the Act on the Institute of National Remembrance =

Polish law penalizing blame of Poles and Poland for having a role in the Holocaust

The Amendment to the Act on the Institute of National Remembrance of 2018 is a partly repealed Polish law that criminalized public speech attributing responsibility for the Holocaust to Poland or the Polish nation; the criminal provisions were removed again later that year, after international protests. Article 2a, addressing crimes against "Polish citizens" by "Ukrainian nationalists", also caused controversy. The legislation is part of the historical policy of the Law and Justice party which seeks to present a narrative of ethnic Poles exclusively as victims and heroes. The law was widely seen as an infringement on freedom of expression and on academic freedom, and as a barrier to open discussion on Polish collaborationism, leading to what has been described as "the biggest diplomatic crisis in [Poland's] recent history".

While the act does not mention the "Polish death camp" controversy (involving concentration camps that had been built by Nazi Germany during World War II on German-occupied Polish soil), the act's chief intent was to address that controversy. In 2019, the Constitutional Tribunal of Poland ruled that Article 2a was void and non-binding.

== History ==
A 2006 amendment with some of the same aims, Article 132a of the Polish Penal Code, was passed in 2006 with the efforts of Minister of Justice Zbigniew Ziobro but was invalidated two years later on procedural grounds. The amendment was seen as targeting the writings of historian Jan T. Gross, whose work on the Jedwabne Pogrom triggered wide public debate in Poland; the amendment was frequently dubbed Lex Gross (Latin: Gross's Law).

After a period of lobbying, the first version of the 2018 Amendment was drafted on 17 February 2016 by Minister of Justice Zbigniew Ziobro. On 30 August 2016, the Council of Ministers, presided over by Prime Minister Beata Szydło, forwarded the draft to the Sejm. In September 2016, Zbigniew Ziobro asserted that the "Polish death camp" term constituted an attack on the "good name of the Polish nation". The proposed legislation was criticized internationally as an attempt to suppress discussion of crimes that had been committed during the Holocaust by Polish citizens. The addition of the "ban on propaganda of Banderism" to the law (Article 2a) was spearheaded by the right-wing political movement, Kukiz'15. Kukiz'15 submitted this addition on July 16, 2016, however it was blocked by Civic Platform and Law and Justice parties citing "the good of Polish–Ukrainian relations". Eventually, Article 2a was added to the bill on 25 January 2018 during the second reading.

On 26 January 2018, after the bill's third reading, the Polish Parliament's lower chamber, the Sejm, approved the bill, which would apply to Poles as well as to foreigners. On 1 February 2018 the upper chamber, the Senate, passed the bill without amendment. On 6 February 2018 President Andrzej Duda signed the bill into law. According to an opinion poll conducted in February 2018, 51% of Poles opposed the 2018 amendment. Some parts of the law came into effect 14 days after its registration in Dziennik Ustaw (the Register of Statutes), with the full law coming into effect within 3 months. The law was referred to the Constitutional Tribunal of Poland for review of its compliance with the Polish Constitution.

The bill led to an outcry of condemnations against the Polish government in the United States, Europe, and Israel. Some critics went so far as to accuse the Polish government of Holocaust denial. The Simon Wiesenthal Center issued a travel advisory urging Jews to limit visits to Poland due to "Poland's government campaign to change the historical truth by denying Polish complicity in the Nazi atrocities".

As of May 2018, 70 different charges under the act were filed in Polish courts. Most, however, were by Polish citizens protesting the law by filing a self-incrimination. A non-protest charge was filed against the BBC for a production on the Auschwitz concentration camp that used the term "Polish Jewish ghettos".

== Original bill ==
The proposed law modifies a previous law relating to the Institute of National Remembrance (namely, the Act of 18 December 1998 on the Institute of National Remembrance – Commission for the Prosecution of Crimes against the Polish Nation (Dz.U. 1998 nr 155 poz. 1016)).

Articles added in February 2018 included the following:

- Article 53o:

Protecting the reputation of the Republic of Poland and the Polish Nation shall be governed by the provisions of the Civil Code Act of 23 April 1964 (Polish Journal of Laws of 2016, items 380, 585 and 1579) on the protection of personal rights. A court action aimed at protecting the Republic of Poland’s or the Polish Nation’s reputation may be brought by a non-governmental organisation within the remit of its statutory activities. Any resulting compensation or damages shall be awarded to the State Treasury.

- Article 53p:

A court action aimed at protecting the Republic of Poland’s or the Polish Nation’s reputation may also be brought by the Institute of National Remembrance. In such cases, the Institute of National Remembrance shall have the capacity to be a party to court proceedings.

- Article 55a:

1. Whoever claims, publicly and contrary to the facts, that the Polish Nation or the Republic of Poland is responsible or co-responsible for Nazi crimes committed by the Third Reich, as specified in Article 6 of the Charter of the International Military Tribunal enclosed to the International agreement for the prosecution and punishment of the major war criminals of the European Axis, signed in London on 8 August 1945 (Polish Journal of Laws of 1947, item 367), or for other felonies that constitute crimes against peace, crimes against humanity or war crimes, or whoever otherwise grossly diminishes the responsibility of the true perpetrators of said crimes—shall be liable to a fine or imprisonment for up to 3 years. The sentence shall be made public.

2. If the act specified in clause 1 is committed unintentionally, the perpetrator shall be liable to a fine or a restriction of liberty.

3. No offence is committed if the criminal act specified in clauses 1 and 2 is committed in the course of one's artistic or academic activity.'

- Article 2a:

The crimes of Ukrainian nationalists and members of Ukrainian organizations collaborating with the Third German Reich, as defined in the Act, are acts committed by Ukrainian nationalists in the years 1925–1950, involving the use of violence, terror or other forms of violation of human rights, against individuals or ethnic groups. One of the crimes of Ukrainian nationalists and members of Ukrainian organizations collaborating with the Third German Reich is their involvement in the extermination of the Jewish population and genocide of citizens of the Second Polish Republic in Volhynia and Eastern Lesser Poland."

== Subsequent amendment ==
Pressure from the United States Department of State and the threat of downgrading the US-Poland relationship was significant in causing the Polish government to change course. In late June 2018, the Polish government decided to stop waiting for a ruling from the constitutional court and in a hasty process, the legislation passed in record speed, only eight and a half hours, modified the act. The revision removed Articles 55a and 55b and thus the possibility of criminal prosecution, but thereby also removed the exemption for scholarship and the arts. Charges may still be levied in a civil court.

Following the amendment, the Polish and Israeli prime ministers issued a joint declaration condemning antisemitism and rejecting "anti-Polonism". This statement was condemned by Yad Vashem and its former director, Holocaust survivor Yitzhak Arad, because it was seen as equating the two.

== Legal analysis ==
The Polish government's rationale for the law was that it was similar to laws against Holocaust denial in many Western European countries. Law scholars, however, have rejected this comparison, noting that the Polish law, unlike Holocaust denial laws, is intended to protect national honor. They state that the law is more closely related to Turkey's Article 301, which has been used to prosecute Turkish citizens who acknowledge the Armenian Genocide.

Polish law scholars Aleksandra Gliszczyńska-Grabias, Grażyna Baranowska, and Anna Wójcik state that with the revised version of the law, "the risk of violations of individual rights and freedoms remains high".

Polish legal scholar Patrycja Grzebyk writes that "A scientist who would like to investigate crimes committed by Polish citizens or the scale of Polish collaboration risks the loss of his time, money and reputation in lengthy proceedings against her/him commenced by someone who feels insulted." Even the revised version of the law is inconsistent with international law and human rights standards, as it "limit[s] freedom of speech and scientific activity in a disproportional way and entitle[s] NGOs to bring a lawsuit on behalf of the Polish state or nation". Uladzislau Belavusau writes that, despite repeal of criminal sanctions, "the fears that the 2018 Law may negatively impact on freedom of expression about Polish history have solid foundations... Potentially anybody who expresses views that are counter to the official version of history recognised by the Polish State could fall under its scope."

American jurist Alexander Tsesis states that the law, even its revised form, "restricts the acquisition, expression, and dissemination of knowledge" and "its ambiguity makes it uncertain who will be punished and for what communications", leading to a chilling effect on "satire, political commentary, historical analysis, and eyewitness testimony". He concludes that "Poland's effort to control the public spread of information is likely to lead to misleading conclusions that downplay victims' sufferings and incite hate propaganda."

Polish law scholar Tomasz Tadeusz Koncewicz states that "The new law politicizes historical discussion and instrumentalizes law to achieve the desired reading of history and the past." The law "is the most recent proof that in Poland the past continues to be seen as a collection of indisputable truths, not open to divergent interpretations and historical debate". Constitutional law scholar Wojciech Sadurski states that "[t]he chilling effect of such penal and civil sanctions upon scholarly or journalistic debates regarding the darker sides of Polish history is obvious" and that the law "concerns not so much statements of fact, but rather an opinion: an opinion about (the alleged) responsibility of, say, passive onlookers. To punish for an opinion is an anathema to any system of freedom of expression."

== Compatibility with international law ==
According to Polish scholar of constitutional law Piotr Mikuli, the amendment appears to contradict provisions of the Polish constitution including: "Art. 2 from which the so-called principle of decent legislation may be derived, Art. 42 para. 1 expressing the rule nullum crimen sine lege and Art. 54 para. 1 on the freedom to express opinions." He also expressed the opinion that it did not meet the requirement of being necessary in a democratic society in order to allow a restriction in freedom of speech per Article 10 of the European Convention on Human Rights. Other law scholars have also questioned the compatibility of the law with international human rights standards, especially the European Convention on Human Rights.

== Reactions to Article 55a ==
=== Poland ===
On 29 January 2018 Polish President Andrzej Duda responded to official Israeli objections to the Polish bill, saying that Poland had been a victim of Nazi Germany and had not taken part in the Holocaust. "I can never accept the slandering and libeling of us Poles as a nation or of Poland as a country through the distortion of historical truth and through false accusations." On 31 January 2018, before the Polish Senate vote on the bill, Deputy Prime Minister Beata Szydło said: "We Poles were victims, as were the Jews ... It is a duty of every Pole to defend the good name of Poland."

A letter signed by many prominent persons in early February, including journalist Anne Applebaum and the 3rd President of Poland Aleksander Kwaśniewski, said: "Why should the victims and witnesses of the Holocaust have to watch what they say for fear of being arrested, and will the testimony of a Jewish survivor who "feared Poles" be a punishable offence?". According to Barbara Kirshenblatt-Gimblett of the POLIN museum, "These attempts to legislate what can and cannot be said is actually destroying the good name of Poland."

Stanisław Krajewski of the University of Warsaw, co-chair the Polish Council of Christians and Jews, expressed his fear that the law would become "a blunt instrument for paralysing and punishing anyone you don't like", and that "the government's harsh, dismissive reaction" would encourage violence against Jews. The Polish Bishops' Conference noted a rise in anti-Semitism after the amendment was passed, declaring the phenomenon "contrary to the Christian tenet of loving one's neighbor", and the Union of Jewish Religious Communities in Poland said the legislation has led to a "growing wave of intolerance, xenophobia, and anti-Semitism", making many members fearful for their safety.

According to a survey from February 2018, 40% of Poles supported the criminal penalties in the law, while 51% felt that the issue should be addressed differently.

Research has shown that the law had the perverse effect of boosting worldwide searches for the English phrase "Polish death camps" ninefold, while increasing antisemitism expression in Polish public discourse and social media.

=== Israel ===
Even before being passed, the law damaged Israel–Poland relations. Israel's Foreign Ministry director-general Yuval Rotem reported that preserving the memory of the Holocaust takes priority over international relations. He said that "Preserving the memory of the Holocaust is a matter beyond the bilateral relationship between Israel and Poland. It is a core issue cutting to the essence of the Jewish people". Israel's Prime Minister Benjamin Netanyahu accused Poland of Holocaust denial. Yad Vashem condemned the Polish bill, saying that, while "Polish death camps" as a phrase is a historic misrepresentation, the legislation is "liable to blur the historical truths regarding the assistance the Germans received from the Polish population during the Holocaust".

Other Israeli officials such as Education and Diaspora Affairs Minister Naftali Bennett have termed the expression a "misrepresentation", although Bennett said of the proposed law "This is a shameful disregard of the truth. It is a historic fact that many Poles aided in the murder of Jews, handed them in, abused them, and even killed Jews during and after the Holocaust." Israeli president Reuven Rivlin said in Auschwitz that historians should be able to study the Holocaust without restrictions. He also stated "There is no doubt that many Poles fought against the Nazi regime, but we cannot deny the fact that Poland and Poles lent a hand to the annihilation".

Israel's official memorial to the victims of the Holocaust, Yad Vashem, has opined: "There is no doubt that the term 'Polish death camps' is a historical misrepresentation ... . However, restrictions on statements by scholars and others regarding the Polish people's direct or indirect complicity with the crimes committed on their land during the Holocaust are a serious distortion." Israeli political scientist Shlomo Avineri said young Israelis unintentionally associate the Holocaust with Poland, sometimes far more than with Nazi Germany. Writing in Haaretz, he called for a reappraisal of Israeli Holocaust education policy, to more greatly emphasize German culpability and Polish resistance during the March of the Living.

=== Other countries ===
In the U.S., Secretary of State Rex Tillerson expressed "disappointment" in the bill, adding: "Enactment of this law adversely affects freedom of speech and academic inquiry."

While the American Jewish Committee (AJC) has stated that it "has been for decades critical of such harmful terms as 'Polish concentration camps' and 'Polish death camps,' recognizing that these sites were erected and managed by Nazi Germany during its occupation of Poland", AJC has also said that, "while we remember the brave Poles who saved Jews, the role of some Poles in murdering Jews cannot be ignored", and that the AJC is "firmly opposed to legislation that would penalize claims that Poland or Polish citizens bear responsibility for any Holocaust crimes".

=== Scholars and historians ===
In February 2018, the American Historical Association released a statement calling the law "a threat both to historians' freedom of speech and to the future of historical scholarship". Their statement was later endorsed by 50 scholarly associations. The Polish Center for Holocaust Research called the law an "unprecedented (and unknown in a democratic system) intrusion into the debate about the Polish history".

Dovid Katz wrote that the law was "an overreaction to some common mischaracterizations of Poland's role in the Holocaust", including "the myth that Hitler chose to build concentration camps there because Poland was so antisemitic". However, he judged other Eastern European memory laws to be worse, including laws in Hungary, Lithuania, and Latvia which criminalize disagreement with the idea that there was a Soviet genocide in these countries with a prison sentence and Estonian and Ukrainian laws which criminalize negative interpretations of those countries' collaborationist nationalist movements. What he found truly outrageous was the international silence to these non-Polish "legislative acts that criminalize truth-telling about the Holocaust".

Jeffrey Kopstein of the University of Toronto and Jason Wittenberg of the University of California, Berkeley, authors of the book, Intimate Violence: Anti-Jewish Pogroms on the Eve of the Holocaust, about anti-Jewish violence in occupied Poland after the Nazi invasion of Soviet Union, opine that the purpose of the new bill "is clear: to restrict discussion of Polish complicity." They also suggest that "Poland's current government will likely face the unpalatable prospect of enforcing an unenforceable law and denying what the mainstream scholarly community has increasingly shown to be true: Some Poles were complicit in the Holocaust."

American jurist Alexander Tsesis criticized the law for being ambiguous, for limiting dissemination of knowledge and for being vague.

== Response to Article 2a ==
In 2019, the Constitutional Tribunal of Poland ruled that Article 2a was void and non-binding.

Article 2a was criticized because the law singled out "Ukrainians" as the only national group explicitly stated to have carried out crimes, while the only action qualified as "genocide" was the massacres of Poles in Volhynia. It also was worded in such a way as to criminalize Ukrainian attacks on Polish military targets, which were not illegal under international law. Klaus Bachmann states that "the discussion whether Ukrainian collaborationists committed genocide, war crimes or crimes against humanity during the last years of the war in Wolhynia, which has been ongoing for several decades, can now be interrupted by a prosecutor at any time" because anyone who disagrees that the events were genocide is liable for prosecution.

The Amendment's passage worsened Polish–Ukrainian relations, already contentious on the questions of the prewar Organization of Ukrainian Nationalists and the wartime and postwar Ukrainian Insurgent Army. Stepan Bandera and Roman Shukhevych have been considered Ukrainian national heroes in Ukraine, and war criminals in Poland. In Ukraine, the Amendment has been called "the Anti-Banderovite Law".

The Polish law has been compared to Ukrainian Law 2538-1, passed in 2015.

=== Controversy over mission statement ===
Article 1 - the mission statement of the Institute - was changed to include "protecting the reputation of the Republic of Poland and the Polish Nation". Prof. Havi Dreifuss, head of Yad Vashem's Center for Research on the Holocaust in Poland, noted that: "Since the law changed, the IPN's fundamental role has changed. Today their official mission statement is to defend Poland's reputation, and it is in that light that they should be viewed."

== See also ==
- German-occupied Europe
- The Holocaust in Poland
- Law Against Rehabilitation of Nazism
- Polish law against Holocaust denial
- Polish Order of the White Eagle controversy, 2026
