= Zakharov v. Russia =

European Court of Human Rights case

Decided 4 December 2015
- Full case name: Zakharov v. Russia
- Case: 47143/06
- ECLI: ECLI:CE:ECHR:2015:1204JUD004714306
- Chamber: Grand Chamber

Court composition
- President; Dean Spielmann
- Judges: Josep Casadevall; Guido Raimondi; Ineta Ziemele; Mark Villiger; Luis López Guerra; Khanlar Hajiyev; Angelika Nußberger; Julia Laffranque; Linos-Alexandre Sicilianos; Erik Møse; André Potocki; Paul Lemmens; Helena Jäderblom; Faris Vehabović; Ksenija Turković; Dmitry Dedov

Zakharov v. Russia was a 2015 court case before the European Court of Human Rights involving Roman Zakharov and the Russian Federation. The Court ruled that Russia's legal provisions governing communications surveillance did not provide adequate safeguards against arbitrariness or abuse, and that therefore a violation took place of Article 8 of the European Convention of Human Rights (right to privacy).

== Case ==
In 2003, editor Roman Zakharov brought judicial proceeding against three mobile network operators, claiming that there had been a violation of his right to the privacy of his communications. He maintained that Russia's SORM system (surveillance equipment installed at mobile phone companies) enables unrestricted interception of all telephone communications by the security services without prior judicial authorization. The claim was rejected on the grounds that Zakharov did not prove to be a victim of such an interception himself. The rejection was upheld in 2006.

In 2006, Zakharov lodged a case with the ECtHR. He relied on Article 8 (right to privacy), arguing that Russia's national law permitted the security services to intercept, through technical means, any person's communications without obtaining prior judicial authorization. He further relied on Article 13 (right to an effective remedy), complaining that he had no effective legal remedy at national level to challenge that legislation.

Russia maintained that Zakharov could not be considered a victim because Orange Slovensko, a. s. v. Slovakia upheld that private companies can install interception equipment without violating the Convention. Furthermore, Russia argued that an applicant had to demonstrate a "reasonable likelihood" that their private life was being documented and recorded by security agencies.Exceptions to this rule were permissible only in the most unique of circumstances. Since Zakharov failed to produce any evidence to prove that he was being spied upon, Russia claimed that he did not meet the "reasonable likelihood" criteria. Finally, Russia argued that Zakharov did not go through all of the national channels available to him before appealing to the European Court of Human Rights.

== Findings ==
In a unanimous Grand Chamber decision, the Court ruled that several aspects of Russian surveillance legislation were incompatible with the European Convention on Human Rights:

- Communications surveillance is permitted for a broad range of criminal offenses and authorities have "an almost unlimited degree of discretion" in the matter;
- Surveillance is not limited to those suspected of having committed offenses;
- Criteria for beginning, ceasing and scope of the surveillance are not clearly defined;
- Robust oversight mechanisms and effective remedies were lacking, mainly:
  - Logging or recording of the interceptions is prohibited by Russian law;
  - Supervision of interception by judges and prosecutors is limited, does not include checks for necessity and justification, and is not open to public scrutiny;
  - The absence of a requirement to notify the subject when surveillance had ceased undermines the effectiveness of any available remedies

Although Russian law generally provided for prior judicial authorization of communications surveillance, the Court concluded that in practice, this could be circumvented. It also remarked that the proceedings indicate the existence of arbitrary and abusive surveillance practices.

Russia's SORM system was therefore found to be inconsistent with the requirements of Article 8. The Court held that the existence of the contested legislation amounted to an interference with Zakharov's rights.

== Aftermath ==
On the same day of the ruling, the Russian government passed a law allowing it to overrule international court orders to "protect the interests of Russia" if these orders are contradictory to the constitutional law.

Commentators have noted the decision for the fact that the applicant was able to challenge the surveillance regulatory framework without being required to prove that he had been spied upon himself. The Court instead considered the legislation in abstracto as well as its application in practice.

The case was featured in Oxfords University Press blog in its 2015 "Top ten developments in international law" list.

== See also ==
- SORM
