= Super app =

Mobile application that provides multiple services including financial transactions

A super app or super-app (also known as an everything app) is a mobile or web application that can provide multiple services including payment and instant messaging services, effectively becoming an all-encompassing, self-contained, commerce and communication online platform that embraces many aspects of personal and commercial life. Notable examples of super apps include Tencent's WeChat in China, Tata Neu in India, Grab in Southeast Asia and Max in Russia.

For end users, a super app is an application that provides a set of core features while also giving access to independently developed miniapps. For app developers, a super app is an application integrated with the capabilities of platforms and ecosystems that allows third-parties to develop and publish miniapps.

== History ==
The super app term was first used to describe WeChat when it combined the instant messaging service with the digital wallet function. Recognition of WeChat as a super app stems from its combination of messaging, payments, e-commerce, and much more within a single application, making it indispensable for many users. WeChat's establishment of the super app model has led companies like Meta to try to build similar applications outside of China.

In India, Tata Group has announced that it is currently developing a super app named Tata Neu. Major Indian companies like Paytm, PhonePe, and ITC Maars also have apps in development that might constitute super apps.

In Southeast Asia, Grab and Gojek lay claim to the super app classification despite lacking many of the features offered by WeChat. Accordingly, growth-stage companies like Shopee, Traveloka, and AirAsia have also expanded the range of services offered by their respective applications.

Elon Musk, prior to his acquisition of Twitter, stated that he planned for Twitter to become an "everything app" known as "X"; in 2023, the service added an AI chatbot known as "Grok" as well as integrated job search tools known as "X Hiring". In January 2025, X announced its intent to offer a digital wallet service in the future. Later in the year, X revamped its direct messaging system as "Chat".

== Notable examples ==
=== Alipay ===
Alipay is a third-party mobile and online payment platform established in Hangzhou, China in February 2004 by Alibaba Group and its founder Jack Ma. It operates in association with Ant Group, an affiliate company of the Chinese Alibaba Group.

=== Gojek ===
Gojek is an Indonesian on-demand multiservice digital platform and fintech payment super app. Established in Jakarta in 2010, as a call center to connect consumers to courier delivery and two-wheeled ride-hailing services, it launched its mobile app in 2015 with four services: GoRide, GoSend, GoShop, and GoFood, which has since expanded to offer over 20 services. In 2021, it merged with another Indonesian unicorn, Tokopedia, forming the decacorn GoTo Gojek Tokopedia.

=== Grab ===
Grab is a Southeast Asian technology company headquartered in Singapore and Indonesia. Founded in 2012 as the MyTeksi app in Kuala Lumpur, Malaysia, it expanded the following year as GrabTaxi, before moving its headquarters to Singapore in 2014 and rebranding officially as Grab. In addition to ride-hailing and transportation services, the company's mobile app also offers food delivery and digital payment services.

=== Max ===
Max is a messenger from the Russian company VK, positioned as a super app. The application combines messaging, calls, and channels features with the integration of additional services: payments, miniapps, taxi ordering, deliveries, and other everyday services are available within a single interface. The goal is to unite communication and routine tasks in a unified ecosystem.

=== Tata Neu ===
Tata Neu is a multipurpose super app, developed in India by the Tata Group. It is the country's first super app. The app was launched to coincide with the start of a 2022 Indian Premier League cricket match.

=== WeChat ===
WeChat is a Chinese multipurpose instant messaging, social media and mobile payment app. First released in 2011, it became the world's largest standalone mobile app in 2018, with over 1 billion monthly active users. WeChat provides text messaging, hold-to-talk voice messaging, broadcast (one-to-many) messaging, video conferencing, video games, the sharing of photographs and videos and location sharing.

== Criticism ==
Although apps that fit the super app classification can offer users a wider variety of services in comparison to single-purpose alternatives, internet regulators in regions such as the US and Europe have become more concerned about the overall power of the technology industry and have become more critical of companies developing such apps. In China, WeChat and other local firms have been ordered to open up their platforms to rivals by local regulators.

There are also reports that suggest it might be difficult to replicate WeChat's super app model. This stems partly from the peaking of smartphone penetration rates in many regions worldwide, which has led to overcrowded app stores and tighter restrictions on targeted advertising as regulators assert more control over the companies. From a technical viewpoint, single-purpose apps are comparatively faster, more responsive and easier to navigate than super apps, which helps improve the overall user experience. Super-apps are also likelier to store larger amounts of personal data to facilitate the delivery of their services, so users run a greater risk of becoming victims of severe data breaches. In 2020, this unfolded with Tokopedia, which had the data of 91 million of its users stolen and shared by crackers.

It has also been noted that a user who loses access to their account or is banned from a super app generally loses access to multiple real-life services and digital applications; the Chinese government has used this approach to penalize people who shared the photos of the Sitong Bridge protest.

== See also ==
- Closed platform
