= Law Against Rehabilitation of Nazism =

2014 Russian memory law

Federal Assembly
- Long title: On Amendments to Certain Legislative Acts of the Russian Federation
- Territorial extent: Russia
- Signed by: President Vladimir Putin
- Signed: 5 May 2014

Legislative history
- Introduced by: Irina Yarovaya (YR)
- First reading: 23 April 2014 (State Duma)
- Second reading: 29 April 2014 (Federation Council)

Amends
- Criminal Code of the Russian Federation

Keywords
- Memory laws
- Status: Current legislation

The Federal Law no. 128-FZ of 5 May 2014 "On Amendments to Certain Legislative Acts of the Russian Federation", usually referred to as the Law Against Rehabilitation of Nazism is a Russian memory law of 2014. It also known as Yarovaya Law, after a Russian politician (Irina Yarovaya) who was instrumental in passing it.

The law was originally proposed in 2009. It was approved by the Russian parliament in April 2014, and signed into law by President of Russia Vladimir Putin in May that year.

== Contents ==
The law introduced Article 354.1 to the Criminal Code of the Russian Federation, making it a criminal offense "to deny facts recognized by the international military tribunal that judged and punished the major war criminals of the European Axis countries [this refers to the Nuremberg trials], to approve of the crimes this tribunal judged, and to spread intentionally false information about the Soviet Union’s activities during World War II" as well as "the spreading of information on military and memorial commemorative dates related to Russia’s defense that is clearly disrespectful of society, and to publicly desecrate symbols of Russia’s military glory".

== Applications ==
Shortly after its passage, the law was used to convict Russian blogger Vladimir Luzgin, who compared the September 1939 German invasion of Poland to the Soviet invasion of Poland and referred to the Molotov–Ribbentrop Pact, writing on Russian social media platform VKontakte that "communism and Nazism closely collaborated". Prosecutors accused him of knowingly posting material that may worsen people's view of the Soviet Union, and the court agreed, stating that he had falsified history by stating "that the communists and Germany jointly attacked Poland, unleashing World War Two, or in other words, that Communism and Nazism co-operated honestly". Luzgin was fined 200 thousand rubles (roughly equivalent to US$7,000 in 2025) for "circulation of false information about the activities of the USSR during the years of World War II", though, as was noted by human rights expert Jacob Mchangama, this claim was "essentially, factually correct". In 2016 Lugzin appealed his case to the European Court of Human Rights.

In April 2015, Russian journalist Polina Petruseva was fined 1,000 rubles (US$22) for posting on the social media platform VKontakte a historical picture showing German Nazi troops in Russia, a picture otherwise available from, among others, Wikipedia. That same month, a number of Russian bookstores stopped selling the anti-Nazi graphic novel Maus because of a swastika appearing on its cover design. A toy store selling toy soldiers in wartime German uniforms was also investigated, and a museum displaying anti-Nazi Soviet posters, showing for example crushed swastikas, decided to censor all swastikas on its exhibits.

Works of two British historians, Antony Beevor and John Keegan, were banned in one of Russia's regions as the authorities accused them of being influenced by Nazi propaganda. A month later, another Russian journalist, Sergei Vilkov, was fined 1,000 rubles for posting a caricature on VKontakte (in 2011), which combined the logo of the United Russia and a swastika.

In March 2021 the Duma passed amendments to the law in the Criminal and Administrative Codes that envisage fines of up to 5 million rubles ($68,000) for entities or individuals convicted of the "public dissemination of knowingly false information" about WWII veterans. The changes were proposed after a Russian judge in February 2021 fined jailed opposition politician Alexei Navalny 850,000 rubles ($11,500) for slandering a 94-year-old WWII veteran who had participated in a Kremlin-organized promotional video. The bill was signed by Vladimir Putin in April 2021.

== Criticism ==
The law has been the subject of domestic and international criticism, due to fears of its impact on free speech and historical research. A BBC report in 2017 noted that the law has "curbed...the public discussion of WW2 history". Human Rights Watch report in 2017 noted that "[the law's] selective implementation has so far led to several unjust sentences".

Russian government officials have dismissed these objections, claiming that the law is similar to many other laws known as laws against Holocaust denial, particularly common in Europe. Historian Ivan Kurilla addressed that, saying that while the first European memory laws "were propagated by left-wing political forces aiming to preserve the memory of oppressed groups and the crimes of their states", newer laws, such as the Russian one, are increasingly "backed by pro-state right-wing politicians that seek to create a heroic national narrative and legislate away any doubt about the state’s historical righteousness". Historian Nikolay Koposov wrote that the main goal of the law is "to promote the cult of the Russian state, whose primary incarnation rests in the celebration of the heroic memory of World War II".

== See also ==
- Presidential Commission of the Russian Federation to Counter Attempts to Falsify History to the Detriment of Russia's Interests
- Amendment to the Act on the Institute of National Remembrance
