= Max (app) =

Russian messaging and e-commerce app

Max (Макс)
- Developer: VK
- Release: 26 March 2025; 19 months ago
- Written in: Android: Kotlin; iOS: Swift; Web: TypeScript
- Operating system: Windows, macOS, Android; Discontinued: iOS (2026) (Note: No longer available due to sanctions)
- Available in: 2 languages
- List of languages English, Russian
- Type: Instant messaging client
- License: Proprietary freeware
- Website: max.ru

Max (stylized in all uppercase; Russian: Макс, [ˈmaks] MAKS, from the word "maximum") is a Russian messenger and e-commerce app released by VK in 2025. Comparable to the Chinese platform WeChat, the Max universal mobile application is developed for the purposes of, in addition to providing a social network, allowing access to online government services, verifying identity through a digital ID, electronically signing documents, and making payments. It has been promoted by the Russian government as a "national messenger".

To register in the messenger, a valid mobile phone number from Russia, Belarus, Armenia, Azerbaijan, Kazakhstan, Kyrgyzstan, Moldova, or Uzbekistan is required.

The messenger is managed by Communication Platform LLC, which is a subsidiary of VK. As of September 2025, the Max app is required to be pre-installed on all smartphones sold in Russia, while the Russian communications regulator Roskomnadzor imposes restrictions on the use of other messenger applications.

== History ==
In May 2022, a VK messenger app was released, with ambitions to create a more user-friendly super application for Russian users, but struggled to gain audience versus already used foreign messaging software.

In 2024, the VK company began developing a new messenger. On 25 March 2025, VK representatives told Vedomosti about the development of a beta version of Max, outlining the messaging features, built-in payment systems for VTB Bank and Alfa-Bank and business tools for creating mini-apps and chatbots. The messenger was positioned to be independent from the VK app. A beta build of the mobile app became available for download the following day.

On 4 June 2025, at a meeting between Vladimir Putin and members of the Russian Government, Minister of Digital Development Maksut Shadaev stated that Max is planned to be developed into an official national Russian messenger, similar to national messengers of other countries, naming Line (Japan), KakaoTalk (South Korea), Zalo (Vietnam) and WeChat (China) as examples.

On 24 June 2025, the federal law "On the creation of a multifunctional information exchange service" was published, requiring Max to come pre-installed on officially released mobile devices in Russia after 1 September. On 25 June, senator Olga Yepifanova announced that Gosuslugi is going to be integrated in Max. In June, the VK company announced a bug bounty program with a 5,000,000 ₽ (~US$62,000) reward for reporting security exploits in the app.

On 15 July 2025, the app was promoted by the Russian government as the "national messenger".

On 30 July 2025, St. Petersburg State University became the first educational institution to implement Max officially. As of September 2025, the Max app has been pre-installed on all smartphones sold in Russia, while the Russian communications regulator Roskomnadzor is imposing restrictions of the use of WhatsApp and Telegram.

On 16 March 2026, English language support was added to the application.

On 30 April 2026, Cloudflare labeled the domain Max.ru which is associated with the Max app as spyware. Max's press office stated that Cloudflare's classification stemmed from a misinterpretation of request headers sent to standard web analytics services, not from any analysis of the app's code. One day later, on 1 May 2026, Cloudflare removed the label on Max.ru.

On 3 June 2026, Max has vanished from the Apple App Store. Apple cited sanctions as the reason.

On 9 June 2026, Max became unavailable in the Huawei AppGallery, being hidden from users from all countries except Russia.

On 13 July 2026 the Council of the European Union decided to impose restrictive measures on VK (including Communication Platform) responsible for developing and managing Max App.

== Security and privacy issues ==
The Max messenger, associated with VK and integrated with Russian government services such as Gosuslugi, has faced criticism over its handling of user data and choice of technical components. Reports indicate that the application collects and stores user metadata, including IP addresses, contact lists, and activity timestamps, with its privacy policy allowing potential transfer of this data to third parties, including state authorities. It has also been noted that the software incorporates multiple third-party open-source libraries originating from countries officially designated by Russia as "unfriendly", and that some telemetry traffic is directed to foreign servers.

Security researchers have also documented social-engineering schemes targeting MAX users. In these cases, attackers impersonate technical support staff and offer "activation of protection" services, attempting to trick victims into revealing SMS verification codes. Such codes can then be used to gain unauthorized access to linked accounts on government service portals.

Meanwhile, a joint hacking team formed by Ukraine and the United Kingdom also infiltrated this software in an attempt to extract critical information from it, or disrupt and interfere with transactions.

Under Russian law Max is legally required to integrate with SORM, and is also intended and designed to centralize digital communications in Russia. It has been noted that platform would give the Federal Security Service of Russia and in effect the Russian government major backdoor access to private conversations, financial transactions, and geolocation data of Russian users of the app.

After Telegram was banned, Moscow attempted to promote the app's use within the military, but officers resisted the move because they did not want the Federal Security Service to monitor their communications.

In September 2026, security researchers from InterSecLab have published an extensive technical analysis of surveillance and control features within the Max app, including and reviewing previous analysis work. Core findings include that Max uses a proprietary binary protocol for its network traffic (instead of HTTPS, for example) that is based on GOST TLS cryptography. This proprietary protocol also includes a telemetry command containing information about the user's network environment such as VPN usage, IP address (as probed with six different IP lookup services), mobile carrier and reachability of certain domains. The latter theoretically provides a measurement opportunity for VK to assess if censorship restrictions are being complied with. Furthermore, the app includes an on-device ML model that reacts to certain keywords spoken in calls (in the app version 26.12.0, this was the phrase "I cannot hear"), supposedly to monitor connectivity issues.

== Features ==
As of June 2025, Max features include personal and group chat, voice messaging, calls, video calling, transferring files up to 4 gigabytes, stickers, emoji, tools for creating chatbots and mini-apps, and a neural network called GigaChat. The messenger has implemented the ability to transfer money between users via the Faster Payment System of the Bank of Russia. Some of its features are designed specifically for the workplace, such as corporate mail with an integrated calendar and contacts, as well as audio conferences, meeting planning tools, task management, and editing cloud documents online.

== Availability ==
=== Countries ===
Countries with access to Max

On launch, registration was available to phone numbers from Russia and Belarus. On 5 November 2025, registration was expanded to all countries of the Commonwealth of Independent States.

On 5 March 2026, it was reported that registration had expanded to 40 countries, namely Abkhazia, Afghanistan, Armenia, Azerbaijan, Belarus, Bolivia, Cambodia, Colombia, Cuba, Republic of the Congo, Democratic Republic of the Congo, Gambia, Georgia, Grenada, India, Indonesia, Iraq, Kazakhstan, Kuwait, Kyrgyzstan, Laos, Lebanon, Malaysia, Moldova, Myanmar, Nicaragua, Pakistan, Palau, Qatar, Russia, Saint Kitts and Nevis, Saudi Arabia, South Ossetia, Tajikistan, Tanzania, Thailand, Transnistria, Turkey, Turkmenistan, United Arab Emirates, Uzbekistan, Venezuela and Vietnam.

== Usage ==
=== 2025 ===
In June 2025, the number of new Max messenger user accounts reached 1 million; by July, this figure more than doubled.

In October, VK announced that the number of registered Max users had exceeded 40 million, with 500 million calls and 2 billion messages having been sent to date. As of 27 October there are 50 million registered users.

In November, the number of messenger users reached 55 million people. In December, the messenger's audience was 75 million users.

=== 2026 ===
In March, VK announced that the number of registered users had exceeded 100 million. The average daily audience reach is 70.5 million people.

It is worth noting that the only source of information about the number of users is the VK press service, whose data may be overstated or unreliable. The Guardian, a British newspaper, noted that while the use of Max has been promoted to everyday Russians, the Russian elite usage of Max was "performative", noting that many Russian officials carry separate phones with Max on while continuing to use Telegram and Signal for communication. The Guardian also notes that Telegram still maintains a major source of news for most Russians.

== Technical details ==
Max messenger is written in Node.js, Kotlin, Swift, Objective-C, TypeScript, C++ and Java. It works on the Windows, macOS, Android and iOS operating systems. In addition to the mobile application, the messenger is available as a web application (web.max.ru) and a desktop client.

According to research of the source code, the messenger borrows code fragments from the previous VK messenger TamTam.
