= Sovereign Internet Law =

2019 amendments to Russian Internet legislation

The Sovereign Internet Law (Russian: Закон о «суверенном интернете») is the informal name for a set of 2019 amendments to existing Russian legislation that mandate Internet surveillance and grants the Russian government powers to partition Russia from the rest of the Internet, including the creation of a national fork of the Domain Name System.

In a statement released by the State Legal Department on March 13, 2019, the federal law was aimed at "suppressing the dissemination of unreliable socially significant information under the guise of reliable messages that creates a threat of harm to the life and (or) health of citizens, property, a threat of massive disruption of public order and (or) public safety, or a threat of interfering with the functioning or termination of the functioning of facilities life support, transport or social infrastructure, credit institutions, energy facilities, industry and communications."

The system was tested on 6 July 2023, and possibly tested again on February 27, 2024. On December 10, 2024, the system got tested for a whole day in the Chechnya region.

== See also ==
- Alternative DNS root
- Internet censorship in Russia
- Mass surveillance in Russia
- Splinternet
- Yarovaya's Law
