= Alexander Tsesis =

American constitutional scholar

Alexander Tsesis is an American constitutional scholar who holds D'Alemberte chair in constitutional law at the Florida State University College of Law. Prior to arriving at Florida State University, he held the Raymond & Mary Simon Chair in Constitutional Law at Loyola University and was a Visiting Professor of Law at George Washington University Law School from 2021 to 2023.

Alexander Tsesis is currently the general editor of the Cambridge Studies on Civil Rights and Civil Liberties and the Oxford Theoretical Foundations in Law.

== Works ==
- Tsesis, Alexander (2002). Destructive Messages: How Hate Speech Paves the Way For Harmful Social Movements. NYU Press. ISBN 978-0-8147-8272-9.
- Tsesis, Alexander (2004). The Thirteenth Amendment and American Freedom: A Legal History. NYU Press. ISBN 978-0-8147-8276-7.
- Tsesis, Alexander (2008). We Shall Overcome: A History of Civil Rights and the Law. Yale University Press. ISBN 978-0-300-14531-1.
- Tsesis, Alexander, ed. (2010). The Promises of Liberty: The History and Contemporary Relevance of the Thirteenth Amendment. Columbia University Press. ISBN 978-0-231-14144-4.
- Tsesis, Alexander (2012). For Liberty and Equality: The Life and Times of the Declaration of Independence. Oxford University Press. ISBN 978-0-19-994257-2.
- Tsesis, Alexander (2017). Constitutional Ethos: Liberal Equality for the Common Good. Oxford University Press. ISBN 978-0-19-935984-4.
- Tsesis, Alexander (2020). Free Speech in the Balance. Cambridge University Press. ISBN 978-1-108-42400-4.
