= Irina Yarovaya =

Russian jurist and politician (born 1966)

Irina Yarovaya MP
- Ирина Яровая
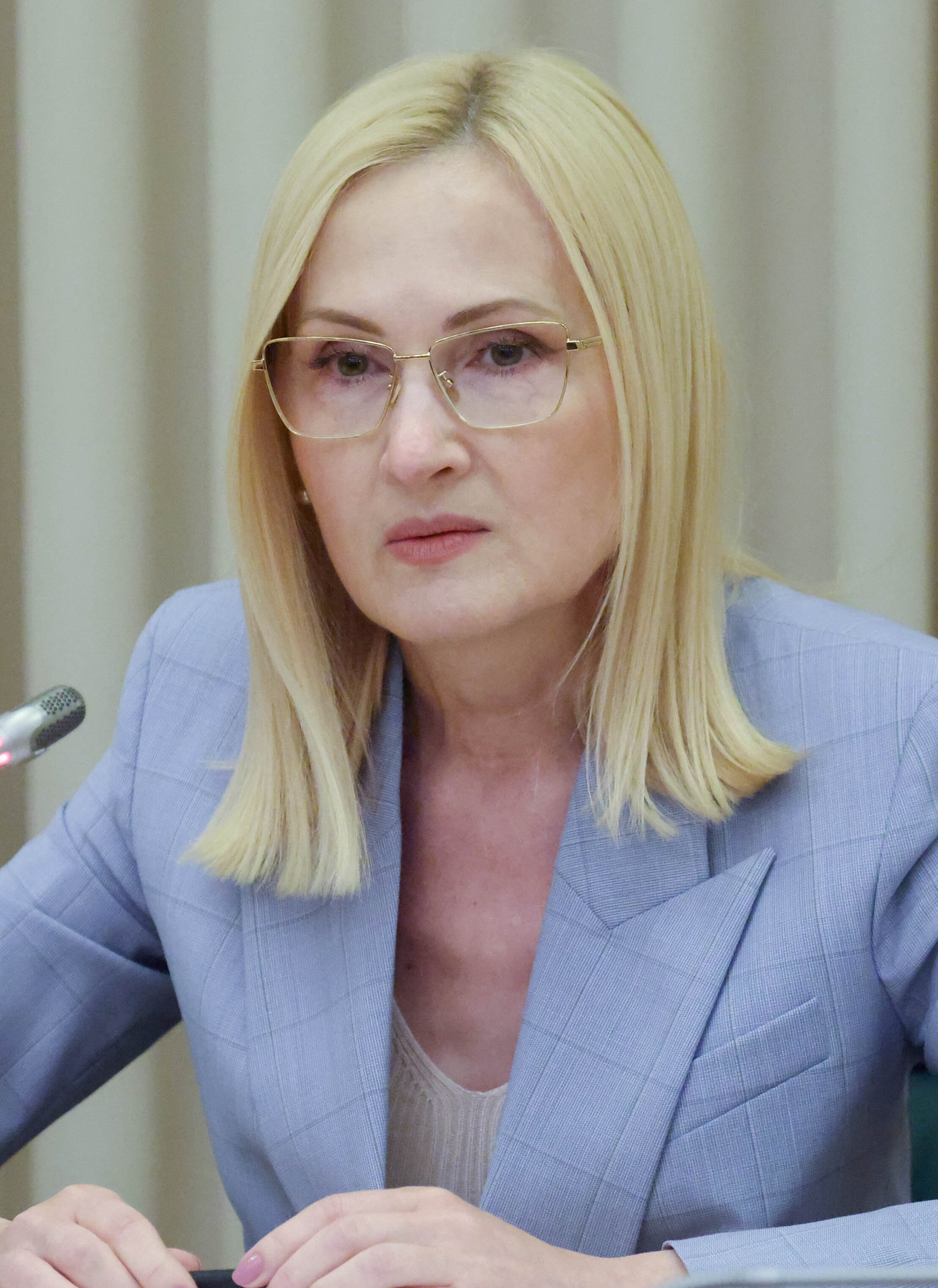
- Yarovaya in 2025

Deputy Chairman of the State Duma
- Incumbent
- Assumed office 5 October 2016

Member of the State Duma for Kamchatka
- Incumbent
- Assumed office 12 October 2021
- Preceded by: Konstantin Slyshchenko
- Constituency: Kamchatka-at-large (No. 45)

Member of the State Duma (Party List Seat)
- In office 24 December 2007 – 12 October 2021

Personal details
- Born: Irina Anatoleyvna Chernyakhovskaya; 17 October 1966 (age 60) Makiivka, Donetsk Oblast, Ukrainian SSR, Soviet Union
- Party: United Russia
- Other political affiliations: Yabloko (1997–2007)

Irina Anatolyevna Yarovaya (Russian: Ирина Анатольевна Яровая; née Chernyakhovskaya; born 17 October 1966) is a Russian politician, who's serving as a Deputy Chairman of the State Duma from the United Russia Party and as a member of her party's General Council.

She has authored or co-authored multiple laws, including the toughening of responsibility for violating the rules of holding rallies, tightening immigration, criminal libel and registration requirements for 'foreign agents' for non-profit organizations with foreign funding. In 2014, she sponsored a bill prohibiting rehabilitation of Nazism. Another law known as the Yarovaya Law required in particular that telecommunications providers record all of their traffic and keep the record for three years (later shortened to six months). The first version of this counter-terrorism bill would have made it a criminal offense to fail reporting suspicious activities potentially linked with terrorism. This bill's language was subsequently watered down by the Duma.

Yarovaya is generally considered a reactionary, in that she sponsored laws limiting civil freedom in the name of state security. She was accused of producing low-quality bills possibly contradicting the Constitution of Russia.

== Political biography ==
From 1997 to 2007, she was a member in Yabloko Party, and was elected to the Council of People's Deputies of Kamchatka Oblast, where she served as head of the Kamchatka Regional Council, member of her party's Central Bureau and Vice-Chairman of her party.

She was elected to the 5th (2007) as well as the 6th (2011) and the 7th State Duma of the Russian Federation (2016). On 21 December 2011 she became the Head of the Parliamentary Committee for Security and Anti-Corruption.

On 27 June 2016 she was included in the election list of the United Russia Party as a frontrunner in the Far East region, which virtually guaranteed her being elected to the 7th State Duma in September 2016.

=== Sanctions ===
She was sanctioned by the UK government on 11 March 2022 in relation to the Russo-Ukrainian War.
