= Advmaker =

Russian advertising network website

- Website type: Advertising network
- Available in: Russian, English
- Website: advmaker.net
- Commercial: Yes
- Registration: Required
- Launched: 2008; 18 years ago
- Current status: Active

Advmaker is an affiliate program for internet advertising in Runet. It features approximately 17,000 advertising spaces, reaching over 100 million visitors and generating three billion page views per month. The program is designed for webmasters and site owners seeking to place advertisements on their web projects, as well as for advertisers.

== History ==
Advmaker, an advertising network, was founded in April 2008. By the following year, it ranked among the top 50 websites in Russia (23rd place), Ukraine (28th place), Belarus (32nd place), and Kazakhstan (25th place). In 2010, according to a published Google ranking, the company was listed among the top 1,000 websites worldwide.

In 2014, Advmaker participated in the second annual RACE Awards 2014, competing in the category of "Breakthrough of the Year in the Lead Generation Market". Additionally, on October 3–4, 2014, the company served as the Wi-Fi sponsor for the marketing and affiliate programs exhibition Russian Affiliate Congress & Expo (RACE).

In 2015, according to the analytical research project Ruward: Track, the company ranked first among the eight major players in the Russian internet banner network market. The ranked networks included Advmaker, Kadam, ADSkape, Post Banners, Propeller Ads, AdForse, and Traffic.ru.

== Requirements for webmasters ==
Before being added to the network, all websites undergo moderation. Website owners participating in Advmaker earn income through clicks or impressions, with payments issued once a month.

Any site that complies with applicable laws and targets a Russian-speaking audience can join the advertising network, provided it meets the following criteria:

- A minimum of 500 unique visitors per day
- An average of more than three visits per visitor
- Russian traffic accounting for over 50% of total traffic

Additionally, websites hosted on free platforms such as Narod.ru or Ucoz are eligible to join Advmaker. The network also offers a referral system, and scheduled payments are made twice a month.

== Requirements for advertisers ==
The minimum advertising budget required is 5,000 rubles. Websites participating in the network must meet the following conditions:

- No pop-under (click-under) ads
- No erotic materials, viruses, or malicious scripts
- Unique content
- Not hosted on a free hosting service

== Types of advertising ==
- Clickunder
- Slide banners
- Web banner
- Top Scroll
- Preloader banners
- Video banners
- Mobile redirect
- Branding

== Clients ==
Major companies such as Yandex, mail.ru, Google, Lingualeo, Svyaznoy, and MeGoGo cooperate with Advmaker. The company has also been bootstrapping online games for over six years, collaborating with notable developers including Wargaming, Panzar, Zzima.com, Bigpoint, Nival, and Gaijin Entertainment, among others.

According to statistics, in 2013, Advmaker attracted 4,217,515 players for its 20 largest clients. In 2014, the company aimed to attract more than six million players. Advmaker covers approximately 10% of the online gaming market in Russia.
