= Constructor University =

Research university in Bremen, Germany

Coordinates: 53°10′N 8°39′E

- Other names: CU Bremen, CU
- Former names: International University Bremen (1999 to 2007), Jacobs University Bremen (2007 to 2022)
- Motto: Knowledge through science
- Type: Private, Research, Coeducational higher education institution
- Established: 1999; 27 years ago
- Chairman: Serg Bell
- Students: 1750
- Location: Bremen, State of Bremen, Germany
- Campus: Suburban 80 acres (0.32 km^{2})
- Language of Instruction: English
- Website: constructor.university

Constructor University, formerly Jacobs University Bremen, is an international, private, residential research university located in Vegesack, Bremen, Germany. It offers study programs in engineering, humanities, natural and social sciences, in which students can acquire bachelor's, master's or doctorate degrees.

Most of the instruction at the university is in English. Constructor University's students come from more than 110 countries, with about 80% foreign students and approximately 33% international faculty members.

== History ==
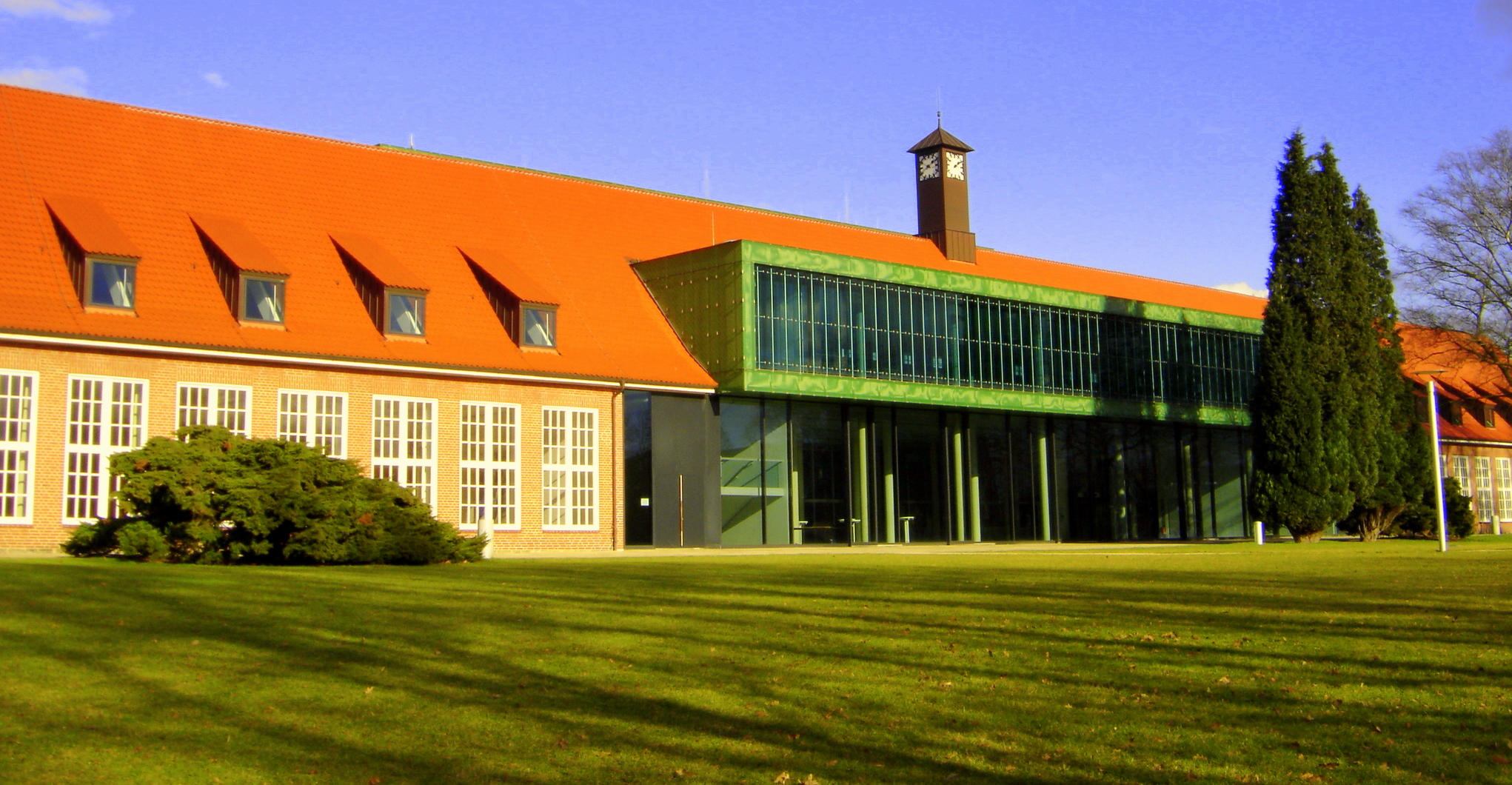
Constructor University Bremen Campus Center

Constructor University (previously called both Jacobs University and International University Bremen until 2007) was founded in 1999 with the support of the University of Bremen, Rice University in Houston, Texas, and the Free Hanseatic City of Bremen, with study programs beginning in 2001. The Jacobs Foundation invested €200 million in the institution in November 2006, thus taking over a two-thirds majority of the partnership share. At the beginning of 2007, the university changed its name to Jacobs University Bremen. In November 2022 it changed its name to Constructor University.

The campus is located on the site of the former Roland Barracks in Bremen-Grohn. The site was erected in 1938 during the National Socialist period. After the Second World War, it was transformed into a displaced-persons camp by the International Refugee Organization under the management of the American forces base known as Camp Grohn. Shortly after the formation of the Bundeswehr, Camp Grohn was passed into the responsibility of the German government in 1955 and renamed Roland Kaserne. Roland Kaserne housed a Bundeswehr logistics school during the Cold War. In 1999, the military base was inactivated, making way for the university.

The approximately 34-hectare site of the campus university is home to four residential colleges, buildings for administration, lecturing and research, an Information Resource Center (IRC) with a library and digital resources, sport, leisure and park facilities.

== Financing ==
The financing of Constructor University has been the subject of controversy, especially in Bremen. For a long time, the university generated income from various sources such as tuition fees, donations, third-party funding and grants from the Jacobs Foundation. Funding from the state of Bremen, amounting to three million euros annually, expired in 2017.

In June 2018, the Jacobs Foundation decided to support the private university with a maximum of another 100 million Swiss francs until 2027. Also in June 2018, the city of Bremen decided that it would take over a loan from the university's founding phase.

In the summer of 2020, the Jacobs Foundation announced its withdrawal from funding. The foundation's majority shares were transferred to the Verein zur Förderung der wissenschaftlichen Forschung in Bremen e.V.

In September 2021, the Bremen Senate approved the sale of Bremen's shares to the Schaffhausen Institute of Technology (SIT). The new majority owner plans to invest 50 million euros in Jacobs University, half of which by the end of 2024. In November 2022 SIT changed its name to Constructor Group.

== Organization ==
The university is managed by a not-for-profit company Constructor University Bremen gGmbH. In line with the statutes, it is composed of four organs: the councilors, the board of trustees, the board of governors and the executive board, which comprises the managing director and the president. The board of governors is the central decision-making committee for all the fundamental questions of the university's development, including the appointment of the president and the professors. Christian Jacobs, the eldest son of the entrepreneur and patron Klaus J. Jacobs (1936–2008), is a member of the board of trustees of the Jacobs Foundation.

=== University leadership ===
- Sir Konstantin Novoselov, President (since February 2026)
- Stanislav Protasov, President (March 2023 – February 2026)
- Fabio Pammolli, President (January – December 2022)
- Andrea Herzig‑Erler (Managing Director 2020 – 2022) and Thomas Auf der Heyde (Managing Director since 2020)
- Antonio Loprieno, President 2019 – 2020
- Michael Hülsmann, President 2018 – 2019
- Katja Windt, President 2014 – 2018
- Heinz‑Otto Peitgen, President 2013 – 2014
- Joachim Treusch, President 2006 – 2012
- Fritz Schaumann, President 1999 – 2006

=== Board of Governors ===
Sources:

- Serguei Beloussov, founder and chairman of the Schaffhausen Institute of Technology (Chairman of the board of governors).
- Philipp Rösler, former vice chancellor of the Federal Republic of Germany and member of the supervisory board of various listed companies (deputy chairman of the board of governors).
- Jochen Berger, founder, entrepreneur and investor.
- Mark Kamlet, professor of economics and public policy at Heinz College, Carnegie Mellon University, USA.
- Rafael Laguna de la Vera, software entrepreneur, director of the Federal Agency for Leap Innovations SPRIND.
- Elena Novoselova, vice president of communications and grant management at SIT.
- Sascha Spoun, president of Leuphana University Lüneburg.
- Matthias Winter, McKinsey & Company, senior partner in Zurich.
- Ilya Zubarev, software entrepreneur and co-founder of Acronis, Runa Capital and numerous other companies.
- Rainer Köttgen, chairman of the board of the Reimar Lüst Foundation and former state councillor at the Bremen Senator for Education and Science.
- Stefan Rustler, president of the Jacobs University Bremen Alumni Association.
- Antje Boetius, director of the Alfred Wegener Institute, Helmholtz Centre for Polar and Marine Research, Bremerhaven.
- "Tim Cordßen-Ryglewski"., former Bremen State Councilor to the Senator for Science and Ports of the Free Hanseatic City of Bremen.
- Dorothee Dzwonnek, former state secretary and secretary general of the German Research Foundation (DFG) from 2007–2018.
- Gerold Wefer, founder and former director of the MARUM Center for Marine Environmental Sciences Bremen.
- Jürgen Zöllner, chairman of the Charité Foundation Berlin and former chairman of the board of governors.
- Peter Lürßen, managing director of Fr. Lürssen Werft.

=== Constructor Group (majority shareholder) ===
Constructor Group, previously known as the Schaffhausen Institute of Technology, abbreviated SIT, is a private non-profit institute in Switzerland founded in 2019 by entrepreneur Serg Bell. The institute focuses on computer science, physics and digital transformation. Its partners are Carnegie Mellon University and the School of Computing at the National University of Singapore.

The development of the institute was funded by the Canton of Schaffhausen with 3 million Swiss francs.

The academic focus is led by 2010 Nobel Prize winner in physics Konstantin Novoselov.

== Study programs ==
Constructor University offers bachelor's, master's, and doctoral programs, as well as a preparatory program. From the first semester, students are involved in their professors' research projects. The university sees itself as a melting pot of cultures, ideas, and perspectives and aims to create a safe and attractive learning environment. From counseling and intercultural services, job and career services, German courses, and club activities, to campus life offerings, students have access to numerous resources.

At Constructor University, both teaching and research are organized into three thematic areas of focus, comparable to faculties at other German universities.

1. Mobility: Understanding the global movement of people, goods, and information.
2. Health: developing solutions for a healthier world.
3. Diversity: Deciphering a modern, global world.

Both undergraduate and graduate programs are offered in these Focus Areas. In addition, the university offers a college preparatory program. Its purpose is to help students decide on their future study path and meet international admission criteria. The language of instruction is English. The degree programs are practice-oriented. Students are involved in the research work of their professors from the first semester onwards, and in the fifth semester, there is the possibility of a stay abroad.

The program can be completed with the academic degrees Bachelor of Arts, Bachelor of Science, Master of Arts, Master of Science, Executive Master / Master of Business Administration and Doctor of Philosophy (Ph. D.). Tuition fees for a bachelor's or master's degree program are around €20,000 per academic year. Additional costs are incurred for room and board. A system of scholarships and loans is designed to ensure that all admitted applicants to bachelor's programs can begin their studies. Following the motto "Study now, pay later," Constructor University offers a financing model for tuition fees together with the Brain Capital education fund.

=== Bachelor's degree programs ===
- Industrial Engineering & Management (BSc)
- Mathematics (BSc)
- Computer Science (BSc)
- Electrical and Computer Engineering (BSc)
- Robotics and Intelligent Systems (BSc)
- Biochemistry and Cell Biology (BSc)
- Chemistry and Biotechnology (BSc)
- Medicinal Chemistry and Chemical Biology (BSc)
- Earth and Environmental Sciences (BSc)
- Physics (BSc)
- Global Economics and Management (BA)
- International Business Administration (BA)
- Society, Media and Politics (BA)
- International Relations: Politics and History (BA)
- Integrated Social and Cognitive Psychology (BSc)

=== Graduate programs ===
- Data Science for Society and Business (MSc)
- Data Engineering (MSc)
- Supply Chain Management (MSc)
- Psychology (MSc) (bilingual: German / English)
- International Relations (MA)

There are two different approaches to earning a PhD degree at Constructor University:

- Individual, research-oriented degrees and structured PhD programs such as the Bremen International School of Social Sciences (BIGSSS), which is offered in cooperation with the University of Bremen.
- In addition, Constructor University is affiliated with the Max Planck Institute for Marine Microbiology and the Alfred Wegener Institute (Helmholtz Centre for Polar and Marine Research – AWI) through the graduate program Marine Microbiology (MarMic).

=== Preparation Program: Foundation Year ===
The academic preparation program, the International Foundation Year, provides tailored academic and personal support for individual development and prepares participants for the challenges of university-level study. In addition to building your academic knowledge and skills, the program builds self-confidence and teaches important lifelong social, professional and personal skills.

== Student body ==
Currently, more than 1,600 students from over 110 nations are matriculated at the university (status as of December 2022). Most students come from Germany (16.1%), followed by India (7.2%), Nepal (7.0%), USA (5.0%), Albania (4.4%), Pakistan (4.2%), Morocco (3.5%), China (3.1%), Ethiopia (2.3%) and South Korea (2.1%). Programs with a total of 120 international partners foster the international atmosphere.

Overseen by resident mentors, the vast majority of students live on campus in one of four colleges. They pursue their sporting, social, political or cultural interests in more than 50 student clubs. Constructor students organize a number of recurring events on campus such as conferences, culture information days, sports competitions and art exhibitions.

Constructor University has two groups of student government: the Undergraduate Student Government (USG) and the Graduate Student Association (GSA), representing the undergraduate and graduate student body, respectively.

== Research ==
There are currently 4 functional research facilities in the university's campus. In 2017, each professor raised an average of 205,900 euros in third-party funding.[BM1] Research projects at Constructor University are funded by the German Research Foundation, by the European Union's Framework Program for Research and Innovation, or by companies.

== Rankings ==
University rankings

Overall – Global & National
THE World 2024	401–500	37–41

In the Times Higher Education World University Rankings of 2024, the university is placed at 401–500 globally and 37–41 within the country.

In 2021, Constructor University ranked 27th in a comparison of 475 universities worldwide that are younger than 50. Constructor is steadily improving in the nationwide comparison, reaching 2nd place in 2021. In the categories "Teaching" and "Internationality" it reaches first place in 2021[BM2] .

Constructor University is one of the most popular universities among researchers from abroad and ranks seventh among the more than 80 universities evaluated in a Germany-wide comparison. The ranking is based on the number of guest stays by top international and junior researchers who have conducted research in Germany as fellows or award winners of the Alexander von Humboldt Foundation in the past five years.

== Partnerships ==
The university closely cooperates with many local and international partners, including students exchange, faculty mobility, joint programs, and research collaborations. The partners include world-renowned institutions, such as:

- North America (now US only):

Carnegie Mellon University
Rice University
New York University
University of Pennsylvania
Cornell University
Case Western Reserve University
University of Notre Dame

- Europe:

University of Edinburgh, UK
University of Warwick, UK
University of Groningen, The Netherlands
Sciences Po, France
Uppsala University, Sweden
University of Oslo, Norway
St. Petersburg State University, Russia

- Germany:

Alfred Wegener Institute for Polar and Marine Research (AWI), Bremen
Max Planck Institute (MPI) for Marine Microbiology, Bremen
University of Bremen

- Asia (Far & Middle East):

Technion – Israel Institute of Technology, Israel
Hebrew University of Jerusalem
Ritsumeikan University, Japan
University of Nottingham Ningbo, China
Fudan University, Shanghai, China

== Alumni Association ==
The Jacobs University Alumni Association was founded in 2004. It has around 2000 members; the percentage of new graduates that join the association is approximately 70%. In 2008, a limited company was founded as Jacobs University Bremen Alumni & Friends GmbH, laying the legal foundations to give the alumni a say in the university's development. The limited company, which is 99-percent owned by the Alumni Association, with one percent owned by the university, is one of the three shareholders in Constructor University and owns a sixth of the shares in the school. The president of the Alumni Association is also a member of the board of governors, thus taking a very active role in shaping the future of the institution.

== Categorization of the study model ==
Constructor University has combined features of typical US and German higher education institutions.

US universities can be public or private and typically offer 4-year undergraduate programs. They charge high annual tuition fees and provide accommodation for students to live on campus. In contrast, most German universities are public and offer 3-year undergraduate programs in accordance with the Bologna Process. The majority of German universities does not charge tuition fees, but only collect a small service fee. Dormitories and meals are managed by Studentenwerk, a municipal student service organization independent of universities. Constructor, as a private university, offers 3-year undergraduate programs with less expensive tuition fees and provides accommodation on the residential campus for its student.

A typical 4-year US program includes physical education, requiring students to take around four to five courses per semester. Like German universities, Constructor's 3-year undergraduate program offers athletics in the form of extracurricular activities. The average 30 ECTS per semester include more than 6 courses of soft skills training (e.g. language courses as additional competencies). Constructor University also provides career advising.

The admission process of Constructor University follows the US-American system.

== Cooperation with businesses ==
Constructor University offers companies various opportunities for cooperation, which include long-term research collaborations, the provision of scientific services as part of short-term research and development projects, or training of junior and managerial staff.

== Cyber Security Incident ==
In February 6, 2024, Constructor University grappled with a cyber security breach, resulting in a week-long campus-wide internet blackout. While no data compromise was reported, functionality was only partially restored by late March. The incident's impact extended to essential services like the meal plan system, highlighting the crucial role of robust cyber security protocols in safeguarding educational institutions.
