= Telecommunications in Kazakhstan =

Telecommunications in Kazakhstan include radio, television, fixed and mobile telephones, and the internet.

The largest telecommunications company in Kazakhstan is Kazakhtelecom, which is responsible for infrastructure, such as cables and exchanges, and provides internet, television and telephone connections to individuals and businesses. The state of Kazakhstan is a major shareholder in Kazakhtelecom.

== Telephones ==
=== Telephone numbers ===
Kazakhstan's international calling code is +7, it is used in combination with the zone codes 6xx and 7xx. It is the only former Soviet country, except Russia, not yet to have transitioned away from +7, however, there were attempts to switch telephone code. In 2021, the number +997 was allocated by the ITU, and was set in motion to be activated in 2023. However, in early 2023, the country applied instead for the number +77 before finally deciding to keep +7.

Telephone numbers, both fixed and mobile, are 10 digits long.

Kazakhstan's telephone numbering system is structured with zone codes 6xx for fixed-line services and 7xx for mobile phone services. The country has several major telecom providers offering services ranging from fixed-line telephony to mobile and internet packages. The introduction of mobile number portability (MNP) has increased competition among operators by allowing users to switch carriers without changing their phone numbers.

Efforts to improve telecommunications infrastructure have led to expanded 4G coverage in urban areas, with pilot projects for 5G networks being tested in cities such as Almaty, Astana, and Shymkent. Government initiatives also aim to improve connectivity in rural and remote areas as part of a national push to bridge the digital divide.

=== Fixed-line ===
Telephone density of fixed telephone subscriptions is decreasing, standing at 16 per 100 people in 2021, compared to its peak of 26 per 100 in 2012.

=== Mobile ===
As of 2021, there were estimated to be over 24 million cellular subscriptions; 127 per 100 inhabitants of Kazakhstan.

Rank	Operator	Technology	Subscribers (in millions)	Ownership
1	Beeline (including izi)	GSM-900 MHz (GPRS, EDGE); 900/2100 MHz UMTS, HSDPA, HSUPA, HSPA, HSPA+, DC-HSPA+ 800/1800/2100 MHz LTE, LTE-A n78 5G NR	9.8 (October 2021)	VEON
2	Kcell (including activ)	GSM-900 MHz (GPRS, EDGE); 900/2100 MHz UMTS, HSDPA, HSUPA, HSPA, HSPA+, DC-HSPA+ 800/1800/2100 MHz LTE, LTE-A	7.957 (Sep 2021)	KazakhTelecom (51%), Jysan Bank (24%), free float (25%)
3	Tele2 Kazakhstan (including Altel, Fmobile)	GSM-900 MHz (GPRS, EDGE); 900 MHz UMTS, HSDPA, HSUPA, HSPA, HSPA+, DC-HSPA+ 1800 MHz LTE, LTE-A n78 5G NR	7.255 (Dec 2019)	KazakhTelecom

Kazakhstan has 4G mobile internet and has begun work on 5G as of 2021.

=== Satellite ===
Kazakhstan's national DAMA satellite communication network was established in 1999 in order to provide communication services to sparsely populated areas with poor road access.

== Broadcast transmission ==
- Radio broadcast stations: AM 60, FM 17, shortwave 9 (1998)
- Radios: 6.47 million (1997); 12 million (2009);
- Television broadcast stations: 12 (plus 9 repeaters) (1998); 149 (2009);

In February 2021, Almaty completed its switchover from analog to digital television broadcasting.

== Internet ==
- Top level domain (country code): .kz
- Internet Service Providers (ISPs): 10 (with their own international channels) (2001); 22 (2009);
- Internet hosts: 33,217 (2007); 80,000 (2009);
- Internet users: 100,000 (2002); 400,000 (2005); 1,247,000 (2006); 3,130,000 (2008); 4,700,000 (2009); 15,160,000 (2019)

It is estimated that as of 2021, 91% of Kazakhstan residents have access to the internet.

In 2023, Kazakhstan will begin the construction on the joint Trans Caspian Fiber Optic (TCFO) project.

The government of Kazakhstan carries out surveillance of telecommunications and internet traffic in the country and, as of 2010, was found to filter content related to social and political issues, as well as preparing twice per year a list of websites to be blocked. ISPs are required to prohibit users from disseminating materials or information not in accordance with the country’s laws, including pornography. Since 2015, it is an imprisonable offense to spread unverified information online. Kazakhstan has also throttled or shut down the internet as a response to political dissent, such as during country-wide political unrest in January 2022.

== Key developments ==
In December 2022, Kcell and Tele2-Altel, both major Kazakhstani mobile network operators (MNOs), launched limited 5G services in the country following their successful acquisition of 5G spectrum licenses. This marked the beginning of the 5G era in Kazakhstan.

The two companies have ambitious plans to expand their 5G network infrastructure, aiming to deploy at least 7,000 5G base stations and achieve 80% population coverage by the end of 2027.

== See also ==
- Kazakhtelecom
- Kaznet
- Kazpost
- .kz
