= John Zanni =

- Born: June 20, 1962 (age 64); Santa Monica, California USA
- Education: California State University, Northridge
- Occupation: CEO at Acronis SCS

John Zanni (born June 20, 1962) is an American technology executive and entrepreneur best known for founding Easy Reserve Study, an AI-powered platform for long-term capital and maintenance planning.

He is also the former President of Acronis SCS, a U.S. based cybersecurity company that provides secure data protection solutions for public sector organizations.

Prior to becoming Acronis SCS CEO, Zanni held various leadership and management positions at Acronis, Parallels, and Microsoft.

== Early life and education ==
Zanni was born in Santa Monica, California. Before entering the technology industry, he spent 13 years working in his family's French restaurant Le Rendezvous, in Newbury Park, California, one of the early modern wine bars in Southern California.

He earned a B.S. in physics from California State University, Northridge (CSUN). His early exposure to technology—including self-teaching Excel and writing a custom backup system for the restaurant—helped him transition into the tech sector.

== Career ==
=== 1994–2010: Microsoft ===
Zanni joined Microsoft in 1994, where he spent 16 years in a variety of business development and leadership roles, including General Manager for Worldwide Hosting and Cloud Industry.

=== 2010–2013: Parallels ===
From 2010 to 2014, Zanni held executive roles at Parallels, Inc., including Vice President of Service Provider Marketing and Alliances and later Chief Marketing Officer.

=== 2014–2025: Acronis ===
Zanni joined Acronis in 2014 as Senior Vice President of Cloud and Hosting Sales, later serving as Chief Marketing Officer and Senior Vice President of Channel and Cloud Strategy. In 2017, he became President of Acronis and, in 2018, was appointed president and CEO of Acronis SCS, a U.S. subsidiary dedicated to secure data protection for public sector agencies.

During this period, Acronis SCS achieved several key U.S. government certifications and attestations, including:

- FIPS 140–2
- DoD Approved Products List (DoD APL)
- Common Criteria
- CMMC Level 1
- VPAT accessibility compliance

Zanni also contributed to the company's acquisition by EQT in 2024 by helping secure U.S. government approval, demonstrating compliance procedures and product security standards required for the transaction.

He stepped down from Acronis SCS in 2025 following the acquisition, choosing to launch his own venture in AI-enabled planning systems.

=== Easy Reserve Study (EZRS) (2025–present) ===
Zanni founded Easy Reserve Study (EZRS) in August 2025 after identifying inefficiencies in the reserve study and long-term infrastructure planning sector.

Drawing on experience from Acronis SCS, he applied two primary lessons to EZRS:

1. How to build and scale a startup, including vision, strategy, execution, budgeting, and team development.
2. How to build secure cloud services that meet stringent U.S. government security and data privacy standards.

The company anticipates a public launch in Q3 2026.

== See also ==
- Microsoft
- Acronis
- Parallels, Inc.
