= Runet =

Russian-language Internet community

Russophones worldwide, who generally use the Internet in Russian language

The Russian Internet (Russian: русский Интернет, romanized: russkiy Internet), shortened to Runet (Рунет), and also stylized as RuNet, is the part of the Internet that uses the Russian language, including the Russian-language community that uses the Web. Geographically, it reaches all continents, including Antarctica (due to Russian scientists living at Bellingshausen Station), but is based primarily in Russia, followed by other post-Soviet states. Runet is sometimes used narrowly to describe the Internet within Russian territory and jurisdiction.

The term Runet is a portmanteau of ru (code for both the Russian language and Russia's top-level domain) and Internet. It was coined in 1997 by the Azerbaijani-Israeli blogger Raffi Aslanbekov (Раффи Асланбеков), known as "Great Uncle" in Russia, on his Russian-language column Great Uncle's Thoughts. The term was popularized by early Internet users and was included in several dictionaries, including the spelling dictionary of the Russian Academy of Sciences, edited by V. V. Lopatin, as soon as in 2001. Similar, "local to Runet" sub-cultures of ChuvashTet and TatNet later emerged along with comparable concepts such as Uznet (Uzbekistan), Kaznet (Kazakhstan) and others.

== Use ==
For ordinary users, the term Runet means that the content of websites is available for Russian users without foreign language skills, or that online shops have an office in Russia (for example, Russian search engines, e-mail services, anti-viruses, dictionaries, Russian-language websites occupying niches similar to those of Facebook, Amazon, YouTube, eBay, PayPal, Foursquare, etc. for usage in all post-Soviet states). Being on the Runet gives a company some advantages, as many local IT companies are more successful than foreign services on the Russian market. The term can describe the situation of the 1990s to the early 2000s: foreign companies didn't want to operate in the Russian market and localize their products, so Russia-based start-ups were more attractive to Russian speaking users. Nowadays, some Russian users are not interested in usage of such services as Facebook or Google Maps because local services have more Russian-specific features and local community (VK.com, Yandex, etc.), though many international websites have very high quality Russian localization and Google search has had full support of Russian morphology. This is also more or less applicable to most post-Soviet states, who use the Runet and are forming a common lingua franca community like English on the Internet.

Many officials of the Russian government actively use this term as a synonym for Internet in the territory of Russia, i.e. for Internet infrastructure, which is subject to Russian law (including Russian censorship laws, copyright, corporate, advertisement laws, etc.), but the Russian online community doesn't support this use of the term as millions of users use the Russian language on the Internet while living outside Russia; Russian is spoken in large parts of eastern Europe that do not fall under Russian territory. Some Russian officials automatically believe that the Russian Wikipedia is based in Russia as a business entity and try to control the content of the website or establish a Russia-based clone of Wikipedia.

== Domains ==
According to reports conducted by Yandex, Russian is the primary language of 91% of Russian websites (in Yandex's list). In the autumn of 2009, Runet contained about 15 million sites (estimated to be about 6.5% of the entire Internet).

Domains with a high proportion of the Russian language include .su, .ru, .рф, .ua, .by, .kz.

Russian is used on 89.8% of .ru sites and on 88.7% of the former Soviet Union domain, .su. Russian is the most used language of websites of several countries that were part of the former Soviet Union: 79.0% in Ukraine, 86.9% in Belarus, 84.0% in Kazakhstan, 79.6% in Uzbekistan, 75.9% in Kyrgyzstan, and 81.8% in Tajikistan.

== Statistics ==
In 2013, there were approximately 59.7 million Russian-speaking Internet users, representing about 3% of the global online population; by March of that year, Russian was the second most widely used language on the web. Roughly a year prior, in April 2012, Russia ranked ninth worldwide by number of Internet users and fourth by share of Russian-language online content, accounting for 4.8% of the total. In September 2011, Russia surpassed Germany to become the largest Internet market in Europe, with 50.8 million users. In 2020, Russian speakers ranked ninth in both absolute and proportional terms among Internet users, at 116,353,942 and 2.5%, respectively. As of December 2025, Russian was the seventh most spoken language on the Internet, accounting for 3.8% of global users.

== Historical overview ==
Historically the term Runet has been described in several ways.

- In 2009, a Yandex report stated that the Runet can include sites written in Russian, Ukrainian, Belarusian and Kazakh languages, as well as sites in any language published in the 12 national domains of the original CIS nations: .am, .az, .by, .ge, .kg, .kz, .md, .ru, .su, .tj, .ua or .uz.
- Russian-language Internet. According to the definition in Yandex slovari dictionary published in 2001, the "Runet is the Russian Internet. The borders of Internet are usually not based on the "geographical borders", but rather on "languages", and therefore the term Runet is usually considered to be not only websites in .ru domain, but also all Russian-language and/or Russian-oriented websites". "Economic dictionary" of 2009 says "Runet is Russian-language part of the Internet". This is a common meaning of Runet. Practically, this definition makes it the Russian-language online community of post-Soviet states and their diasporas.
- .ru domain. Runet is the part of Internet, whose websites are in the top-level .ru domain. This definition would exclude Russian (language) or Russian (country) sites intentionally using other domains. Highly popular alternative domains include ".net" for humorous impact or strength of statement (as this means "no" in Russian), popular havens for illegal activities like ".me" (piracy) or ".cz" (to avoid prosecution for facilitation of prostitution), or ".com" for international expansion – the latter being home to Russia's #2 site by Alexa rank, domestic-owned and based international social network Vk.com. Runet Day is a semi-official term for April, 7, when .ru domain was created back in 1994.
- Internet in the Russian Federation. According to the definitions found in some early Yandex dictionaries, "Runet is the Russian part of [the] Internet". Also, Russian officials strongly suggest that Runet is the Internet in Russia.

== Research ==
Harvard University's Berkman Center conducts regular research of the Russian-language Web, identified by Cyrillic encoding, and, in particular, has papers named "Mapping RuNet Politics and Mobilization" and "RuNet Echo". The prominent Public Opinion Foundation (FOM) regular Internet measurements are titled Runet.fom.ru. There are Russian internet-reviewing newspapers called TheRunet, Runetologia and others.

== See also ==
- Advmaker
- Russophone
- Russian Internet slang
- Russian-language computing
- Russian-language websites
- English on the Internet
- Languages used on the Internet
- Sovereign Internet Law
- Splinternet
- Great Firewall
- 2011–2013 Russian protests
- Kwangmyong (network)
