= Constructor Institute =

Coordinates: 47.6917°N 8.6232°E

Constructor Institute of Technology (CIT)
- Formation: 2019
- Founder: Serg Bell
- Dissolved: 2026
- Headquarters: Schaffhausen, Switzerland
- Website: https://institute.constructor.org/
- Formerly called: Constructor Institute and Schaffhausen Institute of Technology (SIT)

Constructor Institute of Technology, formerly known as Constructor Institute and Schaffhausen Institute of Technology (SIT), was a private non-profit institute in Switzerland founded in 2019 by tech entrepreneur and investor Serg Bell. The Institute was a part of Constructor Group, comprising education services, technology, and a venture capital fund. The Group was inspired by Constructor Theory, a proposal for a new mode of explanation in fundamental physics in the language of ergodic theory.

In 2025 the institute announced that it would be ceasing operations in 2026 and devoting its efforts instead to Constructor University in Bremen, Germany.

== History ==
The Institute focused on teaching, academic research and leadership.

Collaborating with institutions such as Université de Genève and the National University of Singapore, the Institute offered advanced programs at the master, Ph.D., and postdoctoral levels. The development of the Institute was supported by the Canton of Schaffhausen in northern Switzerland through a 3 million Swiss franc ($3.2 million) funding deal. As a part of the Constructor ecosystem and its network of academics, scientists, investors and entrepreneurs, the Institute's academic strategy was set by the 2010 Nobel Laureate in Physics Konstantin Novoselov. Part of the Constructor ecosystem, in its education branch, was Constructor University, located in Bremen, Germany. In 2021, Constructor Group became the main shareholder of the private Jacobs University in Bremen, Germany. According to the Senate, the new majority owner intended to invest 50 million euros in Jacobs University, half of it in the next two years.

== Scientists and academics within the Constructor network ==
- Konstantin Novoselov, Chairman of the Strategic Advisory Board
- Mark Kamlet
- Mikhail Lukin
- Artur Ekert
- Nicolas Gisin
- Andrea Ferrari
- Rino Rappuoli
- Serguei Netessine
- Bertrand Meyer, Provost and Professor of Software Engineering
- Mauro Pezzè, Chair of Software Testing and Analysis
