= TatNet =

Segment of the internet about Tatar people or Tatarstan

TatNet (short for "Tatar Internet") is the name Tatar-speaking Internet users commonly use for the segment of the Web about the Tatar people or Tatarstan. It includes webpages and websites in many languages.

The first e-mail message in Tatar was probably sent and received in 1991 when employees of the Tatar-Bashkir Service of Radio Free Europe/Radio Liberty started using the Internet and electronic communication on a regular basis. In 1994, a Tatar-language mailing list (TMG, standing for Tatar Mailing Group) was established and this year is commonly regarded as the birthyear of the Tatar Internet. Since approximately 2000, Tatnet has been developing explosively, with many web pages and web sites added to it annually. The existence of Tatnet continues to contribute tremendously to the cohesion and consolidation of the Tatar people, a significant achievement because Tatars are dispersed all over the world and a substantial majority of Tatars live outside their ethnic homeland, Tatarstan. Tatar Internet users employ Latin and Cyrillic scripts with the former gradually becoming more dominant.

The name TatNet is a portmanteau for "Tatar Internet", formed as analogue of the alike terms Runet, Kaznet, Uznet and others. TatNet gets some support from Tatarstan authorities, e. g. the Republic's Agency on mass communication (Tatmedia) helps with organizing of the annual website building contest "Stars of TatNet" ("Татнет йолдызлары").

== See also ==
- Tatar Wikipedia
- ChuvashTet
