= Runa Capital =

International venture capital firm

- Type: Limited partnership
- Industry: Venture Capital
- Founded: 2010; 16 years ago
- Founders: Serg Bell; Dmitry Chikhachev; Ilya Zubarev
- Headquarters: Luxembourg
- Number of locations: Luxembourg, London, Berlin, Milan, Paris, San Francisco, Palo Alto (2023)
- Area served: Europe, North America
- Key people: Dmitry Chikhachev; Ilya Zubarev; Andre Bliznyuk; Dmitry Galperin; Konstantin Vinogradov; Michael Fanfant; Jinal Jhaveri
- AUM: $427m (June 2022)
- Website: runacap.com

Runa Capital is an international venture capital firm headquartered in Luxembourg that invests in deep tech, enterprise software, and fintech infractructure early-stage startups. From 2010 through 2022, Runa Capital raised around $500 million in 4 funds and invested in over 100 companies in more than 14 countries of Europe and North America, including Nginx, MariaDB, Zopa, Brainly, drchrono, Smava, Brainly and Mambu.

== History ==
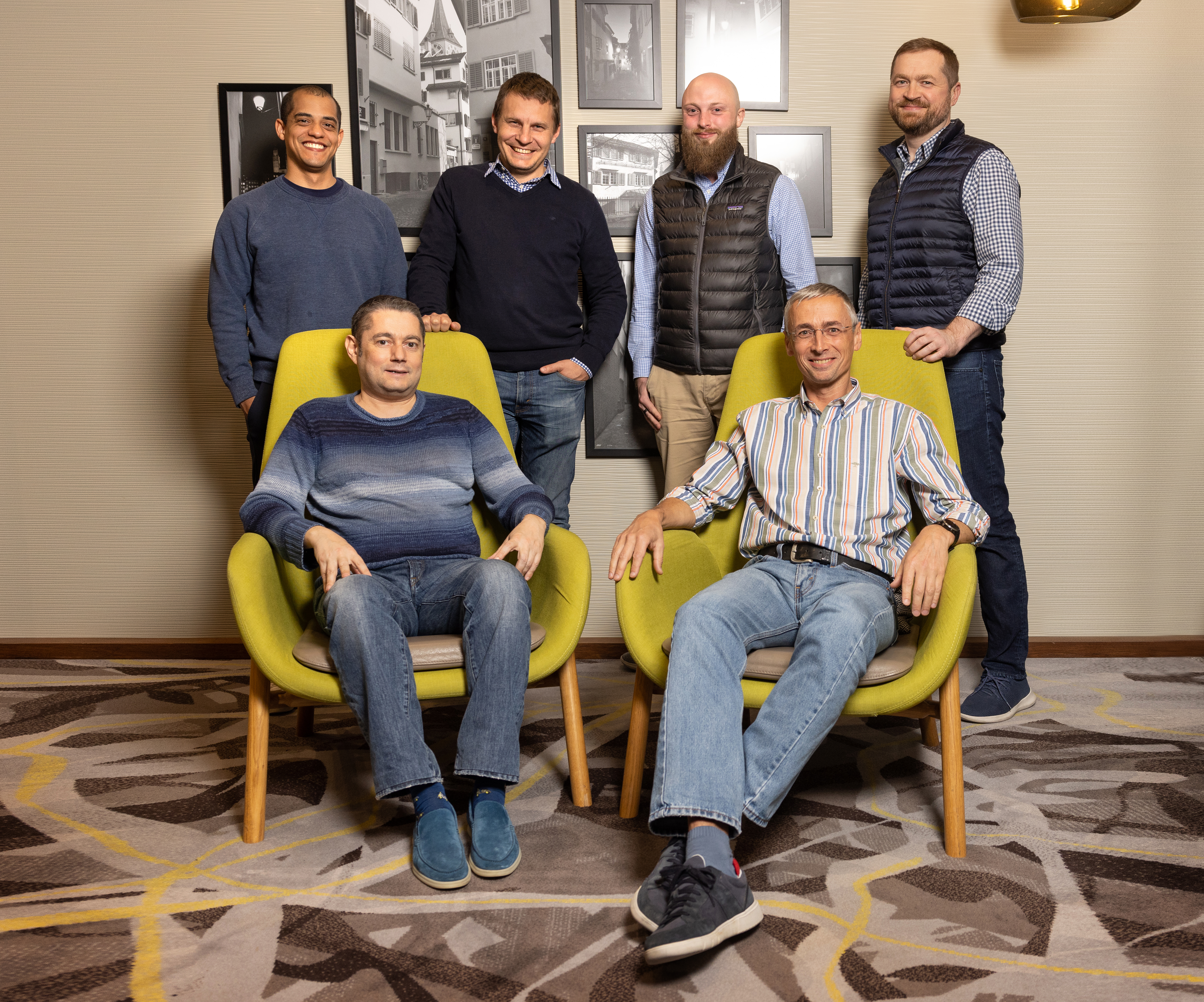
Runa Capital's General Partners (left to right): Michael Fanfant, Ilya Zubarev, Dmitry Galperin, Konstantin Vinogradov, Dmitry Chikachev and Andre Bliznyuk

Runa Capital was founded by technological entrepreneurs Serg Bell and Ilya Zubarev (founders of Acronis and Parallels), and their MIPT university friend Dmitry Chikhachev. The idea of the venture firm took shape in 2009 and was formally incorporated in 2010. The partners contributed their own money into the first fund and raised capital from friends and other international investors including Achim Weiss and Andreas Gauger, founders of German hosting provider 1&1, and Edward Nicholson, former CEO of Brunswick-UBS.

In 2011, Andre Bliznyuk joined Runa Capital as a General Partner. In 2022, the firm promoted its principals, Konstantin Vinogradov and Michael Fanfant, to general partners focusing on Europe and the U.S., respectively. In 2023, Serg Bell ceased his involvement in Runa Capital and resigned as a general partner. In 2020, the firm added Jinal Jhaveri as a venture partner.

Since 2020, Runa Capital operated the so-called Runa Open Source Startup (ROSS) Index, a quarterly ranking of the 20 fastest-growing open-source software startups (in 2023, it also published an annual report on the commercial open-source software trends).

== Funds ==
- Runa Capital I, firm's first namesake fund was launched in 2010, reached its final size of $135 million by 2012 and was focused on investments from seed to Series B stage. The initial idea was to fund globally oriented Eastern European startups in the fields of cloud computing, machine learning, virtualization, mobile and internet apps, but later the partners expanded their investment area to Europe and USA.
- Runa Capital II was launched in 2014 and reached $135 million by 2016 with large commitments from the first fund's backers. The second fund aimed at Series A and B rounds. The firm's new office was opened in California in 2015.
- Runa Capital III exceeded the target sum of $135 and reached $157 million in May 2020. The third fund followed the focus on deep tech with additional interest towards quantum computing startups.
- Runa Capital Opportunity Fund I was launched in May 2022 and raised $69 million by Autumn 2022.

== Investments ==
Runa Capital invests from $1 million to $10 million, largely in Series A rounds. From 2010 through 2022 it invested in over 100 companies, equally split between North America and Europe:

| Company | Description | HQ location | Invested | Acquired | Acquirer |
|---|---|---|---|---|---|
| Nginx | Open-source web server | San Francisco | 2011 | 2019 | F5 |
| Mambu | SaaS banking platform | Berlin | 2012 | — | — |
| Brainly | Social learning network | Kraków | 2014 | — | — |
| Anyroad | Experience relationship management platform | San Francisco, CA | 2021 | — | — |
| Lendio | Loan marketplace for SME | Lehi, UT | 2013 | — | — |
| Pasqal | Quantum computer developer | Palaiseau | 2021 | — | — |
| Smava | Consumer loan portal | Berlin | 2018 | — | — |
| drchrono | Electronic health record platform | Mountain View, CA | 2017 | — | — |
| Zopa | Peer-to-peer lending | London | 2013 | — | — |
| MariaDB | Relational database management system | Espoo; Redwood City, CA | 2015 | — | — |
| Acumatica | Cloud ERP | Bellevue, WA | 2013 | 2019 | EQT AB |
| Zype | Video content management platform | New York | 2017 | — | — |
| Reelgood | San Francisco | Streaming aggregator | 2019 | — | — |
| Zipdrug | Personalized pharmacy care | New York, NY | 2019 | 2020 | IngenioRx |
| Ecwid | SaaS-based e-commerce platform | Encinitas, CA | 2011 | 2020 | Morgan Stanley, PeakSpan Capital |
| Oxygen | Digital bank | San Francisco, CA | 2019 | — | — |
| Procurify | Cloud-based procurement software | Vancouver | 2016 | — | — |
| StopTheHacker | Anti-malware | Burlingame, CA | 2012 | 2014 | CloudFlare |
| OfficeRnD | Flex space operating platform | Sofia | 2021 | — | — |
| Capptain | Mobile analytics | Paris | 2012 | 2014 | Microsoft |
| bunny.net | Cloud Storage | Ljubljana, Slovenia | 2022 | — | — |

== Affiliated funds ==
In 2012, Runa Capital established the $30 million Quantum Wave Fund (Qwave) focused on startups in the field of quantum technology, which effectively served as a "materials science" arm for Runa Capital. In 2019, Runa Capital became a limited partner in the second fund of crypto-focused venture firm 1confirmation.
