= SWsoft =

- Type: Privately held company
- Industry: Computer software
- Genre: Virtualization
- Founded: 1997
- Fate: Changed name to Parallels, Inc. in 2008
- Headquarters: Herndon, Virginia, USA
- Key people: Serguei Beloussov; (Chairman); Birger Steen; (CEO)
- Products: Virtuozzo; Plesk; HSPcomplete; Parallels; PEM; SiteBuilder; Confixx
- Number of employees: 900 (2007)
- Website: www.sw.ru

SWsoft was a privately held server automation and virtualization software company and the parent company of Parallels. SWsoft developed software for running data centers, particularly for web-hosting services companies, application service providers, and managed service providers. SWsoft products included applications for operating system-level virtualization, which enables users to run multiple operating systems, including Windows, Mac OS X, Linux, and Solaris, on a single computer.

The company was founded in 1997 and maintained its headquarters in Herndon, Virginia, with additional offices throughout North America, Europe, and Asia. Its research and development offices were located in Moscow, Russia, and it had sales offices in Germany and Singapore.

In December 2007, SWsoft announced its plans to change its name to Parallels in 2008 and ship its products under the Parallels brand name.

== Company history ==
- 1997 – SWsoft founded
- 2001
  - Virtuozzo released
  - HSPcomplete released
- 2003
  - SWsoft acquires automation firms Yippi-Yeah! E-Business GmbH (makers of Confixx) and Plesk Inc (makers of Confixx and Plesk)
  - PEM data center released
  - Open Fusion launched
- 2004
  - Announces partnership with Acronis
  - Plesk 7.0 released
  - SiteBuilder beta released
  - Acquires Parallels, Inc. – but keeps this secret.
- 2007 – December 12: SWsoft announces that it will change its name to "Parallels" in 2008.
- 2007 – December: SWsoft acquires WebHostAutomation Ltd developers of HELM Control Panel.
- January 2008 – SWsoft officially becomes Parallels, Inc.

== Uses ==
SWsoft’s virtualization software is predominantly used to automate data center and server management and to consolidate multiple servers onto one Windows- or Linux-based physical server. The company’s products are developed predominantly for web hosting companies, service providers, and corporations.

Although the company’s software reportedly uses fewer system resources because it does not require each virtualized server to have an independent operating system, its overall flexibility is limited. For example, each virtualized Virtuozzo server must have the same version of the same operating system, and when running Linux, the operating system's kernel must be modified from the standard version.
