= Isabel Wünsche =

German art historian and Professor

Academic background
- Education: Heidelberg University
- Thesis: Das Kunstkonzept der Organischen Kultur in der Kunst der russischen Avantgarde (1997)

Isabel Wünsche (born 1965 in Dresden) is a German art historian and professor of art and art history at Constructor University Bremen.

== Biography ==
Wünsche studied art history, classical and Christian archeology at Humboldt University Berlin (1986–92), Moscow State University (1991–92), and Heidelberg University (1993–96). From 1993 to 1996, she was a visiting fellow at the Department of Slavic Languages and Literature and at the Institute of Modern Russian Culture of the University of Southern California in Los Angeles. In 1997, she completed her PhD thesis on the Organic School of the Russian avant-garde and was awarded a PhD degree from Heidelberg University.

From 1993 to 2001, she lived and worked in Los Angeles. In 1995–96, she was a curatorial fellow at the Robert Gore Rifkind Center for German Expressionism of the Los Angeles County Museum of Art. As Curatorial Associate at the Norton Simon Museum in Pasadena, she worked, from 1997 to 2000, on the Catalogue Raisonné of the Galka Scheyer Blue Four Collection. In 2000–2001, she curated the permanent exhibition of twentieth-century American art at the Huntington Library, Art Collections, and Botanical Gardens in San Marino. She also taught courses on modern art at the California Institute of Technology, Scripps College, Claremont, and the University of California, Los Angeles.

In 2001, Wünsche was appointed associate professor of art and art history at International University Bremen (since 2007 Jacobs University, since 2022 Constructor University); in 2011, she was promoted to full professor.

== Research groups and projects ==
Her research area is art and art theory of the nineteenth to twenty-first centuries, particularly European modernism and the historic avant-garde movements, their reception beyond Europe, the role of artists’ networks and other forms of artistic exchange, the emergence and ideologization of abstract art, and interrelations between art, science and technology in modern and contemporary art.

Among the research projects and research groups she has organized are:

- “Decolonizing the Avant-garde”, a collaborative research initiative
- The Russian Art & Culture Group
- "German-Finnish Artistic Relations and Cultural Exchange in the 20th Century," project-based exchange with Finland, funded by the German Academic Exchange Board (DAAD), 2019–2021
- "Bauhaus Australia: Émigrés, Refuges, and the Modernist Transformation of Education in Art, Architecture, and Design, 1930–1970” (with Philip Goad, University of Melbourne; Harriet Enquist, Royal Melbourne Institute of Technology; Andrew McNamara, Queensland University of Technology; Ann Stephen, University of Sydney), funded by the Australian Research Council (ARC), 2016–2019
- “Peripheral Expressionisms,” international research and publication project, funded by the Federal Government Commissioner for Culture and the Media (BKM), 2015–2017
- “German-Portuguese Artistic Relations in the Twentieth Century,” project-based exchange with Portugal, funded by the German Academic Exchange Board (DAAD), 2014–2015
- “Collaborative Artists’ Networks: Germany – Croatia,” project-based exchange with Croatia, funded by the German Academic Exchange Board (DAAD), 2014–2015
- “The Reception of German Modernism and the Bauhaus in Australian Art, Architecture, and Art Education between 1920 and 1960,” project-based exchange with Australia, funded by the German Academic Exchange Board (DAAD), 2012–2013
- “The Politics of Abstraction: Modernist Art and Visual Culture in the Globalized World,” funded by the German Science Foundation (DFG), 2011–12

== Grants, fellowships and awards ==
In 1990–1991, Wünsche received grants from the Walter Kaminsky Stiftung and from Moscow State University (MGU); from 1993 to 1996 she was a recipient of a three-year dissertation grant by the Gottlieb Daimler- und Karl Benz-Stiftung. Wünsche has had fellowships with The Huntington Library, Art Collections, and Botanical Gardens in San Marino, California (2003–2004), the Nancy and Norton Dodge Collection of Nonconformist Art from the Soviet Union, the Zimmerli Art Museum at Rutgers, The State University of New Jersey (2003–2004, 2007), the National Humanities Center, North Carolina (2007–2008), the Institute for Advanced Study, Collegium Budapest (2008–2009), New Europe College Institute for Advanced Study, Bukarest (2016), and the Robert Gore Rifkind Center for German Expressionist Studies at the Los Angeles County Museum of Art (2022). She is the recipient of research grants from the German Science Foundation (DFG, 2011–2012), the German Academic Exchange Board (DAAD, 2012–2013, 2014–2015, 2019–2021), the Federal Government Commissioner for Culture and the Media (BKM, 2013, 2015, 2017), and the Australian Research Council (ARC, 2016–2019). In 2021, she was selected as a scout by the Alexander von Humboldt Foundation for the Henriette Herz Scouting Program.

== Major publications ==
=== Books ===
- Galka E. Scheyer & Die Blaue Vier: Briefwechsel 1924–1945 (German and Englisch editions, Bern: Benteli Verlag, 2006).
- Harmonie und Synthese: Die russische Moderne zwischen universellem Anspruch und nationaler kultureller Identität. Munich: Wilhelm Fink. 2008. ISBN 978-3-7705-4686-2.
  - Reviewed
- Kunst & Leben. Michail Matjuschin und die russische Avantgarde in St. Petersburg. Cologne: Böhlau. 2012. ISBN 978-3-412-20730-4.
- The Organic School of the Russian Avant-garde: Nature's Creative Principles. UK: Ashgate. 2015. ISBN 978-1-4724-3269-8.
  - Reviewed
- The Routledge Compantion to Expressionism in a Transnational Context. Isabel Wünsche. New York. 2019. ISBN 978-1-351-77799-5. OCLC 1049150425.

=== Edited volumes ===
- Kursschwankungen : russische Kunst im Wertesystem der europäischen Moderne. Ada Raev, Isabel Wünsche (1. Aufl ed.). Berlin: Lukas. 2007. ISBN 978-3-86732-012-2. OCLC 166763272.
  - Reviewed
- Biocentrism and Modernism (with Oliver A. I. Botar), Farnham, UK: Ashgate, 2011; Paperback Edition, Routledge 2016. ISBN 978-3-86732-012-2.
- Meanings of Abstract Art: Between Nature and Theory (with Paul Crowther), London: Routledge, 2012; Paperback Edition 2016. ISBN 978-0-415-89993-2.
- Marianne Werefkin and the Women Artists in Her Circle (with Tanja Malycheva), Amsterdam: Brill/Rodopi, 2016. ISBN 978-90-04-32897-6.
- Practices of Abstract Art: Between Anarchism and Appropriation (with Wiebke Gronemeyer), Newcastle, UK: Cambridge Scholars Publishing, 2016. ISBN 978-1-4438-9734-1.
- BAUHAUS DIASPORA: Transforming Education in Art, Architecture and Design (with Philip Goad, Ann Stephen, Andrew McNamara, Harriet Enquist, Melbourne: Melbourne University Press, 2019).
- 100 Years On: Revisiting the First Russian Art Exhibition of 1922 (with Miriam Leimer), Cologne, Vienna: Böhlau, 2022.

=== Special editions of journals ===
- Isabel Wünsche, Galka Scheyer und die Blaue Vier, in Sonderdruck der Berner Kunstmitteilungen, Bern: Kunstmuseum Bern, 1997.
- Isabel Wünsche, Sebastian Borkhardt, Tanja Malycheva (eds.), “In Memoriam: Dmitry Vladimirovich Sarabyanov,” Experiment: A Journal of Russian Culture/Eksperiment: Zhurnal russkoi kultury, vol. 23 (2017)
- Ludmila Piters-Hofmann, Isabel Wünsche (eds.), issue on “Artistic Communities and Educational Approaches in Nineteenth- and Early Twentieth-Century Russia,” Russian History Russian History 46 (2019).

== Public Media Presentations ==
- Konferenz “Bauhaus Sammeln”: 3 Fragen an Isabel Wünsche, Jacobs University Bremen, Stiftung Bauhaus Dessau, 2020.
- Krach 1991: „Anstrengend, kompliziert, aber ein Höchstmass an Freiheit”, Dekoder, 2022.
- Russian Berlin in the 1920s, DW History and Culture, 2024.
- "Wissenschaft persönlich: Prof. Dr. Isabel Wünsche", Bremen erleben!, 2024.
