= Internet in Kazakhstan =

The Internet in Kazakhstan (ccTLD: .kz) is growing rapidly. Between 2001 and 2005, the number of Internet users increased from 200,000 to 1 million. By 2007, Kazakhstan reported Internet penetration levels of 8.5 percent, rising to 12.4 percent in 2008 and 34.3% in 2010. By 2013, Kazakhstani officials reported Internet penetration levels of 62.2 percent, with about 10 million users. There are five first-tier ISPs with international Internet connections and approximately 100 second-tier ISPs that are purchasing Internet traffic from the first-tier ISPs. As of 2019, more than 75% of Kazakhstan's population has access to the internet, a figure well ahead of any other country in Central Asia. The Internet consumption in the country rose from 356 PB in 2018 to 1,000 PB in 2022.

As of 2021 Kazakhstan is currently rated "not free" by Freedom House's Freedom on the Net report.

== Penetration ==
The National Statistical Agency reports that 73 percent of Kazakh users access the Internet by dial-up, 15 percent by means of ADSL, and 6 percent by satellite access. Over 50 percent of users accessed the Internet from home in 2008. Forty-two percent of families living in towns with populations of at least 70,000 people had a personal computer. KazakhTelekom (KT) reported an increase in its broadband subscriber base from 270,000 to 456,000 in 2008. Despite these increases, Internet usage is concentrated in urban centers, while outside those centers access remains beyond the reach of most Kazakhs.

The official language in Kazakhstan is Kazakh, spoken by 64 percent of the population. Russian, spoken by 85 percent, is recognized as the official language of international communication. Russian is the most popular language used on the Kazakhstani Internet (94.1 percent), followed by Kazakh (4.5 percent), and English (1.4 percent), a figure which may account for the high percentage of Kazakh websites hosted in Russia (including those with the country-code domain name “.kz”). Six percent of “.kz” domain websites are hosted in Kazakhstan, with the remainder hosted in Russia and elsewhere.

The cost of Internet access remains high relative to the national average salary (54,500 tenge in 2008, or US$363). KazakhTelecom's fee for unlimited ADSL access with capacity of 128 kbit/s was US$30. However, as a result of the ongoing liberalization in the telecommunications sector in 2007, operators’ fees fell considerably. Since 2007, schools in Kazakhstan have been provided with free dial-up access, which is being expanded to include broadband connections (although access is restricted to Web sites and other Internet resources within the “.kz” domain).

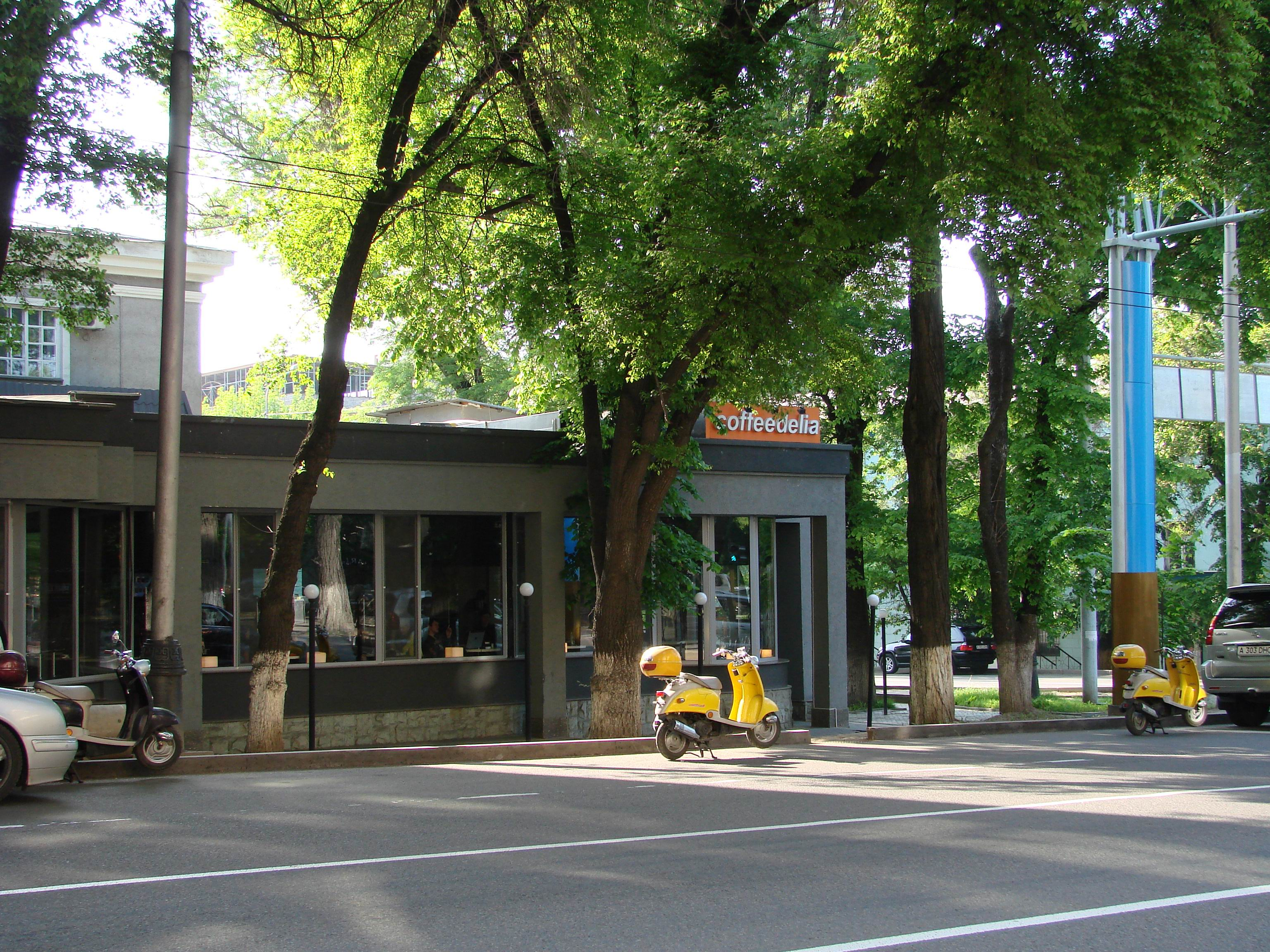
"Coffeedelia", a Wi-Fi café located in Almaty.

== Internet service providers ==
KazakhTelecom is the operator of the national data transfer network, which connects the major cities of Kazakhstan. It features a total bandwidth of 957 Mbit/s and a carrying capacity in separate local segments of up to 10 Gbit/s. KazakhTelecom had about 2.5 million fixed line subscribers in 2005 and accounted for approximately 90 percent of the country's fixed line market. It currently controls 49 percent of the country's leading mobile operator, GSM Kazakhstan, and 50 percent of another cellular operator, Altel. In 2015, broadband internet speed in Kazakhstan was estimated at 18.41 Mbit/s on average.

Liberalization of the telecommunications market in 2004 increased competition among the five licensed operators: KazakhTelecom (the former state monopoly, now with 51 percent state participation), Transtelekom, Kaztranscom, Arna (DUCAT), and Astel. First-tier ISPs with international Internet connections and their own infrastructure are KazakhTelecom, Nursat, Transtelecom, Kaztranscom, Arna, Astel, and TNS Plus.

There are approximately 100 second-tier ISPs that purchase Internet traffic from first-tier ISPs. They include:

- Kcell (3G)
- INTELSOFT (cable)
- Optinet (cable access)
- AlmaTV (cable access)
- Beeline (3G, cable)
- DigitalTV (WiMax)
- Nursat
- Sekatel
- SputTV (satellite access)
- 2Day Telecom (dial-up)

Market liberalization has not been completely carried out, as there are restrictions on foreign ownership for fixed-line operators providing long-distance and international services. In addition, KazakhTelecom retains dominance over the telecommunications market, making it difficult for other operators to compete.

KazakhTelecom also launched an interactive IP TV service on 11 March 2009 as it worked to maintain its dominance in the fixed-line market. Other leading first-tier ISPs, Nursat and Astel, operate terrestrial and satellite-based infrastructure. There are five mobile operators in the country. Three operators are offering GSM services and two CDMA. The government estimates that 60 percent of the population uses mobile services.

One of the largest ISPs, Arna (DUCAT), accused KazakhTelecom of breaking a law regarding the promotion of competition and the limiting of monopolistic activities. Arna claimed that KazakhTelecom used uncertified systems that monitored and interfered with the telecommunications of customers who are using services offered by competing companies. An investigation of the Kazakh government revealed that such systems indeed existed and were used by KazakhTelecom, but no evidence was found to prove KazakhTelecom was intentionally interfering with competitor activities.

== Legal and regulatory frameworks ==
The Kazakh government has exhibited an ambiguous and at times contradictory approach to the Internet. The long-term development strategy of Kazakhstan for 2030 demonstrates the government's strong commitment to create a modern national information infrastructure. The government had announced plans to develop e-government as a part of a 2005–2007 program. Since 2008, government officials have been encouraged to create their own personal blogs. At the same time, the government follows a multilevel information security policy, which maintains surveillance of telecommunications and Internet traffic in the country.

The Ministry of Transport and Communications (MTC) is the main policymaker and regulator in the telecommunications market. The Agency for Informatization and Communication (AIC), a central executive body in the IT field, is authorized to implement state policy in telecommunications and information technology development industries, exercise control in these sectors, and issue licenses to every type of telecommunications service. The Security Council (SC), a body chaired by the president, is responsible for drafting decisions and providing assistance to the head of state on issues of defense and national security. The SC also prepares a list of Web sites every six months that should be blocked or forbidden from distribution. A 2005 SC decision made it illegal for key national security bodies to connect to the Internet (namely, the Ministries of Emergency Situations, Internal Affairs, and Defense, and the National Security Committee). However, despite this prohibition, ONI field researchers found evidence that state officials access forbidden Web sites using dial-up accounts and anonymizer applications.

The security system in Kazakhstan is complex and multi-layered. The Inter-Departmental Commission is charged with coordinating and developing national information infrastructure. The National Security Committee (NSC) monitors presidential, government, and military communications. The Office of the Prime Minister is an authorized state body responsible for the protection of state secrets and maintenance of information security. Broadly defined, a 'state secret' encompasses various government policies as well as information about the president's private life, health, and financial affairs. The NSC has issued a general license to the private Agency on Information Security to establish and organize facilities for cryptographic protection of information, as well as to formulate proposals on information security to state organizations, corporate clients, banks, and other large commercial companies. The Kazakh Ministry of Internal Affairs operates Department ‘‘K’’, which bears the functions of its counterpart in the Russian Federation. This department is tasked with investigating and prosecuting cybercrime and cyberattacks. At present, ISPs are required to prohibit their customers from disseminating pornographic, extremist, or terrorist materials or any other information that is not in accordance with the country’s laws. Kazakh officials are also considering additional laws to further regulate the Kazakh Internet. One draft law presently under consideration would attach liability to owners of Web sites hosting weblogs and forums, as well as users of chat rooms. The draft law equates Internet sites to media outlets and applies similar regulations with respect to content. The authors of the law justified tighter oversight by the need to fight cybercrime and provide greater accountability for Internet users.

The Kazakhstan Association of IT Companies is the officially recognized administrator of the ‘‘.kz’’ domain. It is registered as an NGO, but is 80% government-owned. The rules of registration and management of the ‘‘.kz’’ domain were issued by the State Agency on Informatization and Communication of the Republic of Kazakhstan in 2005. In recent years, the cost for registering and maintaining a domain name have significantly decreased, thereby boosting the development of the Kazakh portion of the Internet. Registrations are subject to strict regulation. Applications may be denied if the server on which they are located resides outside Kazakhstan. Even though the primary legislation guarantees freedom of speech and prohibits censorship, the government often resorts to various legal mechanisms to suppress ‘‘inappropriate’’ information or to ensure that domain names used by opposition groups are frozen or withdrawn. As a result, very few political parties in Kazakhstan use the Internet, and few opposition or illegal parties have an online presence (at least within the ‘‘.kz’’ domain).

Some 300 legislative acts expressly or implicitly control the ICT environment. All telecommunications operators are legally obliged, as part of their licensing requirements, to connect their channels to a public network controlled by KazakhTelecom. The Billing Center of Telecommunication Traffic, established by the government in 1999, helps monitor the activity of private companies and strengthens the monopolist position of KazakhTelecom in the IT sphere. In the past, some telecommunications operators circumvented such regulations by using VoIP for their interregional and international traffic, but the imposition of VoIP telephony tariffs eliminated this option.

=== Internet shutdowns ===
Internet shutdowns have occurred periodically, according to cybersecurity analysts, during periods of political unrest. In 2018 when events held by the political opposition were live streamed on social media, the Kazakh government throttled needed bandwidth for such uses; and in 2019 it repeated its efforts to restrict social media when opposition leaders protested the government's plans for victory celebrations of the end of the Second World War. In February 2021, in the wake of a European Parliament resolution on human rights in the country and domestic protests over the release of political prisoners, several sources reported "internet shutdown . . . in . . . Almaty and Nur-Sultan," two of the largest cities in the country.

Western media reported on partial and total shutdowns of the internet and telephone system in Almaty, the country's largest city, during country-wide political unrest during January 2022. Further reports indicated the "internet was shut down across the country." One source reported partial shutdowns of phone and internet on 4 January with a "country-wide blackout . . . affecting all connectivity in the country" on 5 January. On 6 January it was reported that "WhatsApp, Signal, and Telegram messaging services [were] offline" while local internet operators including Kaz Telecom, Beeline, and Kcell had "shut down their services." Also on 6 January, the UK government issued a statement specifically calling for "resumption of internet services and for the Kazakh authorities to respect their commitments to freedom of speech and expression." The Economist magazine describes such shutdowns as a government strategy "to quell protests and disrupt elections" while critics argue it "violates human rights."

Data from internet analyst Cloudflare detailed the abrupt shutdown of the country's internet shortly after 10:30 UTC on 5 January, subsequently reporting on 7 January "The nationwide Internet shutdown in Kazakhstan is now in its third day." Internet services were briefly activated during public speeches by Kazakh President Kassym-Jomart Tokayev, including his appeal to Russia to send in Russian troops to "protect the state." A partial internet restoration on 7 January "started at around 02:50 UTC (08:50 local time) and it ended three hours later (05:50 UTC)." On 10 January Reuters reported "state-imposed internet shutdown in Kazakhstan entered a sixth day."

One consequence of the January 2022 Kazakh internet shutdown was a measurable blow to the cryptocurrency world. Kazakhstan emerged as the world's second largest miner of Bitcoin (after the United States) following China's total crackdown on cryptocurrencies in May—September 2021. So-called cryptominers moved from China to Kazakhstan, drawn by the country's ample coal-fired electric power. Consequently, Kazakhstan doubled its national share of global cryptocurrency mining muscle, known as the "hash rate", from roughly 9 percent to 18 percent. Western media reported that global "hash rate" shrank significantly when the Kazakh government shut off the country's internet in early January 2022. "Within the hours of the outage, bitcoin’s computational power sank," wrote The Guardian. "A few hours into the outage . . . a full 12% of Bitcoin's worldwide computational power had vanished [owing to] sharp declines for a number of producers with operations in Kazakhstan. The hash rates for AntPool, Poolin and Binance Pool all fell between 12% and 16%," observed Forbes.

=== Provisions for propagation of false information and spreading rumors ===
The new Criminal Code of Kazakhstan, which took effect on January 1, 2015, prohibits the “deliberate propagation of false information,” sometimes labeled as “spreading rumors.” According to the Jamestown Foundation, "the dissemination of such unsubstantiated information in the media and on social networks may be subject to fines as high as $54,000 or, as an alternative, community work or a jail sentence up to five years." This measure was adopted in the wake of a run on two banks in February 2014, which was fueled by text messages on mobile phones. These communications resulted in the bailout of Kaspi Bank by the National Bank of Kazakhstan. However, it was also invoked in the case of a young man who spread false information about the death of Prime Minister Serik Akhmetov in January 2015.

== Surveillance and filtering ==
The government has established systems to monitor and filter Internet traffic. Since the traffic of all first-tier ISPs goes through KazakhTelecom's channels, surveillance and filtering is centralized. The ONI suspects that state officials informally ask KazakhTelecom to filter certain content. KazakhTelecom, along with some Russian companies, has openly signed an agreement to provide filtering, censorship, and surveillance on the basis of Security Council resolutions. There are several recorded cases of journalists and Web site owners that have been prosecuted under broad media and criminal provisions. Twenty-one opposition and independent media sites have been permanently suspended, allegedly for providing links to publications concerning corruption among senior state officers and the president.

In 2004, the chairs of the National Security Committee and the Agency for Informatization and Communications approved rules providing for mechanisms for monitoring telecommunications operators and networks. These rules prescribe full collaboration and information sharing between the government agencies. This system is similar to that of the Russian SORM, introduced to monitor activities of users and any related information. The rules oblige ISPs to register and maintain electronic records of customer Internet activity. Providers are required to install special software and hardware equipment in order to create and store records for a specified amount of time, including log-in times, connection types, transmitted and received traffic between parties of the connection, identification numbers of sessions, duration of time spent online, IP address of the user, and speed of data receipt and transmission.

The OpenNet Initiative conducted testing on two main ISPs: KazakhTelecom and Nursat. KazakhTelecom blocks opposition groups’ Web sites, regional media sites that carry political content, and selected social networking sites. A number of proxy sites providing anonymous access to the Internet have also been blocked. The ONI suspects that filtering practices in Kazakhstan are evolving and are performed at the network backbone by KazakhTelecom, which filters traffic it provides to downstream operators. Consequently, Kazakh ISPs may unknowingly receive pre-filtered content. At the same time, not all incoming and outgoing traffic passes through KazakhTelecom’s centralized network, resulting in inconsistent patterns of blocking. The majority of Internet users are on ‘‘edge’’ networks, such as Internet cafés and corporate networks. Kazakhstan companies apply filtering mechanisms at the user level to prevent employees from accessing pornography, music, film, and dating Web sites. However, ONI testing found that Kazakhstan does not block any pornographic content or sites related to drug and alcohol use. Since 2016, the Kazakh government has blocked the social media website Tumblr because of religious extremism and pornography.

== Root certificate man-in-the middle attack ==
In 2015, the government of Kazakhstan created a "national security certificate" which would have allowed a man-in-the-middle attack on HTTPS traffic from Internet users in Kazakhstan. Such an attack would involve requiring all Internet users to install a root certificate controlled by the Kazakh government into all their devices, allowing it to intercept, decrypt, and re-encrypt any traffic passing through systems it controlled. However, ISPs and banks opposed the change and the certificate was not deployed at the time.

In July 2019, the Kazakh government moved forward with their original plans and required ISPs to force their users to install a root certificate issued by the government.

== Terminology ==
People in Kazakhstan use the term "Kaznet" to refer to Internet space originating from and related to Kazakhstan. Similarly, they use the terms "Uznet", "Kirnet"/"Kegnet", and "Runet" are used to refer to Uzbek, Kyrgyz, and Russian internet spaces, respectively.

== Modern cybersecurity landscape ==
In early 2025, Kazakhstan experienced a significant rise in cyberattacks, with the number of information security incidents recorded doubling compared to the same period in 2024. Between January and May 2025, approximately 30,000 cyberattacks were reported, up from 15,000 the previous year. The most notable increase was in botnet-related activities, which surged from 1,700 incidents in the first quarter of 2024 to 17,600 in 2025. These attacks included spam mailings, password cracking, and remote system intrusions. Phishing attempts also saw a notable rise, increasing by 37.2% to 2,000 cases. Meanwhile, other types of cyber threats such as computer viruses, worms, and Trojans declined by 17.9%, with 7,900 incidents reported. Distributed denial-of-service (DDoS) attacks dropped to 23 incidents, compared to 30 in the previous year. Despite these challenges, Kazakhstan's IT sector continued to grow, with the value of services in computer programming and related fields reaching 1.5 trillion tenge ($2.9 billion) in 2024, marking a 36.3% increase from 2023. Almaty and Astana accounted for the bulk of the sector's activity, with 90.2% of IT services provided in these two cities.

== Milestones ==
- On 19 September 1994, .kz was officially registered as a top-level domain
- On 24 December 1996, E. Alexander Lyakhov, the unofficial "father of the Kazakhstan Internet", founded the informational-educational portal "Lyakhov.kz – Large Encyclopedia of Kaznet"
- In 1997, Kazakhstan's site received its first international award at the international «Business Website of 1997» competition.
- In 1997, Lyahovy launched a project directory rubricator of Kazakh web resources, "The whole WWW Kazakhstan"
- In 1998, the Kazakh part of the Internet appeared in the first online store and catalog goods site, Guide Park
- In June 1998, the first site in the Kazakh language appeared: Physico-Technical Institute MN-AN RK
- Since September 1998, Kazakhstan has offered continuous broadcasting over the Internet via broadcast transmissions from an Almaty broadcasting hub via STC Almatytelekom using RealAudio.
- In October 1998, the electronic catalogue KazGU, listing educational resources, is launched.
- In 1999, the IANA created the Kazakh Network Information Center as an administrator of country code top-level domain .kz
- On April 6, 2004, the Kazakhstan Association of IT Companies (KAITK) was created.
- 2004 - the domain .kz was transferred to the control of the Agency of Kazakhstan for Informatization and Communication.
- On October 1, 2005, the management and regulation of the domain .kz was assumed by two organizations: the Kazakh Network Information Centre (KazNIC) in a de facto capacity, and the Kazakhstan Association of IT-companies de jure, which runs the development of the national domain.
- On March 12, 2010, as a result of reorganization of the Agency of Kazakhstan for Informatization and Communication and the Ministry of Culture and Information, the Ministry of Communications and Information was established and granted the power of regulating the Internet.
- In May 2011, Google, which operates google.kz, was notified by the Ministry of Communications and Information in Kazakhstan that all .kz domain names had to operate on servers physically located within Kazakh borders. In response to the requirement, Google decided to redirect google.kz visitors to google.com; this change meant search results were no longer customized for Kazakhstan.
- In June 2011, Google relaunched google.kz. The Kazakh authorities issued new guidance stating that the order that all .kz domains must operate on servers physically located within Kazakh borders no longer applied to previously registered domains.

== See also ==
- Communications in Kazakhstan
- Kazakhstan man-in-the-middle attack
