= LendingRobot =

Automated investment service for Peer-to-peer lending for retail investors

- Company type: Private
- Industry: Personal finance, Software
- Founded: 2012
- Headquarters: Seattle, Washington
- Key people: Emmanuel Marot, Gilad Golan
- Products: Peer-to-peer lending
- Website: LendingRobot.com

LendingRobot is an automated investment service for Peer-to-peer lending for retail investors. It is based in Seattle, Washington, and was the first SEC-registered Investment Advisor in the Peer to Peer Lending industry.

== History ==
LendingRobot was originally created as a small script by Emmanuel Marot and Gilad Golan to automate their own, personal investments on Lending Club. After discovering that the most popular loans were gone a few seconds only after publication, they decided to offer the service to other individual investors. The first tests with external users were made in September 2013. In the following months, LendingRobot accepted more users while still remaining in private beta.

In April 2014 LendingRobot exited beta and has become the first company to offer automated secondary market note trading on FOLIOfn, a note trading platform for Lending Club.

LendingRobot added support for the Prosper Marketplace in February 2014, and became registered as Investment Advisor with the SEC in April 2014.

It closed first a Seed Round of $700,000 during the spring of 2014, and a Series A financing round of approximately $3 million in January 2015, led by investor Runa Capital

LendingRobot has been listed as a member of "30 Hot Fintech Startups to Watch" by Fox Small Business.

On 3 September 2015 LendingRobot announced a partnership with Lending Club to be the first partner aligned with the Lending Club's latest initiative— Lending Club Open Integration, which allows investors to open accounts through third party websites.

On 20 November 2015 LendingRobot launched a partnership with Funding Circle to offer its clients access to the fractional business loan market.

On 4 April 2016 LendingRobot launched the first multi-marketplace monitoring application for the App Store (iOS) and Google Play store.
