= Parallels Transporter =

Parallels Transporter is software developed by Parallels, Inc. that makes switching from Microsoft Windows to Mac OS X easier. It copies all user documents and many application preferences from PC to Mac, as well as creating a virtual machine of the former Windows PC.
