= LinguaLeo =

English language learning service

- Website type: Online education
- Available in: Available to learn; English; Available in; Brazilian Portuguese; Russian; Turkish
- Website: lingualeo.com
- Registration: Free (paid subscription available)
- Launched: 1 March 2010; 16 years ago
- Current status: Public

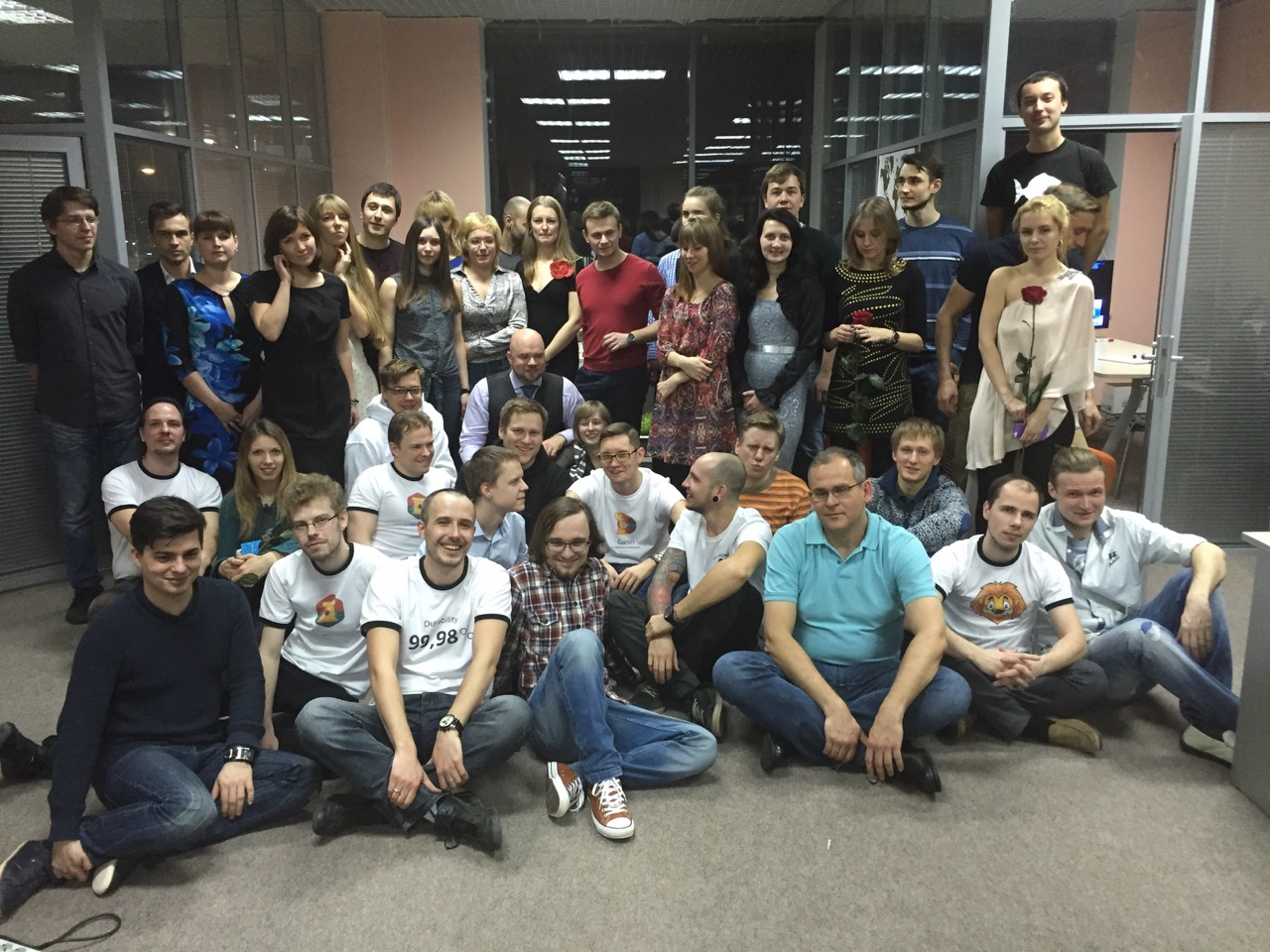

LinguaLeo is an English language learning platform for Russian, Turkish, and Brazilian Portuguese speakers. As of September 2020, it reported 23 million users. LinguaLeo is available on the web, as Android, iOS, Windows Phone apps, and as a browser extension.

== Mechanics ==
The app assesses the user's language skills through a test and provides a personalized training program with grammar exercises and lessons to expand the vocabulary and improve understanding of written texts and spoken language. The app library includes over 200,000 real-world materials to study: media articles, news, TED Talks, songs, videos, stories, and jokes. To motivate the users, LinguaLeo adds gamification mechanics through interaction with the app's mascot Leo the Lion.

LinguaLeo is available as an Android, iOS, Windows Phone, and web applications, and a browser extension. The data is synchronized across all devices. A paid subscription provides access to extra courses, tutorials, and interactive training and allows one to add an unlimited number of words to the personal dictionary.

== History ==
LinguaLeo was launched as a web application in March 2010 by Russian entrepreneur Aynur Abdulnasurov and his four-person development team. The initial investments totaled $120,000. In November 2010, the startup raised $200,000 in seed money from private investors. From May to November 2021, LinguaLeo's user base grew from 90,000 to 500,000 users. It was considered one of the most prominent Russian startups and won a Russian Venture Company competition in 2011. By late 2011, LinguaLeo reached the breakeven point.

In 2012, LinguaLeo released its iOS, Android, and Windows Phone apps reaching 1,5 mil users. It also received a $3 million investment from Runa Capital. In December 2012, the company was rated first in the Russian Startup Rating. In 2013, the company expanded to the Brazilian market. In Q4 2013, it reported 7 million users worldwide. The Next Web named LinguaLeo the best Russian startup of 2013, and Microsoft named it the best Windows Phone app of 2014.

== See also ==
- Language education
- Computer-assisted language learning
- List of Language Self-Study Programs
