= IEEE Transactions on Software Engineering =

- Discipline: Software engineering
- Language: English
- Edited by: Mauro Pezzè

Publication details
- History: 1975–present
- Publisher: IEEE Computer Society
- Frequency: Monthly
- Impact factor: 6.5 (2023)

Standard abbreviations
- ISO 4: IEEE Trans. Softw. Eng.

Indexing
- CODEN: IESEDJ
- ISSN: 0098-5589 (print); 1939-3520 (web)
- LCCN: 75644175
- OCLC no.: 1434336

Links
- Journal homepage; Online access; Online archive

The IEEE Transactions on Software Engineering is a monthly peer-reviewed scientific journal published by the IEEE Computer Society. It was established in 1975 and covers the area of software engineering. It is considered the leading journal in this field.

== Abstracting and indexing ==
The journal is abstracted and indexed in the Science Citation Index Expanded and Current Contents/Engineering, Computing & Technology. According to the Journal Citation Reports, the journal has a 2023 impact factor of 6.5.

== History of editors-in-chief ==
Name	Affiliation	Term
Mauro Pezzè	Università della Svizzera Italiana and Università Milano-Bicocca	2026–
Sebastian Uchitel	Universidad de Buenos Aires	2023–2025
Nenad Medvidović	University of Southern California	2018–2022
Matthew B. Dwyer	University of Nebraska–Lincoln	2014–2017
Bashar Nuseibeh	Open University	2010–2013
Jeffrey Kramer	Imperial College London	2006–2009
John C. Knight	University of Virginia	2002–2005
Anneliese A. Andrews	University of Denver	2000–2001
Richard Kemmerer	University of California, Santa Barbara	1996–1999
Nancy Leveson	Massachusetts Institute of Technology	1992–1995
Victor Basili	University of Maryland, College Park	1988–1991
C. V. Ramamoorthy	University of California, Berkeley	1984–1987
Laszlo A. Belady	Thomas J. Watson Research Center	1980–1983
Raymond T. Yeh	University of Maryland, College Park	1975–1979

== See also ==
- IEEE Software
- IET Software
