= Alexander Klebanov =

Kazakh businessman

- Александр Клебанов
- Born: April 27, 1962 (age 62); Almaty, KazSSR
- Citizenship: (Kazakhstan) Kazakh
- Occupation: Chairman of the Board of Directors Central Asian Electric Power Corporation

Alexander Yakovlevich Klebanov (born 27 April 1963, in Almaty, Kazakhstan) is a Kazakhstani businessman and sports functionary. He is a Chairman of Board of Directors of Central Asian Electric Power Corporation JSC since 2007.

According to Forbes, Alexander Klebanov is one of the top-ten most influential and richest businessmen of Kazakhstan.

== Education ==
In 1986 he graduated with honors from Almaty State Medical Institute.

== Entrepreneurship ==
He started his professional career as a junior research scientist in Almaty Research Institute of Skin and Venereal Diseases. Between 1996 and 2000 he was a director of the representative office of the company Airfinance Europe in Kazakhstan. Since 2000 till 2006 Klebanov was a director of State airline Berkut Air. Currently, he is a shareholder and chairman of the Board of Directors of Central Asian Fuel and Energy Company JSC, which unites a group of companies in the energy and financial sectors. Klebanov owns shares of JSC Kazakhtelecom.
