= UCoz =

uCoz
- Website type: Website Builder
- Available in: English, Russian, German, Spanish, French, Hungarian, Arabic, Romanian, Polish, Portuguese
- Headquarters: Moscow, Russia
- Owner: uCoz Media
- Employees: 100+
- Website: www.ucoz.com
- Registration: Required
- Users: 1.5 million
- Launched: 2005

uCoz (/ˈjʊkoʊz/) is a website builder developed and distributed by Ucoz Media LLC. The platform combines web hosting with a modular website-management system whose components can be used for pages, blogs, forums, online stores and other types of websites.

uCoz operates on a freemium model. A free plan provides hosting and core website-management features, while paid plans provide additional storage and functionality, including ad removal and, on selected plans, e-commerce, AI-assisted tools and server-side applications.

== History ==
The Russian-language uCoz project was started in 2005. In July 2007, Ucoz Media announced the international launch of the service; at the time, the company reported more than 100,000 active websites.

In 2007, investment fund Digital Sky Technologies (DST) acquired a stake in uCoz. According to Kommersant, DST paid more than US$3 million for a 30% stake, valuing the company at approximately US$10 million. Following the restructuring of DST's Russian assets, the investment became part of Mail.ru Group.

In 2013, Yandex transferred websites from its Yandex.Narod website-building and hosting service to uCoz. MediaNama reported that approximately two million Narod websites were transferred as part of the arrangement.

In April 2014, Mail.ru Group sold its approximately 26% stake in uCoz to outside investors; the buyers and the value of the transaction were not disclosed.

In 2015, uCoz launched uKit, a separate drag-and-drop website builder aimed primarily at small businesses and users without web-development experience.

On 20 September 2021, uCoz was entered in Russia's Unified Register of Russian Software under entry No. 11536. The register lists Ucoz Media LLC as the rights holder and classifies uCoz as software for content management, websites and portal solutions.

== Platform ==
uCoz is based on a modular architecture. Available components include page management, site news and blogs, forums, user management, file and article catalogues, photo albums, video, polls, forms, FAQs and online-store functionality. Individual modules can be enabled according to the requirements of a website.

Website owners can create and edit pages and modify design templates through the control panel. The platform includes a template code editor and controls for user-group permissions. Custom domains, FTP access and different levels of storage and functionality are provided according to the selected plan.

For integration with external applications, uCoz provides an application programming interface known as uAPI. The API provides programmatic access to supported components including users, pages, news, blogs, forums, content catalogues, online stores and other site functions. API requests use bearer-token authentication, and individual modules must be enabled for API access.

== Artificial intelligence and developer tools ==
uCoz provides AI Code, an AI-assisted tool for generating and modifying HTML, CSS and JavaScript used in uCoz templates. The assistant produces code from natural-language instructions while taking the platform's template structure, conditions and system variables into account.

The platform also supports the Model Context Protocol (MCP), allowing compatible AI clients to interact with a uCoz website through the platform's APIs. The MCP implementation provides tools for editing templates and pages, publishing content, managing online-store data and subscriptions, working with users and files, and enabling site modules, subject to the permissions associated with the API token.

The uCoz API documentation includes machine-readable OpenAPI specifications and files intended for integration with large language models and AI agents.

uCoz also provides an environment for running server-side applications alongside hosted websites. Supported runtimes include PHP 8, Node.js and Python. The environment also supports MySQL databases, FTP access and scheduled tasks using Cron. The website and server-side application environments operate separately but can interact with each other and can be managed through uAPI.

== Business model ==
The service uses a freemium business model. Its free plan includes hosting, a custom-domain option, FTP access and core site-management functions. Paid plans differ in storage limits and available features, with selected plans adding AI Code, server-side applications and online-store functionality.

According to the service's legal information, Ucoz Media LLC is the copyright holder. Compubyte Limited has the right to conclude sublicense agreements outside Russia, while UCOZ Ltd. processes payments for the service.

== Awards ==
- Third place in the "People's Ten" category of the 2008 Runet Prize.
- Winner of the "Technologies and Innovations" category of the 2009 Runet Prize.
- Winner of the "Best Site for Publishers" category at the 2009 Open Web Awards.
