= Parallels RAS =

Parallels Remote Application Server (RAS)
- Developer(s): Parallels
- Stable release: 19 (August 2022)
- Operating system: Microsoft Windows
- Type: Application virtualization
- License: Proprietary
- Website: www.parallels.com/ras

Parallels RAS is application virtualization software produced by Parallels that allows Windows applications to be accessed via individual devices from a shared server or cloud system. Parallels RAS was first released in 2014 by 2X Software.

== Product overview ==
Parallels RAS is application virtualization software that delivers centrally-hosted Windows applications to local devices without the necessity of installing them.

With Parallels RAS, Windows applications can be used on devices that typically could not run them, including Macintosh computers, mobile devices, and Google Chromebook.

Parallels RAS is accessed on all devices via Parallels Client. The software can be delivered from on-premises or public, private, or hybrid clouds.

== See also ==
- Parallels
- 2X Software
