= Katja Windt =

Katja Windt is a researcher and professor of global production logistics who served as president of Jacobs University Bremen from 2014 until 2018.

== Education ==
Windt received her doctorate in 2000 from the Institut für Fabrikanlagen und Logistik IFA (Institute of Production Systems and Logistics). During her studies she attended the Massachusetts Institute of Technology (MIT), Cambridge, Massachusetts, for one semester.

== Academic career ==
Windt held a position as departmental manager at the Bremer Institut für Produktion und Logistik BIBA, (Bremen Institute for Production and Logistics) of the University of Bremen, where she worked in the field of autonomous cooperating logistic processes funded by the German Research Foundation.

On the staff of Jacobs University since 2008, Windt founded the university's Global Production Logistics Workgroup. In 2008 she won the Alfried Krupp Prize, a grant for young lecturers. She was named "Professor of the year 2008" by the German Association of University Professors and Lecturers.

In 2012, Windt was appointed as provost and vice-president of Jacobs University. In 2014 she became president of the same institution, and oversaw a financial restructuring of the institution. She resigned from this position in 2018.

== Associations ==
Windt was a member and later a spokesperson of the Young Academy, a joint project of the Berlin-Brandenburg Academy of Sciences and Humanities and German Academy of Natural Scientists Leopoldina.

== Other activities ==
=== Corporate boards ===
- Deutsche Post, Member of the Supervisory Board (since 2011)
- Fraport, Member of the Supervisory Board (since 2012)
- BLG Logistics, Member of the Advisory Board
- Ford Otosan, Member of the Board

=== Non-profit organizations ===
- German Logistics Association (BVL), Member of the Executive Board
