= Fabio Pammolli =

Italian economist (born 1965)

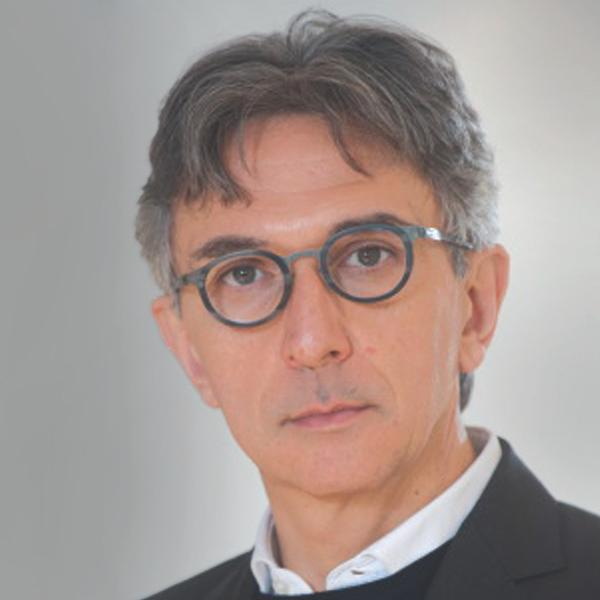
Professor Fabio Pammolli

Fabio Pammolli (born January 11, 1965, in Lucca) is an Italian economist, who since 2016 is professor of finance and data science at Politecnico di Milano, since November 2022 serves as economic advisor to the Minister of Finance and Economy of the Italian Republic and, since May 2024, President of The Italian Institute of Artificial Intelligence for Industry - AI4I.

== Biography ==
Pammolli graduated in economics at the University of Pisa and did his doctoral studies at the Sant’Anna School of Advanced Studies.

From 1990 to 2000 he served as an assistant and then as an associate professor at the University of Siena; from 2001 to 2004 he served as full professor at the University of Florence and from 2004 to 2015 he was a full professor at IMT School for Advanced Studies.

Research stays have taken him to the Department of Physics at Boston University, where he collaborated with H.E. Stanley.

He was then a visiting scientist at STICERD at the LSE, OFCE at Sciences Po, the Department of Economics, Harvard University and LIDS, at the Massachusetts Institute of Technology.

From 2004 to 2013 he served as the founding rector of the IMT School for Advanced Studies in Lucca and worked there as a professor of economics, finance, and data science.

In 2015 he served as a senior scientist at the Italian Institute of Technology, where he contributed to conceive and design the strategic plan of the Human Technopole.

In 2022 Pammolli was acting as the President of Constructor University (formerly Jacobs University) in Bremen, Germany. In the year of his presidency, Pammolli has successfully initiated a wealth of advancements at the university: he implemented a new organizational structure, initiated new study programs, and completed the transition from Jacobs to Constructor University.

In his research, Pammolli combines methods from statistical physics and economics. He has covered a wide range of topics, which includes the analysis of growth, diversification, instability of companies, economies and financial systems.

== Institutional Commitments ==
From 2015 to 2020 he was a member of the Investment Committee of the European Fund for Strategic Investments (EFSI) at the European Investment Bank.

From November 2021 onwards he serves as Chairperson of the Investment Committee of InvestEU, the European Commission's new stimulus plan to provide long-term finance for companies and support EU policies.

Since November 2022, he serves as economic adviser to the Italian Minister of Economy and Finance.

Since May 2024, he is president of the Italian Institute of Artificial Intelligence (AI4I), the national research facility on artificial intelligence.

He has served on the boards of directors of major corporations and as an advisor to private equity and infrastructure funds. In July 2025, he joined the Board of Directors of SACE. He has also been a regular op-ed contributor to leading Italian newspapers, including Corriere della Sera, Il Sole 24 Ore, La Stampa, and Il Foglio.

== Personal Life ==
Pammolli is married with three daughters, has golden retrievers, and takes long walks in the countryside. An ACF Fiorentina fan since he was four, he fell in love with Brian Clough and Archie Gemmill's legendary Nottingham Forest in the autumn of 1977 and has supported them ever since.

== Publications ==
Pammolli, F.; Maini, L. (2023-05-02). "Reference Pricing as a Deterrent to Entry: Evidence from the European Pharmaceutical Market". American Economic Journal. 15 (2): 345–383. doi:10.1257/mic.20210053. hdl:11311/1264588.

Pammolli, F.; Flori, A.; Spelta, A. (2021). "Commodity prices co-movements and financial stability: A multidimensional visibility nexus with climate conditions". Journal of Financial Stability. 54.

Pammolli, F.; Stanley, H.E.; Buldyrev, S.; Riccaboni, M. (2020). The Growth of Business Firms: A Stochastic Framework on Innovation, Creative Destruction and Growth. Cambridge University Press. ISBN 978-1107175488.

Pammolli, F.; Bonaccorsi, G.; Pierri, F.; Cinelli, M.; Flori, A.; Galeazzi, A.; Porcelli, F.; Schmidt, A.L.; Valensise, C.M.; Scala, A.; Quattrociocchi, W. (2020). "Economic and social consequences of human mobility restrictions under COVID-19". Proceedings of the National Academy of Sciences of the United States of America. 117 (27): 15530–15535. arXiv:2004.05455. Bibcode:2020PNAS..11715530B. doi:10.1073/pnas.2007658117. PMC 7355033. PMID 32554604.

Pammolli, F.; A. Spelta, A.; Flori, A.; Pecora, N.; Buldyrev, S. (2020). "A Behavioral Approach to Instability Pathways in Financial Markets". Nature Communications. 1 (1707). Bibcode:2020NatCo..11.1707S. doi:10.1038/s41467-020-15356-z. hdl:11311/1150730. PMC 7136275.

Pammolli, F.; Righetto, L.; Pelicci, P.G.; Pani, L.; Rabosio, E. (2020). "The Endless Frontier? The Recent Upsurge of R&D Productivity in Pharmaceuticals". Journal of Translational Medicine. 18 (1): 162. doi:10.1186/s12967-020-02313-z. PMC 7147016. PMID 32272953.

Pammolli, F.; Flori, A.; Buldyrev, S.E.; Stanley, H.E.; Regis, A. (2019-03-20). "Communities and Regularities in the Behaviour of Investment Fund Managers". Proceedings of the National Academy of Sciences. 116 (14): 6569–6574. Bibcode:2019PNAS..116.6569F. doi:10.1073/pnas.1802976116. PMC 6452657. PMID 30894494.

Pammolli, F.; Flori, A.; Giansante, S.; Girardone, C. (2019-09-24). "Banks Business Strategies on the Edge of Distress". Annals of Operations Research. 299 (1–2): 481–530. doi:10.1007/s10479-019-03383-z. hdl:10447/547299.
