= Mauro Pezzè =

Italian computer scientist

- Education: University of Pisa (MSc); Polytechnic University of Milan (PhD)
- Scientific career
- Fields: Software engineering, software testing
- Workplaces: Università della Svizzera italiana; Constructor Institute; Università degli Studi di Milano-Bicocca
- Website: www.inf.usi.ch/faculty/pezze/

Mauro Pezzè is an Italian computer scientist. He is a professor of the faculty of informatics at the Università della Svizzera italiana, Switzerland where he had been the dean of the faculty of informatics from 2009 to 2011. He is also a professor of software engineering at the Università degli Studi di Milano-Bicocca and, from 2019 to 2026, at the Constructor Institute in Schaffhausen. He has been co-chair of the International Conference on Software Engineering. Pezzè is the co-author of Software testing and analysis: process, principles, and techniques published by Wiley in 2007. His research interests are mainly software redundancy, self-healing and self-adaptive software systems. He was recognized as an ACM Distinguished Member in 2017. He was editor in chief of the journal ACM Transactions on Software Engineering and Methodology from 2018 to 2024. He is editor in chief of the journal IEEE Transactions on Software Engineering since January 1, 2026.
