= Serguei Netessine =

Professor

- Сергей Николаевич Нетесин
- Born: 1973 (age 52–53); Sarov, Russia
- Citizenship: United States
- Education: University of Rochester; Moscow Institute of Electronic Technology
- Awards: Manufacturing and Service Operations Management Distinguished Fellow Award, 2018
- Scientific career
- Fields: Operations management, Supply Chain Management, Innovation
- Workplaces: Wharton School of the University of Pennsylvania; INSEAD
- Thesis: (2001)
- Doctoral advisor: Nils Rudi, Yale University
- Website: www.netessine.com

Serguei Netessine is a scientist, educator, academic administrator and startup investor. He is Senior Vice Dean for Innovation and Global Initiatives and Dhirubhai Ambani Professor of Entrepreneurship and Innovation at the Wharton School of Business, University of Pennsylvania. Previously, he was Professor of Global Technology and Innovation at INSEAD and the Research Director of INSEAD-Wharton alliance. He is best known for his work on Business Model Innovation, Operational Excellence and Supply Chain Management.

== Early life and education ==
Netessine was born in Russia. In 1995 he graduated from Moscow Institute of Electronic Technology. As a Master of Science in Electrical Engineering he moved to the United States for doctoral studies in 1997. He graduated from the University of Rochester with a master's degree in Management Science in 2000 and with a doctoral degree in Operations Management in 2001. In the same year, he became a professor at the Wharton School of the University of Pennsylvania.

== Career ==
Netessine's career at the Wharton School lasted for 10 years, including receiving indefinite tenure in 2007. In 2010 he joined the faculty of INSEAD, business school and he returned to the Wharton School in 2017.

In May 2014 he became Executive Vice President and President-elect of The Manufacturing and Service Operations Management Society (MSOM) In 2015 he co-founded Responsible Research in Business and Management network. He also served as a research director of the INSEAD-Wharton alliance and a director of INSEAD-Wharton Center for Global Research & Education while at INSEAD.

Netessine was one of the department editors for the journal Management Science 2012-2017, and is a regular speaker and moderator at various industry conferences, including the World Knowledge Forum.

== Awards and honors ==
Netessine received various research and teaching awards, including:

- Miller-Sherrerd Teaching Award for top students' evaluations among MBA core courses at the Wharton School (multiple times).
- Production and Operations Management Society Wickham Skinner Early-Career Research Accomplishment Award, 2005.
- The 1st-place winner of Decision Sciences Institute Best Teaching Case Studies Award 2013.
- The winner of Young Scholar Prize 2013 awarded to the best researcher in operations management to a person 40 years of age or younger.
- Academy of Management Chan Han Best Paper in Operations Management Award 2011.
- Distinguished Fellow of M&SOM Society of INFORMS, 2018.

== Press coverage ==
Professor Netessine’s research has received media coverage in CIO Magazine, The Economist, Forbes, Multichannel Merchant, New York Times, Strategy+Business, US News, etc.

US Government Accountability Office cited his work on performance-based logistics when making recommendations for improvement of US Department of Defense.

== Bibliography ==
- Serguei Netessine (2001). Managing Product Variety in Inventory and Service Operations. PhD Thesis. University of Rochester. William E. Simon Graduate School of Business Administration.
- Serguei Netessine, Christopher S. Tang (2009). Consumer-driven demand and operations management models: a systematic study of information-technology-enabled sales mechanisms. New York, NY: Springer. p. 512. ISBN 9780387980263.
- Serguei Netessine (2009). The Network Challenge (Chapter 13): Supply Webs: Managing, Organizing, and Capitalizing on Global Networks of Suppliers. Pearson Education. p. 26. ISBN 9780137015078.
- Karan Girotra, Serguei Netessine (2014). The Risk-Driven Business Model: Four Questions That Will Define Your Company. Harvard Business Review Press. p. 224. ISBN 9781422191538.

Serguei Netessine has also authored or co-authored more than 50 publications in academic journals.
