= Acumatica =

Technology company

Acumatica, Inc.
- Type: Private
- Industry: Computer software
- Founded: 2008; 18 years ago
- Founder: Serguei Beloussov; Mike Shchelkonogov; John Howell
- Successor: EQT AB
- Headquarters: Bellevue, Washington, United States
- Key people: John Case (CEO)
- Products: Acumatica Cloud ERP
- Owner: EQT AB (2019–2025); Vista Equity Partners (2025–present)
- Number of employees: 600+ (2024)
- Website: www.acumatica.com

Acumatica, Inc. provides cloud and browser based enterprise resource planning software for small and medium-sized businesses. Headquartered in Bellevue, Washington, in the Seattle metropolitan area, it has partnerships with BDO USA MYOB and Shopify.

== History ==
The Acumatica ERP product was introduced in 2008 followed a year later by on-premises and SaaS versions. In 2014, when former Microsoft vice president Jon Roskil became its CEO, it launched its xRP cloud platform.

Two years before opening an office in London, the company was acquired in 2019 by the private equity fund EQT AB. In 2022, it named John Case, a former corporate vice president at Microsoft, as its new CEO.

Acumatica appointed two ERP industry veterans, Zach Nelson and Nancy Harris, to its Board of Directors in 2024. They joined a group of board members that included Case, Kim Clarke, Kathy Crusco, Robert Maclean, Tyler Parker and Jonas Persson.

In 2025 Acumatica was acquired by Vista Equity Partners, a global investment firm focused exclusively on enterprise software, data and technology-enabled businesses, for $2 billion.

== Technology ==
Previous logo

Acumatica's ERP is built with its proprietary web-based xRP platform and can be licensed on-premises / in the cloud, or provided on a SaaS basis.

The SaaS product runs on Amazon Web Services, Azure and SQL Azure. Licensed software runs on Microsoft Windows Server / SQL Server and applications run as .NET managed code.
