= Brainly =

Educational technology company

Brainly, Inc.
- Company type: Private
- Website type: Educational technology
- Available in: Hindi, English, Spanish, Portuguese (BR), French, Filipino (Tagalog), Turkish, Romanian, Russian, Polish, Italian, Indonesian, Ukrainian
- Founded: September 2009; 17 years ago
- Headquarters: New York City, United States; Kraków, Poland
- Area served: United States, India, Poland, Brazil, Indonesia, Latin America, Spain, Portugal, France, Romania, Ukraine, Philippines
- Creators: Michał Borkowski; Tomasz Kraus; Łukasz Haluch
- Key people: Michał Borkowski (President of the Management Board)
- Industry: Education
- Website: https://brainly.com/ https://brainly.pl/
- Users: 15 million daily active users (2024)

Brainly
- Stable release: For iOS:- Version 4.192.0 (October 21, 2025) For Android:- Version 5.269.0 (October 20, 2025)
- Operating system: iOS, Android
- Size: 51 MB (Android)
- Website: iOS Android
- As of: February 2022

Brainly is an education technology company founded in Kraków, Poland and headquartered in New York City.

== History ==
The company was founded in 2009 in Poland by Michał Borkowski (the current chief executive officer), Tomasz Kraus, and Łukasz Haluch. Initially starting as a peer-to-peer platform where students can ask questions and answer them for other students, Brainly has since repositioned as an AI-based learning platform for homework help, test prep, and tutoring.

In January 2011, the company founded Znanija.com, a Russian language version of the platform.

In June 2016, Brainly acquired the US-based OpenStudy.

In January 2018, Brainly announced the acquisition of the video education start-up Bask to incorporate video features into its platform.

In 2020, the company saw a significant increase in its number of users, attributed to the global COVID-19 pandemic, from 150 million in 2019 to approximately 350 million in 2020.

In 2020, numerous users on the Art of Problem Solving website found that Brainly had compromised the integrity of the American Mathematics Competitions after posting the questions on its website along with the correct answers. This led to Brainly updating its honor code.

As of 2020, the company had raised approximately $150 million in funding from investors.

In 2023, Brainly implemented artificial intelligence (AI) features for the platform.

In 2024, Brainly released Test Prep, a tool that generates practice questions for exams.

In 2025, Brainly evolved from a community-led platform into a comprehensive AI Learning Companion, introducing agentic AI support for homework help, tutoring, test preparation, and active classroom participation in the US. Other countries remained community-led.

== Features ==
Brainly supports searching for answers using photographs of questions. Brainly.com also allows users to compare Brainly answers with AI-generated responses from ChatGPT and Gemini within the platform.

== Criticism ==
ToS;DR (Terms of Service; Didn't Read), a project which analyzes terms of services (ToS) and privacy policies of websites, ranks Brainly at grade D.

== See also ==
- Economy of Poland
