= Panzar =

2013 video game

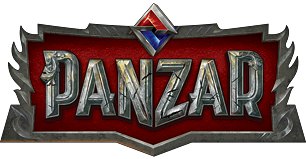
- Developer: Panzar Studio
- Publisher: Ovalis Investments
- Engine: CryEngine 3
- Platform: Microsoft Windows
- Release: April 12, 2013
- Genre: Action
- Mode: Multiplayer

Panzar is a massively multiplayer online game feat multiplayer online battle arena developed by Russian Panzar Studio for Microsoft Windows. It is a free-to-play game, supported by micro-transactions.

It has 15 PvP arenas where teams face off in 5 different game modes including domination, king of the hill and ball capture. Teams are composed of characters from 8 different classes, all with their own unique abilities and skills.
