= OpenAPI =

OpenAPI may refer to:

- Open API, a set of web technologies for inter-website communication
- OpenAPI Specification, a specification and complete framework implementation (formerly named Swagger) for describing, producing, consuming, and visualizing RESTful web services
