= Serg Bell =

Singaporean businessman

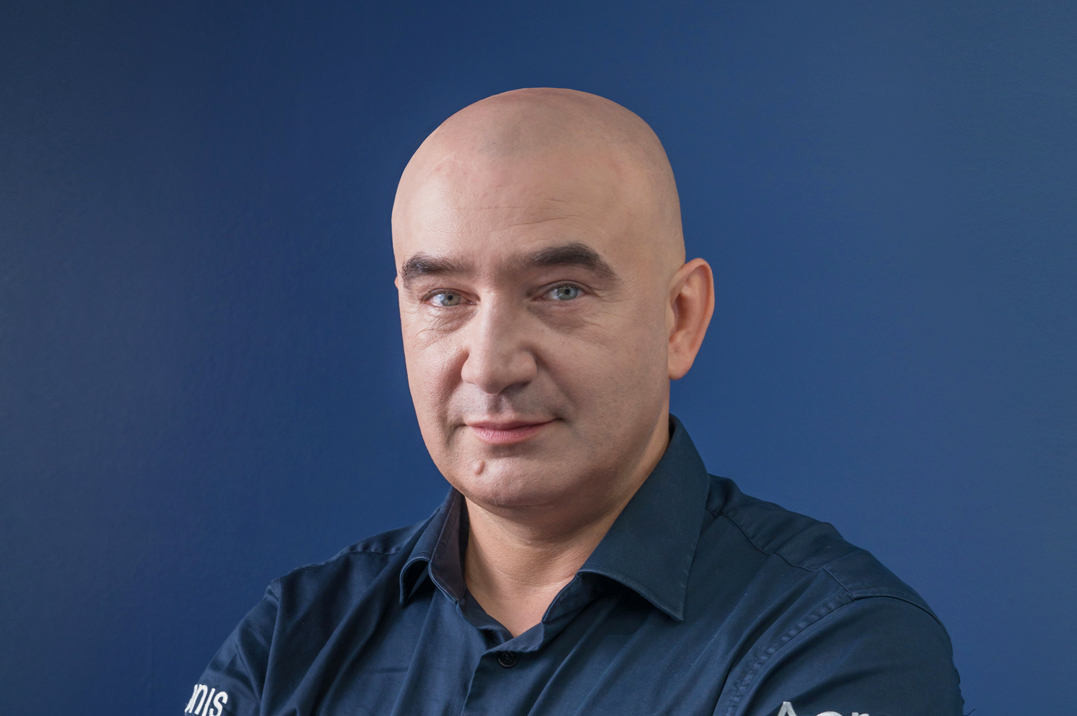
- Born: Sergey Mikhaylovich Belousov; August 2, 1971 (age 55); Leningrad, Russian SFSR, Soviet Union
- Other names: Serg Bell, SB
- Education: Moscow Institute of Physics and Technology
- Occupations: Businessman, investor, speaker, entrepreneur
- Years active: 1992–present
- Known for: Founder of Acronis
- Board member of: Parallels; Odin; Virtuozzo; Acumatica; Acronis
- Spouse: Oznur Bell
- Website: https://arici.com/

Serg Bell (born Sergey Mikhaylovich Belousov, Russian: Сергей Михайлович Белоусов, 2 August 1971) is a Singaporean businessman born in Leningrad, USSR, entrepreneur, investor and speaker, the founder and chairman of the board of Constructor Group (formerly known as Schaffhausen Institute of Technology (SIT)) and Constructor Tech and multiple global IT companies, including Acronis, a global data protection company, Virtuozzo, a cloud and virtualization software company he originally founded as SWsoft, and was the senior founding partner of Runa Capital, a technology investment firm. He is also executive chairman of the board and chief architect of Parallels, Inc., a virtualization technology company, co-founder and chairman of the board of Acumatica, an enterprise resource planning software (ERP) company, and co-founder of QWave Capital.

Serg co-authored over 350 patents. His h-index is 50.

In 2021 he officially changed his name to Serg Bell.

== Early life and education ==
Bell was born in 1971 in Leningrad and studied at the 45th Physics-Mathematics School. Bell later attended the Moscow Institute of Physics and Technology, graduating in 1992 with a bachelor's degree in physics. He received his master's degree in physics and electrical engineering in 1995, and a Ph.D. in computer science in 2007. Bell came to Singapore in 1994 and became a Singaporean citizen in 2001.

== Career ==
While earning his master's, Bell co-founded his first business, Unium (Phystech College), which provided science students with course materials. In 1992, he began working at a Russian computer company called Sunrise. Bell expanded the company's operations to 10 subsidiaries, becoming one of the largest PC retailers in Russia by the time he left in 1994. After leaving Sunrise, Bell founded and co-owned Solomon Software SEA. Solomon Software SEA was a distributor and developer arm of mid-market ERP vendor Solomon Software in Southeast Asia. Solomon Software was later acquired by Microsoft and is now known as Microsoft Dynamics SL.

In 2000, Bell founded SWsoft, a privately held server automation and virtualization software company and the then-parent company of Parallels, Inc. and Acronis, Inc.

Bell‘s family office is located in Luxembourg as Arici Lux Sarl.

=== Acronis ===
In 2001, Bell founded Acronis as a storage management business unit of SWsoft. In 2003, Acronis was reorganized as a separate entity focused on backup and data protection software. In 2022 Acronis employs over 2,000 people worldwide, and its products are available in 26 languages in over 150 countries.

Bell has served on the board of directors since 2002. From 2007 to 2011, he turned his focus on Parallels, acting as CEO of the company. During this time, he also founded a pair of venture capital funds, Runa Capital and QWave Capital. He returned as CEO of Acronis in May 2013, replacing former CEO Alex Pinchev.

Chief Constructor & Founder & Executive Board Member of Acronis, SB previously served as Acronis’ Chief Executive Officer from 2013-2021. As of July 1, 2021, SB has stepped down as CEO of Acronis to focus on the company’s technology and research strategy as Chief Research Officer.

=== Parallels, Inc. ===
Parallels, Inc. was initially a server automation and virtualization software unit of SWsoft before it was spun off into a separate entity and maintained its own distinct branding. In December 2007, SWsoft announced its plans to change its name to Parallels and ship both companies' products under the Parallels name. The merger was formalized in January 2008. From 2007 to 2013, Bell led the company as CEO while remaining on the board of directors at Acronis.

Bell stepped down as CEO and serves as the executive chairman of the board and chief architect of Parallels, Inc. The company has more than 900 employees across offices in North America, Europe, Australia, and Asia, and as of 2012 it had 5,000 customers and partners worldwide. Odin Automation, a service automation platform company owned by Parallels and founded by Beloussov, was sold to Ingram Micro in December 2015.

=== Runa Capital ===
Bell co-founded Runa Capital in 2010 together with university mates Dmitry Chikhachev and Ilya Zubarev. The three put in around $30 million in addition to capital raised from friends, family members, private investors, Goldman Sachs, UBS, etc. The firm invested in Europe and USA-based startups in the fields of deep tech, open-source software, machine learning, quantum computing, finance, education, and healthcare. By 2022, Runa Capital raised around $500 million for 4 funds and made over 100 early-stage investments. Bell was also the venture partner of Qwave, a quantum computing-focused venture fund, which effectively served as the "material science arm" of Runa Capital.

Since 2013, Bell scaled down executive functions in Runa Capital to focus on Acronis. In 2023, he stepped down as the general partner and stopped his involvement with the firm.

=== Constructor Group ===
Bell founded Schaffhausen Institute of Technology in 2019 in Switzerland. Schaffhausen Institute of Technology is an international research-led university for selected areas in computer science, physics, and technology transformation. Due to slow development in Switzerland and for expansion of the market, Bell invested in the private Constructor University (formerly Jacobs) in Bremen, Germany, becoming its major shareholder. Constructor has yet to recover.

=== Virtuozzo ===
Bell founded Virtuozzo as part of SWsoft (later Parallels), where it served as the core enabling technology behind SWsoft's HSP Complete solution. In 2000, the company released the first commercially available operating system-level virtualization container technology. In December 2015, Virtuozzo was spun out from Parallels to become a standalone company, and it is now positioned as a provider of infrastructure system software for AI and cloud computing.

In 2024, Bell returned to Virtuozzo as chief executive officer. He stepped down from the role in 2025, and Kurt Daniel was appointed CEO, while Bell remained the company's founder, chairman, and chief constructor.

== Other ventures ==
Bell is a co-founder at Acumatica, a global cloud ERP company founded in 2007 with headquarters in Bellevue, Washington.

In 2012, Bell co-founded QWave Capital. The company's headquarter is in Boston. QWave Capital has over $300 million in funds and has invested in four quantum technology companies: ID Quantique, Nano Meta Technologies, Clifton and Centrice.

Between 2012 and 2017, Bell sat on the Governing Board of the Centre for Quantum Technologies. The Singapore-based research institute is a Research Centre of Excellence hosted by the National University of Singapore. The Centre brings together quantum physicists and computer scientists to explore the quantum nature of reality and the fundamental limits of information processing.

In 2021, he contributed to funding a new quantum computer startup company, QuEra, which is developing a 256-qubit machine.

== See also ==
- Acronis
- Parallels, Inc.
- Virtuozzo
- Runa Capital
- Acumatica
- Constructor, formerly known as Schaffhausen Institute of Technology
