= Kazakhtelecom =

Kazakh telecommunications company

JSC Kazakhtelecom
- Type: Public
- Traded as: KASE: KZTK
- Industry: Telecommunications
- Founded: 1994
- Headquarters: Astana, Kazakhstan
- Key people: Bağdat Musin, CEO (2024)
- Revenue: ▲142.236 billion tenge (2008)
- Operating income: ▲10.581 billion tenge (2008)
- Net income: ▲22.826 billion tenge (2008)
- Website: www.telecom.kz

Kazakhtelecom JSC (Kazakh: Қазақтелеком, romanized: Qazaqtelekom; Russian: Казахтелеком) is a state-owned company and the largest telecommunications company in Kazakhstan.

== History ==
Kazakhtelecom was founded in 1994 as a fully-state-owned company, but became a joint-stock company in 2004, with the Kazakh government retaining a 51% stake.

Kazakhtelecom joined the United Nations Global Compact in 2025.

Alongside Azeri telecommunications provider AzerTelecom, Kazakhtelecom began construction of a trans-Caspian fibre-optic cable link in 2025.

== Ownership ==
The majority owner of Kazakhtelecom is Samruk-Kazyna, the Kazakh sovereign wealth fund. Significant stakes were held by Dutch-registered companies Bodam and Deran Services BV, which were purchased by UK-based Sobrio Limited, owned by Alexander Klebanov, in 2016. The company is also listed on the Kazakhstan Stock Exchange.

Following the resignation of Nursultan Nazarbayev in 2019, Nazarbayev's nephew Kairat Satybaldy gifted his 28.8% stake in Kazakhtelecom, owned through Skyline Investment Company and Alatau Capital Investment, to the Kazakh government in an attempt to avoid prison for corruption charges.

Other companies owning stakes in Kazakhtelecom include the Bank of New York Mellon, Jusan Bank, and the Nazarbayev University Social Development Fund.

== Subsidiaries ==
=== Mobile Telecom Services ===
In 2007, Kazakhtelecom launched GSM mobile network operator Mobile Telecom Services, which operated under the Tele2 and Altel brands. It sold a 51% stake in MTS to Tele2 in 2010; the remaining 49% stock was owned by AsiaNet Kazakhstan, which sold its stake to Tele2 as well in 2015. Tele2 exited Kazakstan in 2019, and MTS reverted to Kazakhtelecom. MTS was again sold in its entirety in 2024 to Qatari firm Power International Holding for US$1.1 billion as part of a bilateral agreement between Qatar and Kazakhstan.

=== Kcell ===
In 2018, following a corruption scandal in Uzbekistan involving Swedish telecommunications provider Telia Company, Kazakhtelecom purchased a 51% stake in Telia's Kazakh subsidiary Kcell.

== See also ==
- List of mobile network operators of the Asia Pacific region#Kazakhstan
