= Mark Kamlet =

American political scientist

Mark S. Kamlet is an American political scientist currently the University Professor of Economics and Public Policy at Heinz College, Carnegie Mellon University and an Elected Fellow of the American Association for the Advancement of Science.
