= Kcell =

Kazakh telecommunications company

- Type: Public company
- Traded as: KASE: KCEL; LSE: KCEL
- Industry: Telecommunications
- Founded: September 30, 1998; 28 years ago
- Headquarters: Almaty, Kazakhstan
- Key people: Askhat Uzbekov (Chief Executive Officer)
- Products: Cellular communication, broadband Internet access, MFS, OTT-services
- Net income: ▼33 billion tenge (2023)
- Owner: Kazakhtelecom (75%)
- Number of employees: 2517 employees (2024)
- Website: www.kcell.kz, activ.kz

Kcell (KASE: KCEL) is the Cellular Communication Operator in Kazakhstan, part of Kazakhtelecom.

The company was founded in 1998 and provides cellular services under the Kcell brand, which is mainly focused on the corporate segment, and Activ, which is focused on the B2C segment. Subscriber base of the Kcell was equal to 9 986 thousand people as of December 31, 2016.

== History ==
The Kcell company was founded on September 30, 1998.

February 7, 1999 – launch of the Kcell brand.

September 9, 1999 – launch of the Activ brand.

In 2004 the subscriber base of the company exceeded 1.5 million people.

In December 2007 the subscriber database reached 6 million subscribers. In the same year all inhabited localities with a population of 5000 people were provided with communication.

In 2009 the Kcell corporate brand was restyled.

In 2010 the Kcell was chosen as the official mobile operator of the OSCE Summit and the 7th Asian Winter Games 2011.

In 2011 the 3G network from the Kcell was deployed in 31 cities of Kazakhstan. 94% of the populated area was covered with the Kcell network signal.

December, 2012 – successful listing of the company shares (KCEL marketing year) on KASE (Kazakhstan Stock Exchange) and on I, LSE (London Stock Exchange).

2013 – Kcell became a winner of the “Best IPO in Central and Eastern Europe” nomination according to EMEA Finance magazine.

2014 – Kcell JSC was recognized as the major taxpayer of the country in the non-energy industry.

At the end of May 2014 the Kcell became an official distributor of iPhone smartphones in Kazakhstan.

2015 – Kcell announced about opening of the first brand store in Almaty – Kcell Store.

New format of the store allows clients to receive information about various mobile devices and applications from Kcell consultants, as well as to test capabilities of smartphones on-site before making purchase.

2016 – Kcell signed the agreement with the Beeline Kazakhstan (VimpelCom group) on mutual use of networks for cooperative launch of the 4G/LTE services in Kazakhstan. This strategic partnership will allow the Kcell company to carry out operational launch of the 4G/LTE services in all major regions of the country by combining networks of two operators.

In 2016, the Kcell received nomination from Kazakhstan Stock Exchange (KASE) for high level of transparency and disclosure of information.

In the first half of 2017, 6.5 million residents of 20 cities of Kazakhstan are under the area of 4G/LTE signal coverage from the Kcell JSC.

In March 2025, Kcell signed a strategic partnership agreement with e&International, the global division of UAE-based telecommunications group e&, during the Mobile World Congress in Barcelona. The agreement aims to accelerate Kazakhstan’s digital transformation by enabling Kcell to adopt global best practices in network operations, digital services, and customer experience.

== Owners and management ==
Kcell JSC is a part of the JSC Kazakhtelecom.

Since February 2019 to January 2021 Kaspars Kukelis was the CEO of Kcell.

Since February 6, 2021, the Board of Directors of the company decided to appoint Yury Evgenievich Kharlamov to the position of Chief Executive Officer, Chairman of the Management Board of Kcell JSC

On May 11, 2022, the Board of Directors of Kcell elected Askhat Uzbekov to the position of Chief Executive Officer, Chairman of the Board of Kcell JSC.

== Activity ==
The main activity is provision of cellular communication services and mobile Internet.

The company has been constantly expanding the coverage area of the network signal during 19 years of work at the market.

In 2016, the Kcell started deployment of the commercial 4G / LTE network, which was significantly speeded up due to signing of the agreement on joint building of the 4G/LTE network with the Beeline Kazakhstan. This agreement allowed to provide high quality of services at simultaneous reducing of the required capital costs and rapid accelerating the network deployment process. By the end of December 2016, coverage of the 4G/LTE network from Kcell reached 35% of population of Kazakhstan.

In the first half of 2017, residents of Ridder, Taraz, Turkestan, Kyzylorda, Petropavlovsk, Shemonaikha and Ekibastuz got access to high-speed mobile 4G/LTE internet. From May 12, 2017, the company began to develop the 4G+ (LTE Advanced) network.

In the beginning of 2016, the development of entertaining OTT services for the mobi line (mobi TV, mobi music, mobi press, mobi kino, Bookmate) began.

== NPS ==
Regular research, conducted for us by the Brief agency for 2016, shows (cNPS – project on measurement of the Loyalty and Satisfaction Index of subscribers of cellular operators of Kazakhstan) that Activ brand has stable cNPS results and it remains a leader on satisfaction and loyalty of consumers. Annual average dynamics of the Kcell brand for 2016 is positive as well.

== Corporate and social responsibility ==
The Kcell JSC has been implementing social projects for 17 years. The company is a member of the United Nations Global Compact and implements social projects upon the following directions:

- support of digital entrepreneurship and innovations
- provision of everybody with possibility for education
- rendering assistance in building the healthy and safe society

Within 10 years, the company implemented charitable SMS projects in which any subscriber of the company can participate.

The project “Breath life” of the Ayala Private Charity Foundation was directed at fund raising in order to purchase medical equipment for the children's intensive therapy units of hospitals and birth centers of Kazakhstan. Short number – 9962.

The project “Helping hand” of the Shugyla Public Fund is organized for social assistance to low-income families, children who were left without parental care, lonely elderly people and disabled people all over Kazakhstan. Short number – 9191.

The project “Give children life” of the Mercy Volunteer Society Public Fund – fund raising for conduction of operations outside Kazakhstan for children who are not able to receive assistance from Kazakhstan doctors. Short number – 9099.

The project "We will win autism!" of the Mercy Volunteer Society Public Fund – for social adaptation of children who were diagnosed with autism. Short number – 6486.

Besides, short number 9777 of the Red Crescent Society of the Republic of Kazakhstan Public Association, which aimed to rendering the charitable assistance to low-income families and citizens affected by natural and man-made disasters and other emergencies in the territory of the Republic of Kazakhstan, as well as for other events in accordance with the Company's charter.

For more than 10 years the Kcell company has been a general partner of the Special Olympics Kazakhstan Public Association and annually sponsors conduction of the Camp Shriver sports and health camp for children with intellectual disabilities. In summer of 2017, 70 children took part in the camp.

Also, the company has been a committed partner of the TED x Almaty conference for 7 years.

Kcell states that education is a priority of its corporate social responsibility strategy. As part of this, the company launched openu.kz, which it describes as the first massive open online course platform in Kazakhstan. It offers free online courses in IT, business and telecommunications, taught by professors from universities in Kazakhstan, including Kazakh-British Technical University, AlmaU, SDU, Satpayev KazNRTU and the Institute of Mathematics and Mathematical Modeling.

Kcell has implemented the project on digital mobile literacy “Digital Life” for three years. 230 free master classes on such themes as mobile media, mobile security, mobile education, mobile state, mobile business, as well as the course for involvement of older population in the digital communication “Atashki, apashki and smartphone” were conducted within this project.

Free mobile application “Situational Kazakh” was launched for everyone wishing to learn Kazakh language with the support of the company.

And free mobile application “The Great Silk Way” helps to take a historical walk to the Great Silk Way's times and study development of caravan trade between the East and West in the territory of Kazakhstan from the 2nd century BC to the 15th century AD. This application became an excellent thing helping domestic and foreign tourists to travel over Kazakhstan and Middle Asia, as well as for all Kazakh pupils, studying national history.

Kcell was selected as the Official Mobile Operator of the 28th Winter Universiade 2017. The company provided uninterruptible network operation on sport facilities, provided 4 thousand volunteers and organizing committee with communication, as well as with the unified information contact-center for obtainment of information about all competitions and activities of the Universiade for Kazakh people and guests of the country.
