= Parallels (company) =

Swiss software company

Parallels International GmbH
- Type: Private
- Industry: Virtualization
- Genre: Virtualization and Hosting Automation
- Founded: 1999; 27 years ago
- Founders: Serg Bell
- Headquarters: Schaffhausen, Switzerland
- Key people: Christa Quarles (CEO)
- Products: Parallels Desktop for Mac; Parallels RAS; Parallels Browser Isolation
- Revenue: US$100+ million
- Owner: KKR
- Number of employees: 400+
- Website: parallels.com

Parallels International GmbH is a software company based in Schaffhausen, Switzerland. It is involved in the development of virtualization software for Data Centers/Clouds as well as Endpoints. The company has over 400 employees and operates globally, with notable businesses in the United States, Canada, Brazil, Latin America, Germany, Austria, United Kingdom, France, Italy, Spain, Norway, Sweden, UAE, India, Japan, Australia, and Mauritius

== History ==
SWSoft, a privately held server automation and virtualization software company, developed software for running data centers, particularly for web-hosting service companies and application service providers. Their Virtuozzo product was an early system-level server virtualization technology, in 2003, they acquired Plesk, a commercial web hosting platform.

SWSoft acquired Parallels, Inc. in 2004, but this information was not made public until January 2007. Parallels Workstation for Windows and Linux 2.0 was released in the same year, with Parallels Desktop for Mac following in mid-2006. Later the same year, the corporate headquarters moved from Herndon, Virginia, to Renton, Washington. Historically, their primary development labs were in Moscow and Novosibirsk, Russia. Parallels was founded by Serg Bell, who was born in the former Soviet Union and later immigrated to Singapore.

At Apple's Worldwide Developers Conference 2007 in San Francisco, California, Parallels announced and demonstrated its upcoming Parallels Server for Mac. Parallels Server for Mac allows IT managers to run multiple server operating systems on a single Mac Xserve.

In 2007, there were reports of a lawsuit by the German company Netsys GmbH against Parallels' German distributor Avanquest for alleged copyright violation of two virtualization products that Parallels developed for Netsys, twoOStwo and SVISTA. Parallels Server for Mac was announced at WWDC, and later Parallels Technology Network.

In 2008, SWSoft merged with Parallels to become one company under the Parallels branding, which then acquired ModernGigabyte, LLC. Parallels Server for Mac was launched in June, then in September Parallels Desktop 4 for Windows and Linux, a rename of Parallels Workstation for the 4.0 release, and Parallels Desktop 4.0 for Mac later that year. In the next version, 6.0, the Windows and Linux software became known as Parallels Workstation again.

From 2009 to 2011, the company launched Parallels Desktop 5 for Mac, Parallels Desktop 6 for Mac, Parallels Server for Mac 4.0 Mac mini edition, Parallels Transporter, Parallels Workstation 6 Extreme, Parallels Desktop 7 for Mac, Parallels Mobile for iOS, and Parallels Workstation 6.

During 2012, 2013 and 2014, the company discontinued Parallels Server for Mac, Windows and Linux, launched Parallels Desktop 8 for Mac and Mac Management for Microsoft System Center Configuration Manager, and released Parallels Desktop 10 for Mac.

Parallels acquired 2X Software in February 2015, rebranded their service provider business to Odin, later sold the Odin Service Automation Platform to Ingram Micro. They also released Parallels Mac Management v4.0 for Microsoft SCCM and Parallels Desktop 11 for Mac.

In 2017, Virtuozzo and Plesk, two products from the pre-Parallels history of SWSoft, were spun out.

In December 2018, Corel announced that it had acquired Parallels.

On October 20, 2020, it was announced that Google had partnered with Parallels to bring Windows applications to enterprises and cloud workers using Chrome Enterprise.

On February 17, 2023, Microsoft announced a partnership with Parallels to enable Windows 11 support on Mac computers with M-Series processors using Parallels Desktop 18.

On January 30, 2024, the company announced the new product Parallels DaaS.

On March 12, 2024, the company announced the new product Parallels Browser Isolation.

In February 2026, the company was split from Corel, with Parallels remaining under the ownership of KKR.

== Products ==
- Parallels Desktop for Mac – an x86 and ARM virtualization platform for macOS.
- Parallels RAS – an application virtualization program allowing Windows applications to be accessed via individual devices from a shared server or cloud system.
- Parallels Toolbox – a productivity suite for Windows and macOS.
- Parallels Access – was a remote desktop platform allowing iOS and Android devices to connect to Windows and macOS devices, which was sunset on April 30, 2024.
- Parallels Desktop for ChromeOS – a Windows virtualization platform for ChromeOS.
- Parallels Desktop as a Service – a cloud-native, Desktop as a service solution that offers users secure, instant access to their virtual applications and desktop environments.
