= Telecommunications in Uzbekistan =

Telecommunications Republic of Uzbekistan
Landlines (2011):	1.928 million
Mobile lines (2011):	25.442 million
ccTLD:	.uz
Calling code:	+998

Telecommunications networks in Uzbekistan are largely based on Soviet-built infrastructure, but with many modern additions, making the country one of the leading influences in the region in terms of information development.

In 2012, the telecommunications services volume grew by 22.5% year-on-year in Uzbekistan. The number of broadband ports installed totalled 378,000 across the country at the end of 2012, up by 55.5% year-on-year. The number of ports in active use was 202,700, up by 37.2%. A total of 1,576 km of fibre optic backbone lines were deployed across the country in the same year.

== Telephone ==
There are digital exchanges in large cities and rural areas.

=== Domestic system ===
The main line telecommunications system is dilapidated, and telephone density is low. The state-owned telecommunications company, Uztelecom, has used loans from the Japanese government and the China Development Bank to improve mainline services. The conversion to digital exchanges was completed in 2010. Mobile services are growing rapidly, with the subscriber base reaching 25 million in 2011.

=== International system ===
Uzbekistan is linked by fiber-optic cable or microwave radio relay to CIS member states, and to other countries by leased connection via the Moscow international gateway switch. Following the completion of the Uzbek link to the Trans-Asia-Europe (TAE) fibre-optic cable, Uzbekistan plans to establish a fibre-optic connection to Afghanistan.

== Radio ==
Currently, Uzbekistan has four AM stations, twelve FM stations, and three shortwave stations. Additionally, as of 1997, there were an estimated 10.2 million radios in use in Uzbekistan.

== Television ==
Uzbekistan has 28 television broadcast stations. This includes one cable rebroadcaster in Tashkent and approximately 20 stations in regional capitals. The National Television and Radio Company of Uzbekistan is the state television channel of Uzbekistan. Other country-wide television stations include Aqlvoy, MY5, and Sevimli.

== Internet ==
During the presidency of Islam Karimov, local websites peaked in the late 2000s and early 2010s; Olam.uz collaborated with the government in 2012, and there was still a significant amount of self-censorship practised by Uzbek portals at the time.

Internet access in Uzbekistan has developed significantly since the new president, Shavkat Mirziyoyev, came to power. Compared to the past, people can now access Instagram, Facebook, Twitter, and many other social networks without restrictions. The new president has opened up the country to foreign direct investment (FDI) and has introduced tax incentives for businesses to improve the private sector. He has also addressed connectivity issues and invested considerable effort in improving internet connections and mobile access within the country.
