= Acronis =

Swiss cybersecurity and data protection technology company

Acronis International GmbH
- Type: Privately held company
- Industry: Software
- Founded: 2003
- Founder: Serg Bell (Primary)
- Headquarters: Schaffhausen, Switzerland
- Key people: Warren Adelman (Chairman); Prakash Panjwani (CEO)
- Products: Acronis True Image, Acronis Cyber Protect, Acronis Cyber Protect Cloud, Acronis Cyber Files Cloud, Acronis Cyber Disaster Recovery
- Owner: EQT (majority stake, 2025–present)
- Number of employees: 1800+ (2024)
- Website: www.acronis.com

Acronis International GmbH is a Swiss global technology company specializing in cybersecurity and data protection software. Headquartered in Schaffhausen, Switzerland, the company develops solutions for backup, disaster recovery, endpoint management, and cybersecurity for managed service providers (MSPs), small- and medium-sized businesses (SMBs), and enterprise IT environments. In 2025, Swedish private equity firm EQT acquired a majority stake in Acronis.

Acronis products support platforms such as Microsoft 365, Google Workspace, AWS, and Azure.

== History ==
Acronis was founded in 2003 by Serg Bell, Stanislav Protassov, and Ilya Zubarev. as a spin-off from SWsoft (later known as Parallels), initially focusing on disk imaging and backup with its flagship product, Acronis True Image. It was incorporated in Switzerland in 2008.

The company expanded through acquisitions, including GroupLogic in 2012, BackupAgent and nScaled in 2014. According to the company, Acronis True Image 2017 New Generation was the first personal backup software to include behavioral-based anti-ransomware protection through its “Acronis Active Protection” feature, along with blockchain-based file notarization via “Acronis Notary.”

Further acquisitions included 5nine Software in 2019, and DeviceLock and CyberLynx in 2020. That same year, Acronis launched its Cyber Protect platform, integrating backup and cybersecurity. The company supports integrations with platforms such as ConnectWise and Microsoft Azure.

== Financials ==
In 2019, Acronis raised $147 million from Goldman Sachs, reaching a valuation of over $1 billion. A 2021 funding round of $250 million led by CVC Capital Partners increased its valuation to over $2.5 billion.

In 2025, Acronis became majority-owned by EQT, a Swedish private equity firm headquartered in Stockholm. According to CEO Ezequiel Steiner, EQT's investment brings additional management "brain power" along with an enhanced understanding of the broader market, best practices, and benchmarking to Acronis. The acquisition is subject to federal regulatory approvals expected in 2025.

== Operations ==
Acronis maintains offices in North America, Europe, Asia, and the Middle East, with R&D centers in Bulgaria, the United States, Israel, and Singapore. It operates a global network of cloud data centers and supports over 20,000 service providers protecting approximately 750,000 businesses worldwide.

On September 15, 2025, the US Director of National Intelligence ordered the exclusion and removal of all Acronis products and services from the Intelligence Community. And on October 30, 2026, the US Department of Homeland Security expanded the order to all Federal Civilian Executive Branches citing "significant risk to US Government information systems."

== Leadership ==
On 15 October 2026, Prakash Panjwani was appointed CEO of Acronis, succeeding Jan-Jaap "JJ" Jager. Panjwani previously served as CEO of WatchGuard Technologies and SafeNet.

Jager had succeeded Ezequiel Steiner as CEO in November 2025. Following the appointment of Panjwani, Acronis announced that Jager would remain a shareholder.

Warren Adelman serves as chairman of the Acronis Board of Directors. Following EQT's majority acquisition, EQT partner Johannes Reichel serves as a strategic board representative.

== Recognition ==
- In 2005, PC World awarded Acronis True Image 8.0 its World Class Award.
- In 2017, Time Magazine recognized Acronis True Image as a leading cloud-based backup service.
- In 2025, Acronis was named to CRN’s Security 100 list for the fourth consecutive year.

== Governance ==
As of the spring of 2026, the following individuals serve on the Acronis Board of Directors:

- Warren Adelman – Chair (USA)
- Johannes Reichel – EQT (Germany)
- Daniel Williamson – CVC Capital Partners (Italy)
- Holger Staude – Springcoast Partners (USA)
- Charles Ryan (USA)
- Stefan Gaiser (Germany)
- Jochen Berger (Germany)

== See also ==
- Comparison of disk cloning software
- List of disk cloning software
- List of disk partitioning software
