= Internet in Russia =

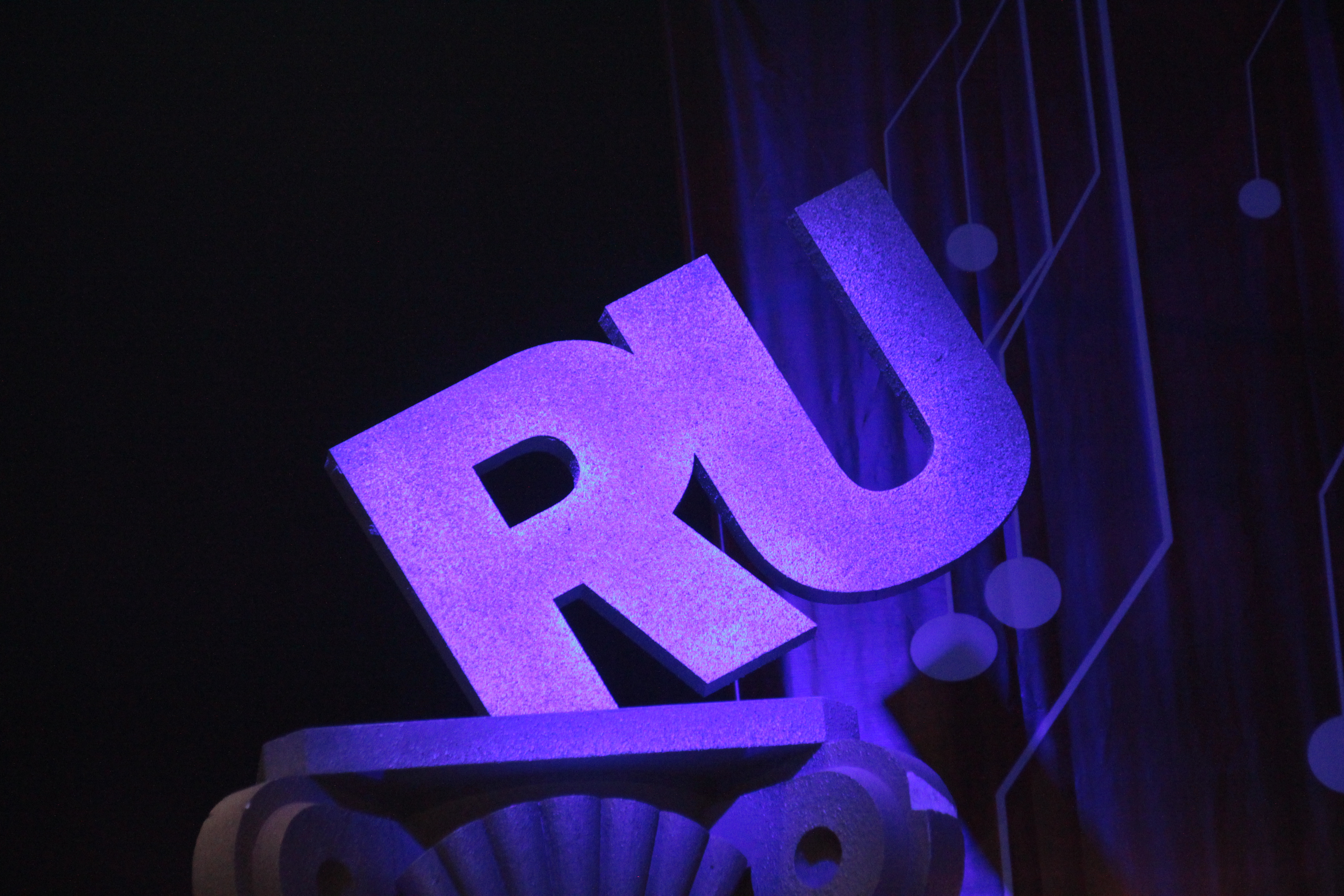
Runet logo at the 2009 Runet Prize ceremony

Internet in Russia, or Russian Internet (Russian: российский Интернет, romanized: rossiyskiy Internet, lit. 'Russia-related Internet'), and sometimes Runet (a portmanteau of "Russian" and "Internet"), is the part of the Internet that is related to the Russian Federation. As of 2015, Internet access in Russia is available to businesses and home users in various forms, including dial-up, cable, DSL, FTTH, mobile, wireless and satellite.

As of 2020, 122,488,468 Russians (85% of the country's total population) were Internet users. As of September 2020, Russia ranked 47th among the world's countries by the fixed broadband Internet access speed, with an average download speed of 75.91 mbit/s, and 88th by mobile network Internet access speed, with 22.83 mbit/s. According to Freedom House, the Internet in Russia is "Not Free" as of 2019. In September 2011, Russia overtook Germany on the European market with the highest number of unique visitors online. In March 2013, a survey found that Russian had become the second-most commonly used language on the web after English.

Russians are strong users of social networks, of which Odnoklassniki.ru (used by 75% of 25–35-year-old Russians in 2009) and VKontakte are the most popular. LiveJournal has also been long popular. Online gaming is widespread. Since 2022, the country's online ecosystem has developed independently and cultivated its own local digital economy. Due to political factors, and citing reasons such as information security and anti-fraud measures, the authorities have implemented new policies. Accessing international websites has become increasingly difficult, while a large number of users have turned to domestic alternatives.

== History ==
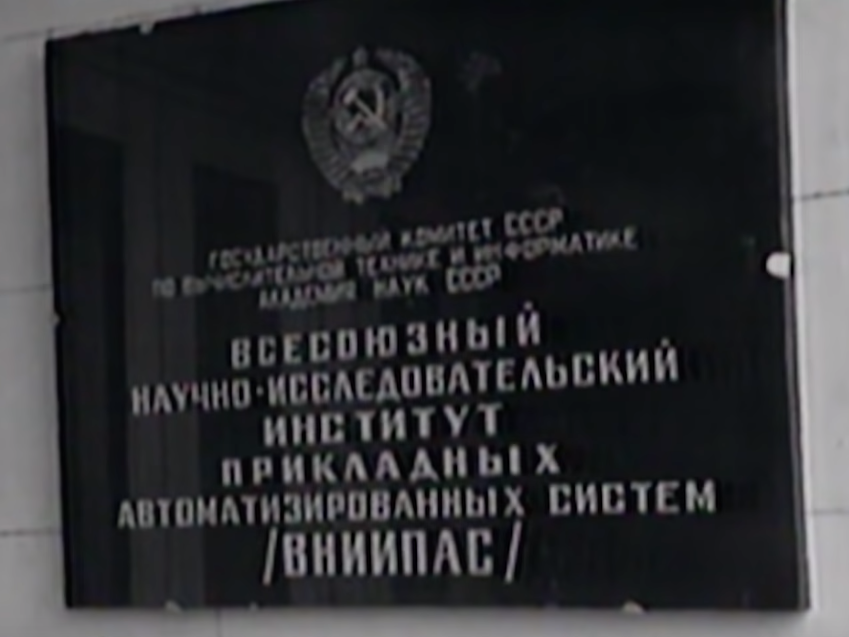
VNIIPAS signboard filmed in 1988 by Anatole Klyosov

=== Early years ===
Retrospectively, networking of data in the Russian language can be traced to the spread of mail and journalism in Russia, and information transfer by technical means came with the telegraph and radio. An 1837 sci-fi novel The Year 4338: Petersburg Letters, by the 19th-century Russian philosopher Vladimir Odoevsky, contains predictions such as "friends' houses are connected by means of magnetic telegraphs that allow people who live far from each other to talk to each other" and household journals "having replaced regular correspondence" with "information about the hosts’ good or bad health, family news, various thoughts and comments, small inventions, as well as invitations." In 1832, Russian inventor Semyon Korsakov presented the world's first mechanical devices for information retrieval using punched cards, which had previously been used only in the textile industry.

Computing systems became known in the USSR by the 1950s. Starting from 1952, work was conducted in the Moscow-based Institute of Precision Mechanics and Computer Engineering (headed by Sergei Lebedev) on automated missile defense system which used a computer network which calculated radar data on test missiles through central machine called M-40 and was interchanging information with smaller remote terminals about 100—200 kilometers distant. The scientists used several locations in the USSR for their works, the largest was a massive test range to the West from Lake Balkhash known as Sary Shagan. In the meantime amateur radio users all over USSR were conducting P2P connections with their comrades worldwide using data codes. Later, a massive automated data network called Express was launched in 1972 to serve the needs of Russian Railways.

From the early 1980s the All Union Scientific Research Institute for Applied Computerized Systems (VNIIPAS) was working to implement data connections over the X.25 telephone protocol to form the USSR-wide Academset. An official scientific Soviet digital data connection from VNIIPAS to Austria's IIASA existed since 1982, in 1982 and 1983 there were a series of world computer conferences at VNIIPAS initiated by the U.N. where the USSR was represented by a team of scientists from many Soviet Republics headed by biochemist Anatoly Klyosov. The other participating countries were the UK, USA, Canada, Sweden, FRG, GDR, Italy, Finland, Philippines, Guatemala, Japan, Thailand, Luxembourg, Denmark, Brazil and New Zealand.

Also, in 1983 the San Francisco Moscow Teleport (SFMT) was started by VNIIPAS and an American team which included Joel Schatz, Michael Kleeman and Chet Watson with initial financial support from Henry Dakin. SFMT provided email service using the PeaceNet platform and multi-language support. It also undertook several slowscan video links between the two countries, including supporting physicians such as UCLA's Bob Gale in treating patients exposed in the Chernobyl accident. It later founded a for profit phone and data provider SovAm (Soviet-American) Teleport in the later 80s. Meanwhile, on April 1, 1984 a Fool's Day hoax about "Kremlin computer" Kremvax was made in the English-speaking Usenet. There are reports of spontaneous Internet (UUCP and telnet) connections "from home" through X.25 in the USSR in as early as 1988. In 1990 a GlasNet non-profit initiative by the US-based Association for Progressive Communications sponsored Internet usage in several educational projects in the USSR (through Sovam).

=== Mass usage ===
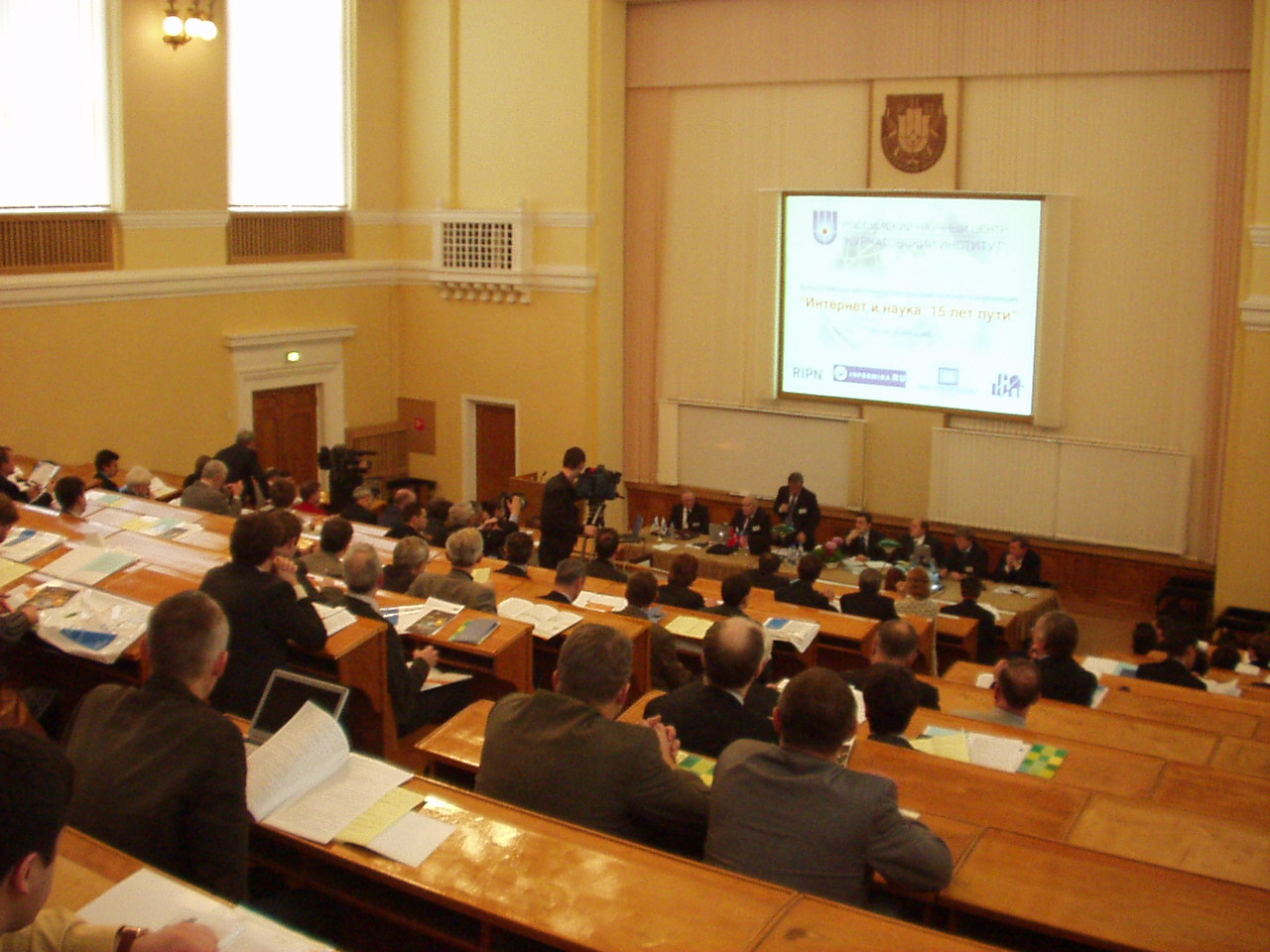
Conference "Internet and Science: 15 years of going" in the Kurchatov Institute on November 10, 2005

The development of Internet infrastructure in Russia began with development of analog modem-based computer networks in Soviet cities, primarily in scientific institutions. The first one to connect UNIX email hosts country-wide (including Soviet Republics) was the Relcom organization which formed on August 1, 1990 at the Kurchatov nuclear physics institute in Moscow. They were functioning together with partner programming cooperative Demos, named after the Soviet-made DEMOS Unix-like operating system. In August 1990 they established regular email routing with an Internet node in Helsinki University over a paid voice line. The construction of Academset was also going on at the time with VNIIPAS being its central node which was connected internationally over X.25 since the early 1980s. FidoNet connections reportedly started in 1990.

In 1990–1991 Relcom's network was rapidly expanding, it joined EUnet, registered .su domain, and was used to spread news about the Soviet coup attempt of 1991 worldwide while coupers through KGB were trying to suppress mass media activity on the subject. After the fall of the USSR many former Soviet state-controlled structures were inherited by the Russian Federation, vast telephone networks among them. With the transformation of the economy, market-based telecommunication industries grew quickly, various ISPs appeared.

Meanwhile, the first Russian FidoNet node reportedly started in October 1990 in Novosibirsk, and the USSR was included in FidoNet's Region 50. Russian FidoNet activity did contribute to the development of Runet, as mass-networking over BBSes was for a time more popular than over the Internet in the early 90s.

In March 1991, the National Science Foundation began to allow Eastern Bloc countries to connect to the global TCP/IP network (the "Internet proper").

By the mid-1990s, computer networks (where TCP/IP was replacing UUCP) appeared in many branches of regular life and commerce in Post-Soviet states. The Internet became a popular means of communication for anyone in the world who spoke Russian. National so-called Nets of former Soviet Republics began to occur (e.g. Uznet, Kaznet and others). Sovam Teleport provided SWIFT connections for banks in the early 90s.

In October 2007, then-Deputy Prime Minister Dmitry Medvedev announced that all of schools in Russia (about 59,000) were connected to the Internet, but later concerns were publicized that there were problems with a contractor to serve them. Also in December 2007, as a follow-up to the noted Ponosov's Case, which dealt with the use of illegal software in Russian schools, plans were announced to officially test Linux in the schools of Perm Krai, Tatarstan and Tomsk Oblast to determine the feasibility of further implementing Linux-based education in the country's other regions. In subsequent years test results were considered successful, but new organizational problems appeared, including obscurities with distribution of funds assigned by state. No mass usage of Linux in Russian schools followed, but later in 2nd half of 2010s state-related institutions and corporations began to massively implement Astra Linux instead of Microsoft Windows on the grounds that Windows is not secure and may be used in anti-Russia sanctions.

Since 2009, the website "Gosuslugi" ("state services") is developing that became an online standard for providing electronic state services for Russian citizens. A Russian Federation passport is required to register. Over 100 million users are registered in 2019 (~70% of Russian population).

According to statistics of the European Council, in the second half of 2012 the number of new subscribers connected by technology FTTx (fiber to building) in Russia increased by 2.2 million people, more than all 27 countries of the European Union combined. The total number of households with lets FTTx connection was 7.5 million. This means that in 2012 over 40% of the fixed line broadband users were connected by fiber optics.

Russia has achieved notable progress in achieving broadband connectivity for its citizens. Mobile broadband connectivity is close to average for advanced economies (60 active subscriptions for every 100 inhabitants), the rates of mobile phone penetration is one of the highest in the world, and Russia is a global leader in the affordability of fixed broadband, with subscriber costs meeting the affordability criteria of the UN International Telecommunication Union meeting more than 90 percent of Russian households. Russia's average Internet connection speed of 7.4 Mbit/s is also almost twice the global average of 3.8 Mbit/s.

However, Russia still faces challenges in the digital divide in reaching rural and remote areas. Fixed broadband penetration is highest in Moscow and lowest in the Chechen republic. Given Russia's enormous size and diverse levels of development, the digital divide continues to persist.

== Population ==
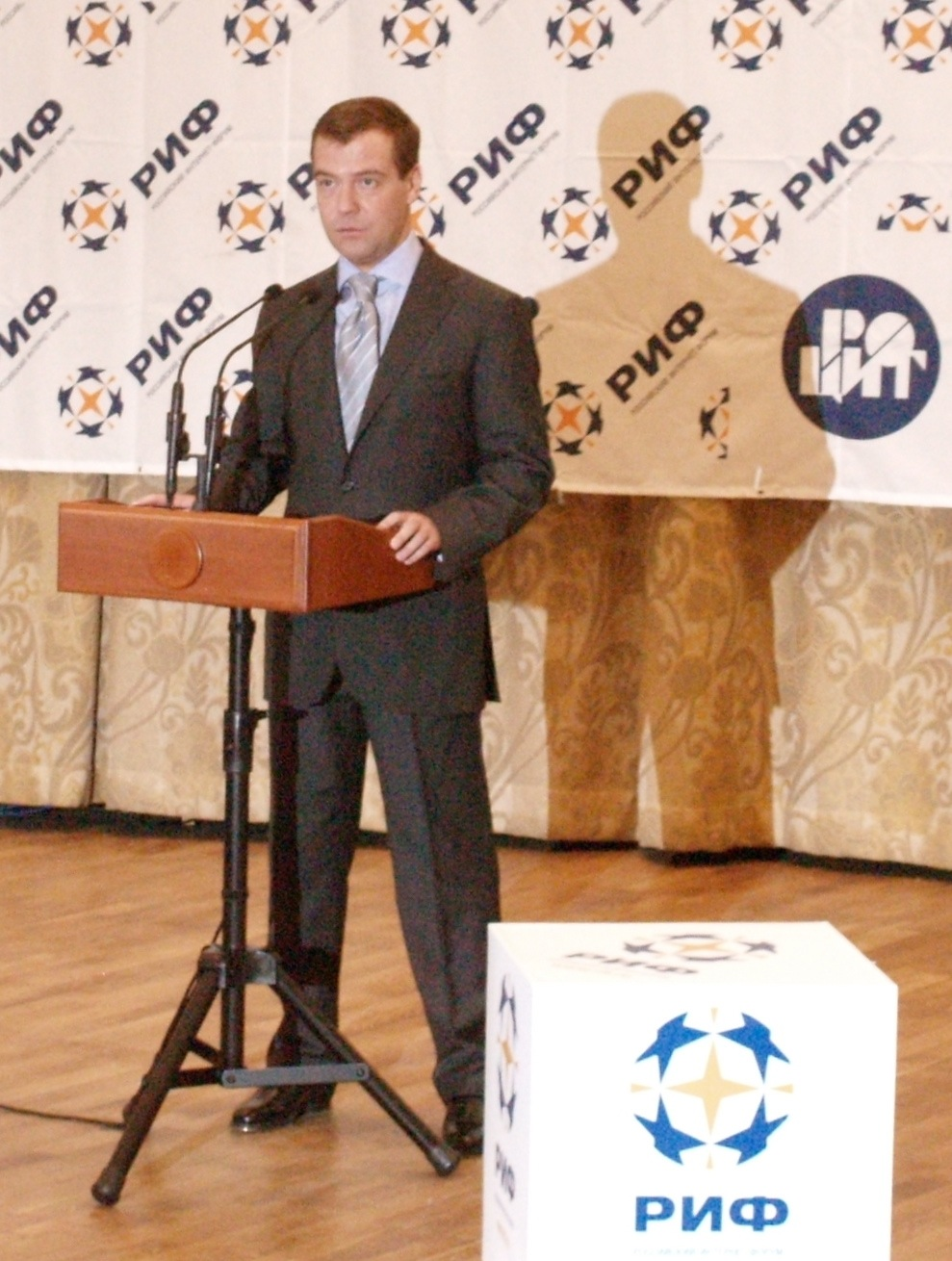
Dmitry Medvedev opening the RIF in 2008

The prominent Public Opinion Foundation FOM (ФОМ) in March 2007 issued a report that found 28 million people of 18 years and older in Russia (25%) had used the Internet within the last six months (monthly users 23.9/21%; daily 10.1/9%). In November 2006 TNS Gallup Media in a report called by some sources "first quality Internet audience research in Russia" put a monthly Russian audience at more than 15 million. The Rukv.ru monitoring project found 1,001,806 WWW-addresses within .ru and .su responding in March 2008. The national domain registration service RU-Center announced creation of millionth .ru domain on September 17, 2007 (about 200 thousand of domains are thought to be 'parked' by squatters).

On April 3, 2008, the RIF-2008 was opened by president-elect of Russia Dmitry Medvedev, who said in the opening address to the forum that he estimates Runet to be populated by 40 million users, or 28 percent of the population. He also stated that Russian sites do $3 billion in annual transactions and have $370 million in advertising revenue.

In October 2008 President Medvedev started his own video blog, which in April 2009 was expanded with the separately moderated version in LiveJournal.

In June 2009 FOM issued results of its new survey that found the "half-year audience" of people 18 years old and over was 33%, or 37.5 million.

CIA World Factbook states there were 10.382 million Internet hosts in 2008 and 40.853 million Internet users in 2010 in Russia.

By March 2011 the total number of broadband subscribers reached 16.5 million with penetration at almost 30%. These numbers increased within two years by 180% against 9 million in 2009. The highest penetration rate above 70% is in Moscow and Saint-Petersburg, these two cities also makes up a quarter of all subscribers (3.2 and 1.2 million respectively).

In September 2011, Russia overtook Germany as the European market with the highest number of unique visitors online.

According to Daily Telecom estimates, by the third quarter of 2013 there were 26.3 million broadband subscribers. Largest residential Internet service providers by market share at the end of 2013 were: Rostelecom: 38.6%, ER-Telecom: 11.1%, VimpelCom: 10.1%, MTS: 9.4%, TransTelekom: 4.6%, AKADO: 3.3%, Others: 22.9%

As of 2025, Russian language (spoken in numerous countries besides Russia) is the sixth most used for web content.

=== Debate in the West ===
Since 2013, the state has employed Internet users in order to spread propaganda and disinformation advocating activities of the Russian government and discrediting opposition and Western countries according to the US paper New York Times. The major organization employing them, "Internet Issledovania" (Russian: Интернет исследования), initially had an office in Saint Petersburg. They are involved in various activities including creating of visibility of mass-support of the government in social media (both in Russian and in English), propagating texts between different media, and collectively attacking users with anti-government views, often using multiple identities. Collectively, they are known as "Kremlin trolls" or "Trolls from Olgino". The same organization also hosts a number of websites, including the Kharkov News Agency, which claim to be news agencies operating from Eastern Ukraine or from the Donbas area and providing local news, but in fact have no staff outside the Saint Petersburg office building.

=== Government surveillance and censorship ===
According to Western media, the Russian government has access to the list of internet searches made by every citizen. In 2025, the Russian government forbade audio and video calls on messaging apps WhatsApp and Telegram. On 1 September 2025, it become a felony in Russia to access "manifestly extremist material" over the internet; the "extremist" label encompasses LGTBQ, Greenpeace, satanism and political movements such as Alexei Navalny's. From the same date it is also forbidden to advertise VPN services not approved by Roskomnadzor

== Backbone ==
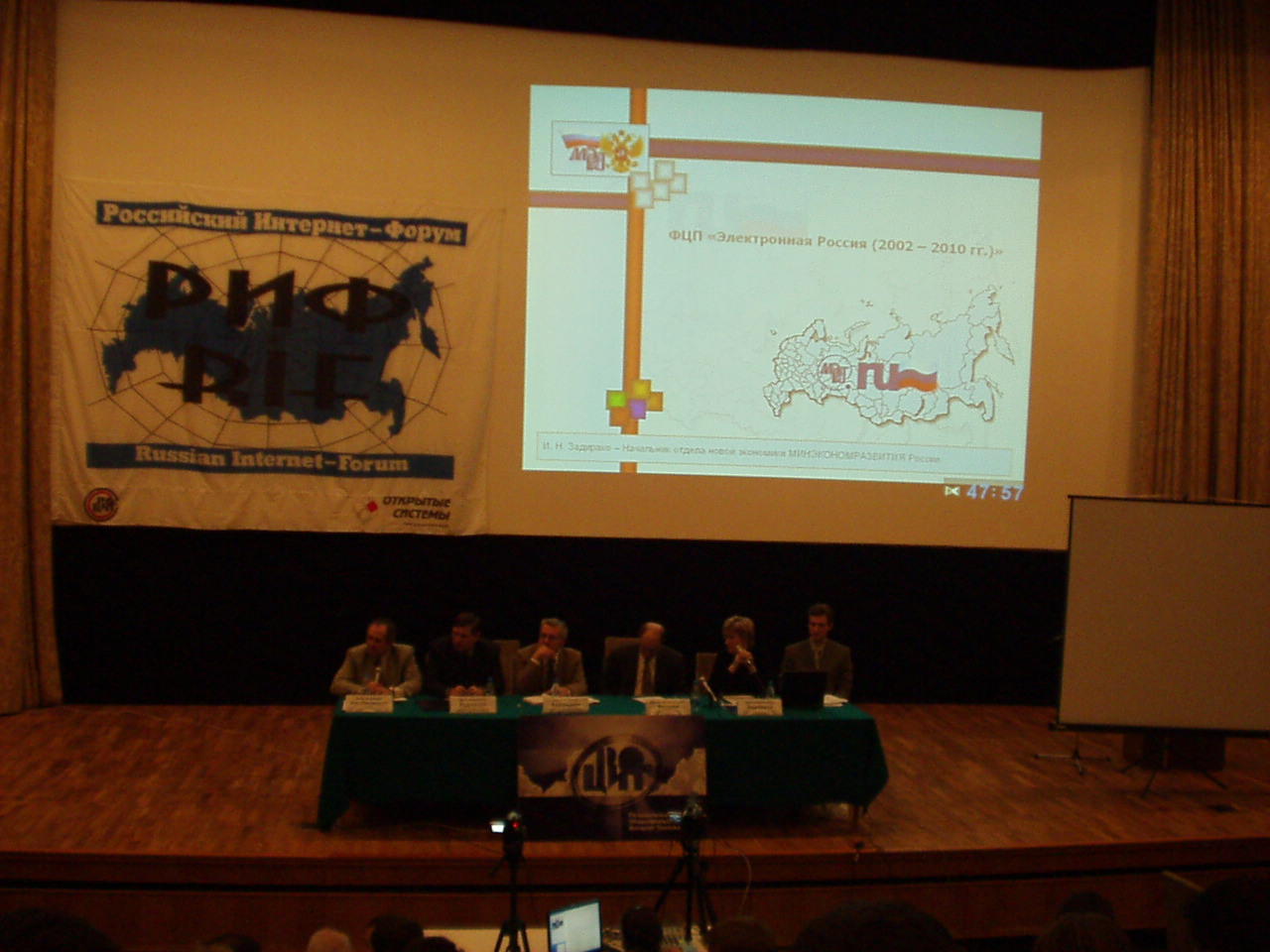
Government officials report to Russian Internet Forum on the "Electronic Russia" in 2005.

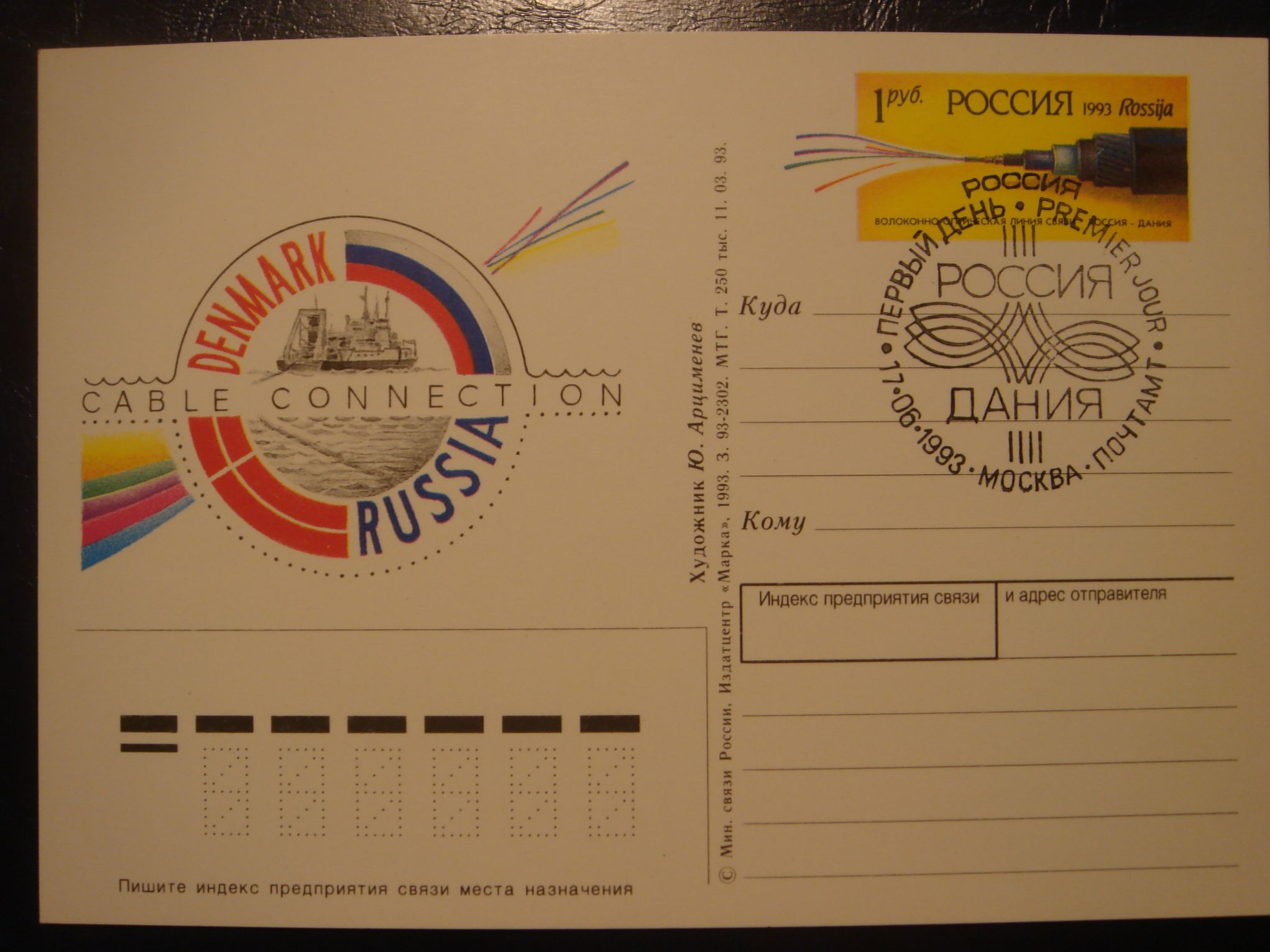
Postal envelope and stamp from 1993 commemorating Rostelecom's first underwater optic cable to Denmark

Back in the 1990s, Rostelecom was created on the post-Soviet telecom basis and later built international fiber optic cable systems — "Zapadny" (Denmark-Russia), "Yuzhny" (Italy-Turkey-Ukraine-Russia) and "Vostochny" (Russia-Japan-Korea) — as well as "Moscow-Khabarovsk" Trans-Russian Fiber Optic Line. The situation favored Russia's entry to the international telecommunication transit market. However, low transmission capacity (560 megabits per second) of all the three systems designed mainly for voice communication became the principal obstacle that hindered international expansion.

In 2005 the Chelyabinsk-Khabarovsk Fiber-Optic Communication Line was laid-down which extends for 10 thousand kilometers. The minimum transmission rate was 120 Gigabits per second.

Plenty of local commercial ISPs function in large cities, but most of the existing country-wide cable lines are held by small number of large operators such as former "monopolist", the state-controlled Rostelecom and the railways-affiliated Transtelecom, which operates country's biggest DWDM fiber backbone. Cell phone coverage with the digital services such as GPRS is almost ubiquitous. In year 2007 the Golden Telecom company has constructed a massive Wi-Fi network in Moscow for commercial use which is recognized as the largest urban wireless network in the world. The Black Sea coast of Russia has become an important area for the fiber-optic networks, as it served as a backbone of communication during the Winter Olympic Games in 2014.

In October 2010, mobile operator MegaFon has selected Huawei NE5000E routers to construct backbone nodes for a 40-Gbit/s IP/MPLS network in Russia' s largest cities, including Moscow and St. Petersburg, Huawei says. Meanwhile, Megafon also announced the opening of what it touts as Russia's largest data center in Samara.

In 2011 Rostelecom started implementation of WDM-based equipment on the backbone network for data transmission in the Republic of Dagestan. Due to WDM introduction the fiber-optic communication lines bandwidth increased to 2.5 Gbit/s. Rostelecom invested about 48 million rubles in the project.

Until 2011 the backbone network in Russia was based on DWDM technology with a capacity of 10 and 40 Gbit/s. The operator started projects to expand the capacity of the Transit Europe – Asia transit line at two independent branches. Communication lines are under construction within a second phase of the TEA backbone "High Speed Backbone Transit Europe-Asia". The construction of the first branch completed in 2011 (Khabarovsk – Stockholm). The second branch (Khabarovsk – Frankfurt) was completed in 2013. In addition, the expanded backbones are in the route of Khabarovsk – Nakhodka – Tokyo and Khabarovsk – Hong Kong, where equipment of 100G WDM is also applied.

Presently, MasterTel, based in Moscow and Saint Petersburg, is an ISP that provides high speed fiber-optic lines of up to 10 Gbit/s per second to consumers and businesses.

In 2012, the Russian Federation announced an ambitious target of providing 90% of households with "ultrafast" connection speeds of at least 100 megabits per second by 2018.

== See also ==
- Telecommunications in Russia
- Internet Exchange Points in Russia
- Internet censorship in Russia
- List of sovereign states in Europe by number of Internet users
- Russian Wikipedia
- List of Russian IT developers
- Academset
