= History of the Internet in Russia =

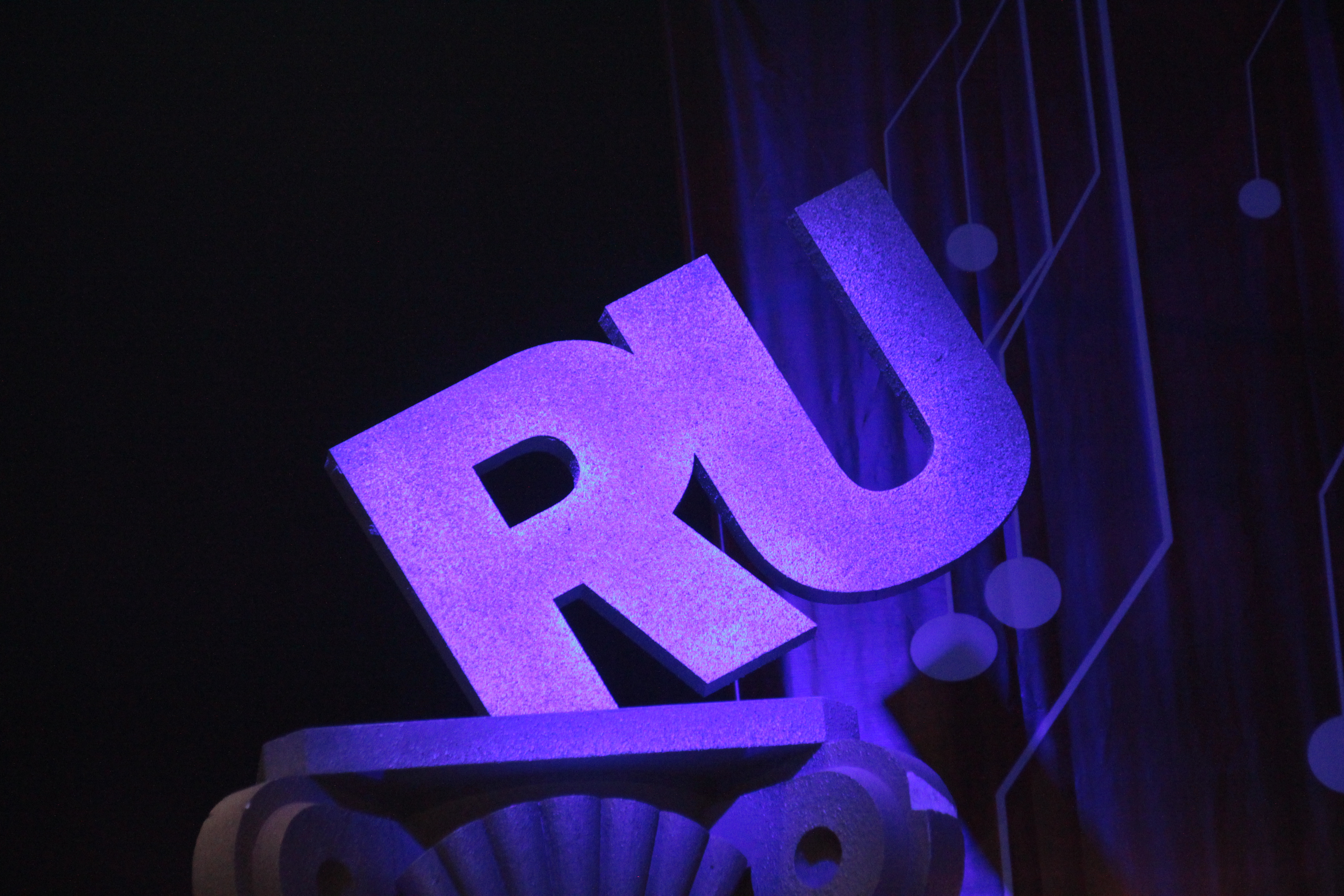
Runet logo at the 2009 Runet Prize ceremony

The Russian internet (also known as the runet) is a part of the Internet with its main content in Russian. According to data from August 2019 and studies conducted by W3Techs, 6.5% of the 10 million most popular Internet sites in the world use Russian. In 2013, according to these studies, the Russian language became the second most used on the Internet after English. Since the advent of the internet, once experienced a period of relatively greater internet freedom, however, the country has progressively tightened its control over international connectivity, emphasizing its autonomy, security and gradually developing an independent website ecosystem.

== Background ==
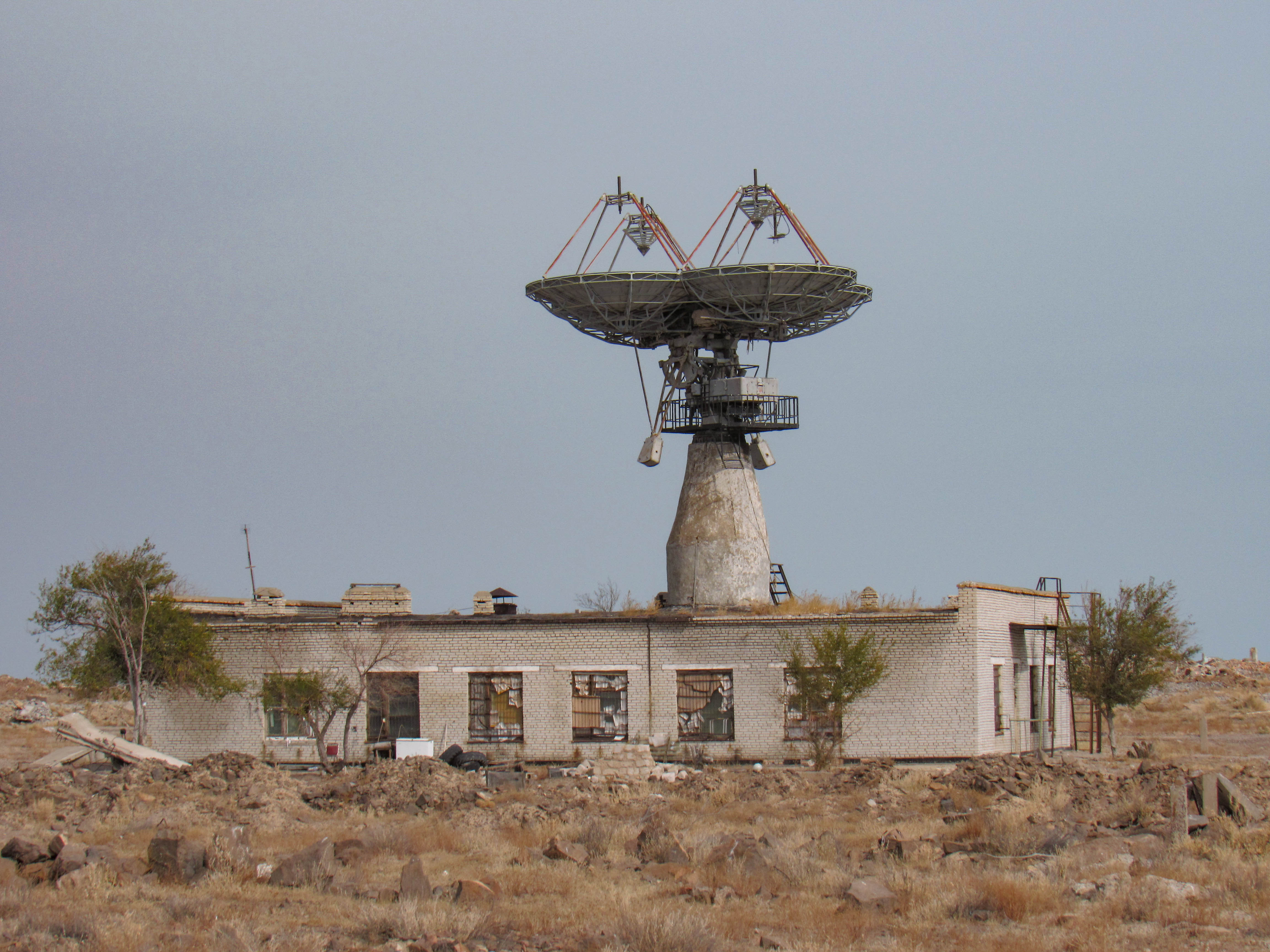
Sary Shagan ground facilities (2023 shot)

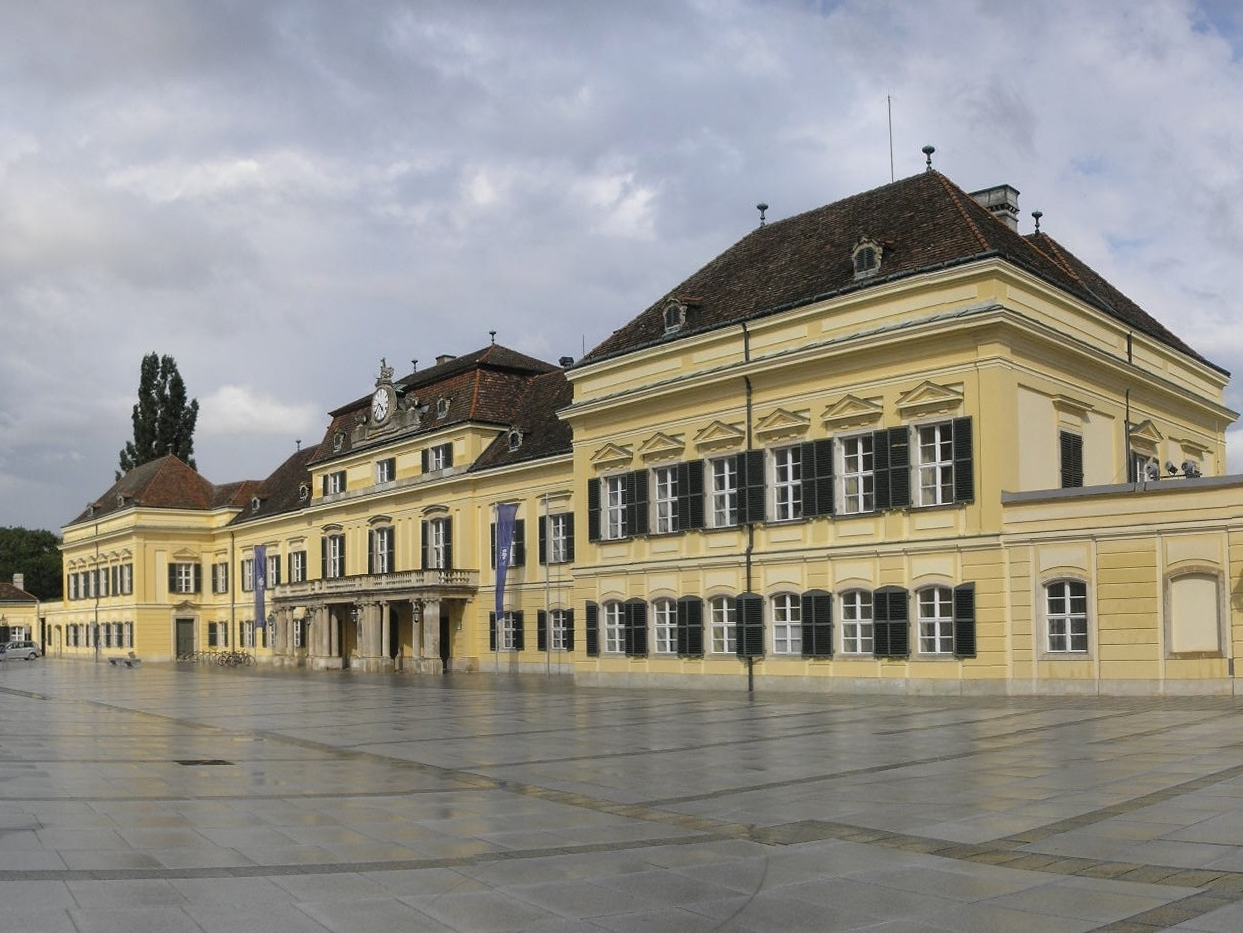
IIASA's headquarters in Laxenburg, Austria — the first fixed foreign X.25 node of Soviet Internet since 1978

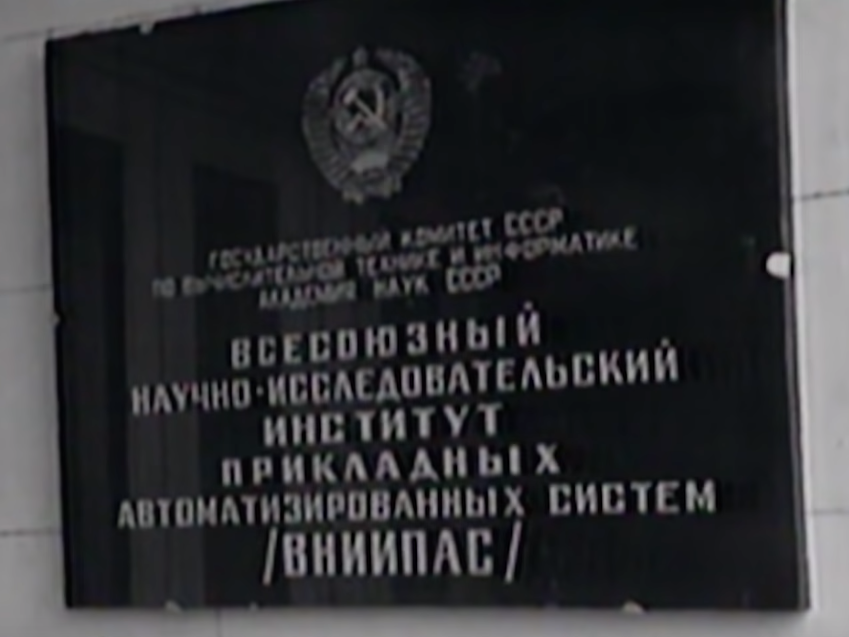
The entrance signboard at VNIIPAS (Gosteleradio screenshot, 1988)

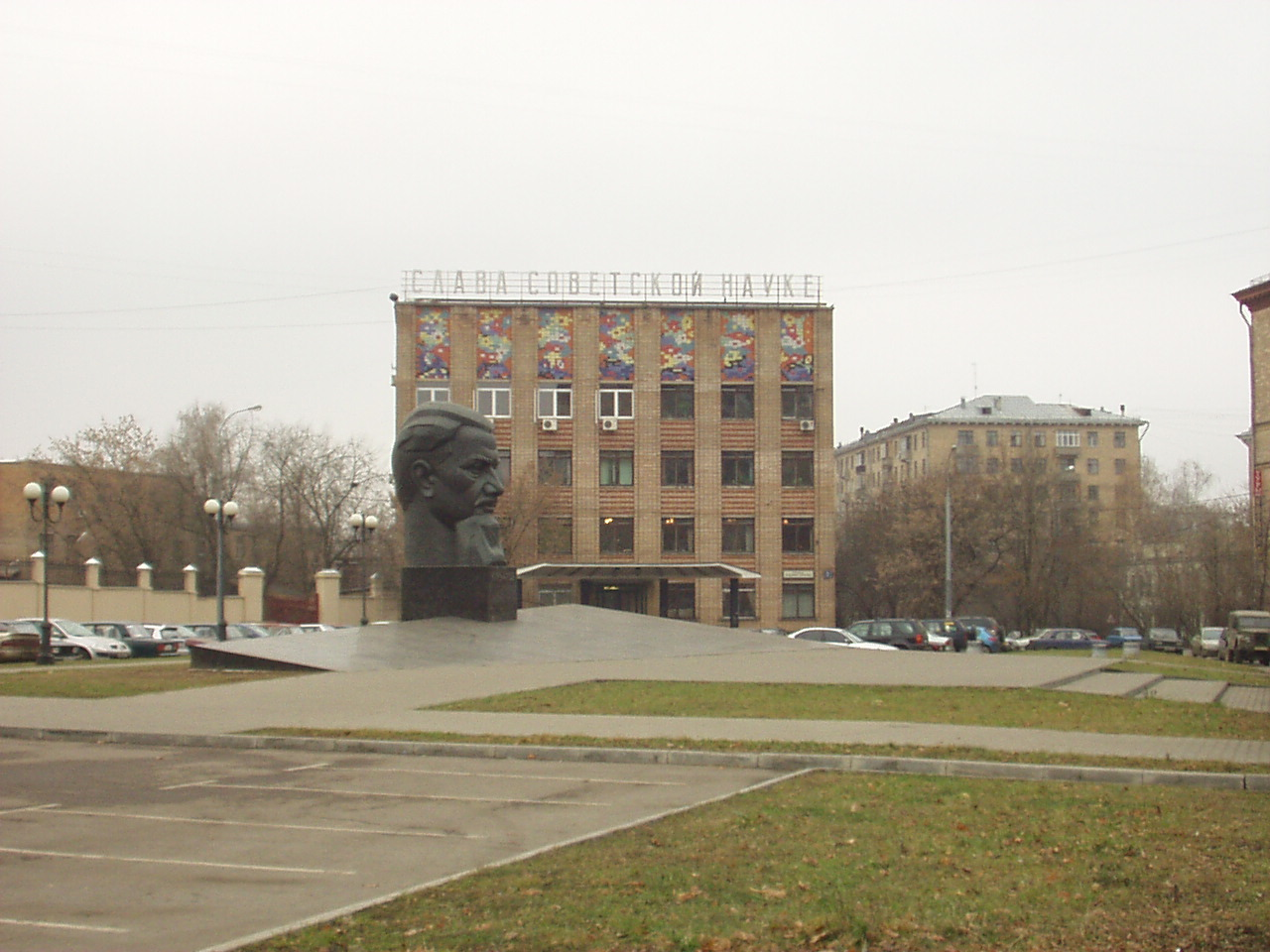
Kurchatov Institute, the base for first public Soviet computer network, the RELCOM, creator of .su top level domain (1990)

In the USSR, the first computer networks appeared in the 1950s in missile defense system at Sary Shagan (first they were tested in Moscow at Lebedev Institute of Precision Mechanics and Computer Engineering). 1957 Sputnik crisis contributed to development of computer networks both in USSR and USA. The Sputnik-1 online trajectory digital data was collected at 70 tracking stations, transmitted binarily via telegraph and then calculated at the Computing Centre of the Academy of Sciences. In the 1960s, the massive computer network project called OGAS was proposed but failed to be implemented, though stimulating development of pack of structures such as Gosplan Computing Centre established in 1959. In 1965 Kotok-McCarthy/ITEP USSR-USA computer chess game digital data was transmitted internationally via telegraph. Apollo–Soyuz USA–USSR joint space program (1972–1975) used digital data for spaceships monitoring and control and they were transmitted between participating countries via satellite links that were connected to ground networks consisting of nodes such as Star City, Russia and Houston space center. The Apollo–Soyuz 1975 flight paths were monitored and digitally processed by Soviet missile defense military programmers.

Since 1972, Sirena and Express computer networks began nationwide operations connecting thousands of airline and railroad cash offices all over the country provided with keyboards, displays and printers for tickets. Later on, since the late 1970s, x.25 Soviet networks began to appear and Akademset emerged in Leningrad in 1978. By 1982 VNIIPAS institute was created in Moscow to serve as Akademset's central node. The connection was established in 1978 over X.25 permanent digital ground copper cable connection to IIASA in Laxenburg, Austria providing 9600 baud link which was divided by 4800 baud between USSR and middle-lying ČSSR (that allowed access to other worldwide networks). In 1983, VNIIPAS, together with the US government, Joel Schatz, Don Carlson, Michael Kleeman, and Chet Watson, created a Soviet X.25 service provider called SFMT ("San Francisco — Moscow Teleport") that later became Sovam Teleport ("Soviet-American Teleport"). VNIIPAS also provided X.25 services, including over satellite, to Eastern bloc countries together with Mongolia, Cuba and Vietnam.

At the time, Western users of Usenet were generally unaware of that, and considered such networking in USSR nonexistent, so one of them on April 1, 1984, made an April fools' hoax about "Kremvax" ("Kremlin VAX") that gained some popularity for subsequent years. In 1988, John Draper after a visit in the USSR wrote an Usenet summarizing message saying that he discovered developed digital culture within Soviet users of computers. The first recorded Usenet message from USSR dates 26.12.1989. Later the USSR nominally joined the private Fidonet network in October 1990 when the first node of Region 50 appeared in Novosibirsk. Some of the early Soviet/Russian networks were also initiated as parts of BITNET.

== Foundation of the Russian Internet ==
=== Sovam Teleport ===
Sovam Teleport is a Russian telecommunications company that was founded in 1990. The company was established as a joint venture of the San Francisco Moscow Teleport (SFMT) network and the All-Russian Research Institute of Automated Application Systems (ВНИИПАС). The name stands for "SOViet-AMerican Teleport".

San Francisco Moscow Teleport (SFMT) was launched in 1983 by and Joel Schatz with the support of the US government. Californian modem node of SFMT was permanently connected to VNIIPAS/IIASA trans-country copper digital line existing since 1978 and established by future VNIIPAS director Oleg Smirnov. It was a non-profit project with a goal to expand the Internet to the USSR. In 1986, the project changed its status and became a commercial enterprise, with financing from George Soros added in 1988. The All-Russian Research Institute of Automated Application Systems provided a data transmission network with some countries in Eastern Europe, as well as Cuba, Mongolia, and Vietnam, almost all of the data traffic was scientific and technical information, and in 1983 organized a non-state email network. By the beginning of the 1990s, almost half of the VNII traffic amounted to operational data from electronic mail systems.

The New York Times newspaper on February 19, 1989 on its first page published article "New Satellite Channel Opens Computer Link to the Soviets" by John Markoff that highlighted VNIIPAS/IIASA/Sovam network development with adding of Tymnet and Sprint satellite nodes at Central Telegraph.

The company's first network was built on the X.25 protocol in 1990. In 1992, Sovam Teleport began to build a UUCP mail and terminal access system through American servers. Johnson & Johnson, Coca-Cola, DuPont, Estee Lauder, Time magazine, and France Presse were among the first corporate clients of the company. Since 1992, the British company Cable & Wireless, which has its own fiber-optic channels in Europe, has become the third co-founder of the company. On June 4, 1992, the company was re-registered as a limited liability partnership, and all three co-founders - Cable & Wireless, All-Russian Research Institute of Automated Application Systems and SFMT - received almost equal shares. On July 28, 1993, a communications center in Tashkent began servicing customers. The provider domain sovam.com, which opened on February 24, 1994, became the first public Internet site in Russia.

Sovam Teleport in early 1990s became a first SWIFT network provider for emerging Russian banks (over x.25). In 1995 Sovam Teleport launched Russia Online (ROL) public dial-up ISP.

=== DEMOS-based network ===
After invading Afghanistan, the Soviet Union found itself under sanctions (already being limited by CoCom). However, a group of developers made a Russian version of the Unix operating system, secretly brought from America, and called it DEMOS. Some Unix developers, working at the Kurchatov Nuclear Energy Research Institute created a network that used DEMOS, namely RELCOM. The main feature of this network was that it was a fully horizontal network, i.e. each networked computer could directly communicate with other computers on the network. Many labs took part in joint experiments, so rapid communication was very much needed. Therefore, the first network users were mainly Soviet research institutes, so they could exchange scientific information more rapidly.

=== Cityline ===
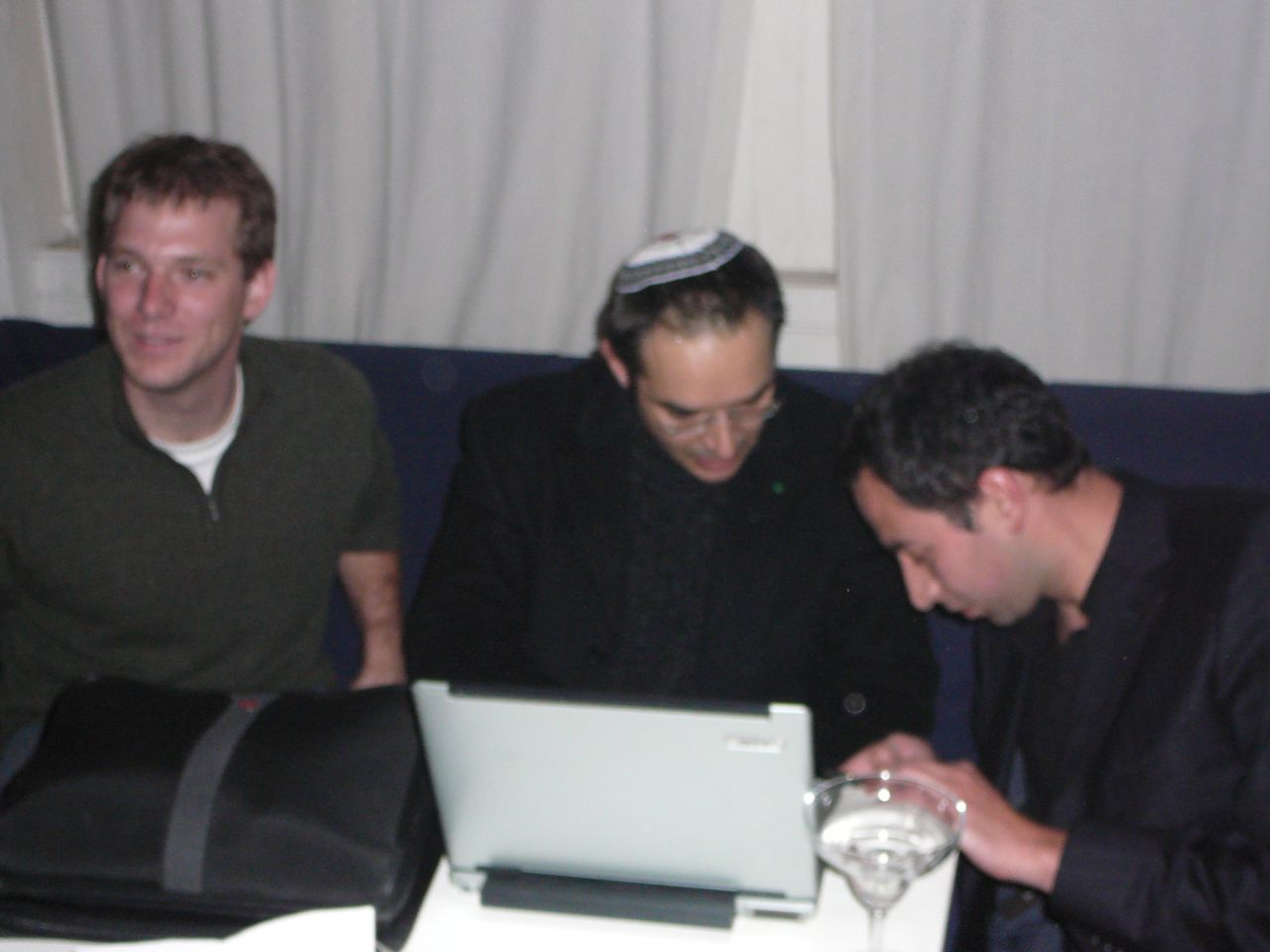
Brad Fitzpatrick (Livejournal), Anton Nossik, and Edward Shenderovich

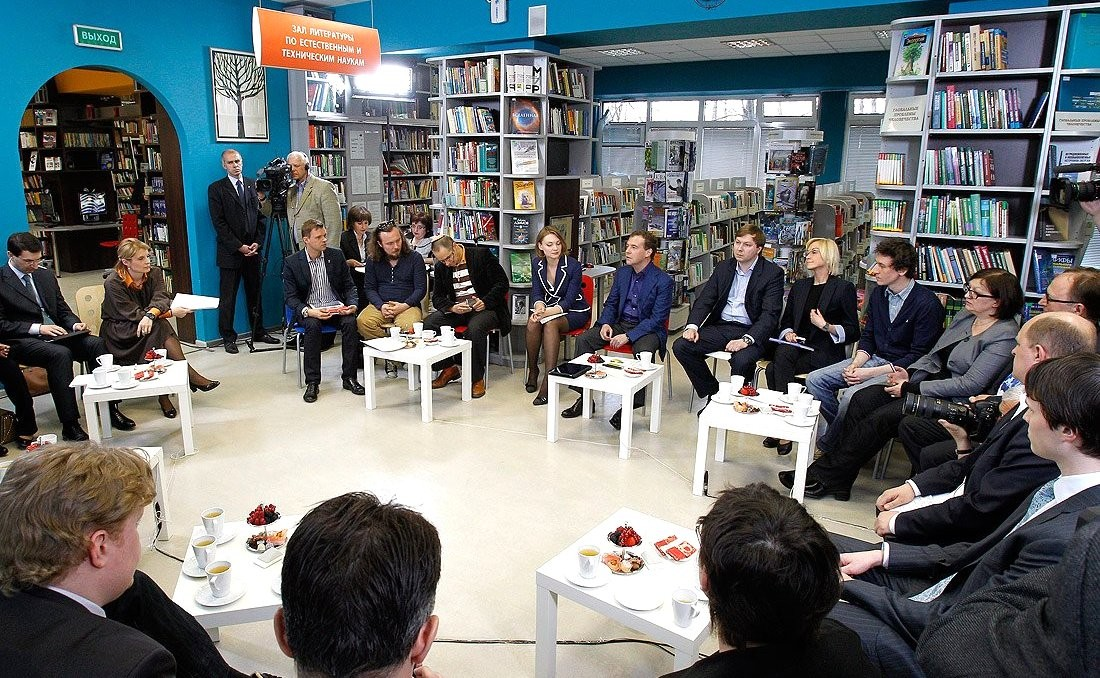
In 2011 Russian President Dmitry Medvedev met with representatives of the Russian internet community, including Anton Nossik, Galina Timchenko and Ivan Zassoursky.

Cityline was one of the first internet providers in Russia that aimed to counter ROL's monopoly at public dial-up market. It was founded in 1996 by Emelyan Zakharov, Demian Kudryavtsev, Egor Shuppe, Dmitriy Bosov and Rafael Filinov. The realization of the fact that the Internet was not appealing for Russian users without content led to content-oriented services. Cityline approached Anton Nosik, a journalist, and Anton would later create content for them. It led to a portal named 'Vechernii Internet' (Вечерний Интернет), where Anton Nosik published his articles. In addition, the very first Russian web designer was Artemy Lebedev, who designed websites for Cityline. One of the most popular websites on the Russian internet was Anekdot.ru, a website dedicated to humour and stories. Anekdot.ru was founded by astrophysicist Dmitrii Verner.

== Search engines ==
=== Rambler ===
In 1996, the first Russian search engine, Rambler was launched. It was created by Sergey Lysakov, Dmitry Kryukov and others, who worked as scientists in Pushchino research facility. The algorithm that served as a basis for Rambler initially was used for registering and searching for microorganisms. One of the key features was the so-called Rambler Top-100, that showed the one hundred top searched websites on the Russian internet. In the beginning of 1999, 53% of Rambler's shares were sold to investors Russian Fonds (Русские Фонды) and Orion Capital Advisors. As a result, the founders of the company became less important in the company. In 2000, as a result of the conflict between investors and the founders, Sergey Lysakov and Dmitry Kryukov left the company. Rambler later became a media company that included its own TV channel, the Rambler TV. Anton Nossik, for a short term, served as vice president of Rambler, also being a chief editor of Rambler's Lenta.ru, one of the most visited European news websites at the time (5th place in 2013).

=== Yandex ===
September 23, 1997 — the Yandex search engine appeared, which performs a Russian search based on morphological analysis. With support by 1989-founded Comptek computer trader, the project has been formed since the early 1990s by scientists from Moscow research institutes who were engaged in machine analysis of texts (in particular, based on the work of academician Yuri Apresyan). One of their first big projects was a machine search of the Bible, as it is not protected by copyright. Ilya Segalovich and Arkadii Volozh developed a search algorithm that was based on the morphology of Russian language. Initially this algorithm was proposed to Rambler for approximately 15K dollars, but was rejected. After the rejection, Ilya and Arkady decided to found their own company, Yandex. Key figures in the company: Ilya Segalovich, Arkady Volozh and Elena Kolmanovskaya, editor-in-chief until 2012. Initially, it was a small company - employees at Yandex were friends of Arkadii Volash. Gradually Yandex became one of the leading Russian internet companies, and today, it includes several sub-companies, including Yandex.Taxi and news aggregator Yandex.News.

== Social Networks ==
=== Mail.ru ===
Alexei Krivenkov created Russia's first e-mail service, while working for an American IT company. Mail.ru, that is based on a free web mail system created by Alexei Krivenkov, became the main asset of Port.ru, a company he co-founded with his American partner, Eugene Goland. Mail.ru was able to become the top three most visited Russian websites. In 1999, they attracted the first investment in the history of the Russian Internet - one million dollars. One of the top Russian businessman, Yuri Milner - billionaire, global investor, one of co-owners and chairman of Mail.ru Group during the period from 2001 to 2012. He pursued the degree in physics from Moscow State University. After the collapse of the Soviet Union, he later studied to become an investment banker. In 1999, Yuri Milner was looking for a project in which to invest his first capital. After studying several industries, he came across a young and growing sector called Internet, that required minimal startup capital and had an enormous potential. Milner raised some investment money and started a company called Netbridge. Among its first acquisitions were entertainment website Fomenko.ru and Herman Klimenko's web directory List.ru. Later Netbridge merged with Port.ru and was renamed after its main asset - Mail.ru. The merger was, in fact, an acquisition - nobody from the old Port.ru team remained in the company. One of the new directions that appeared after merger was online gaming. Dmitry Grishin, the main integration ideologist, became Mail.ru's technical director at the age of 22, later company's CEO. He realized that people in that time in Russia weren't ready to pay for games. Therefore, he decided to make games free. People would play, have fun, and then service offered players to buy something that will make them feel better. Mail.ru Group is a Russian technology company. They own many companies, including VKontakte, Odnoklassniki.ru, YouDrive, Delivery Club, etc. In May 2017, Forbes put the Mail.ru Group in 97th place out of 100 most innovative companies in the world. In February 2017, Forbes estimated that the company's value was about 4 billion dollars. The company calls its communication development strategy "Communitainment" (communication + entertainment) and focuses on the development of communication and entertainment Internet services.

=== VKontakte ===
VK (VKontakte) is a social network, that was founded in 2006 by Pavel Durov with the help of Russian-Israeli investors Yitzchak Mirilashvili and Lev Leviev. Nikolai Durov, the elder brother of Pavel Durov and a winner of multiple awards in mathematics and coding, was the lead software engineer of VKontakte. In 2010 the main office of VK was placed in the Singer building in Saint-Petersburg. Soon after its launch, VK gained massive attention among Russian-speaking users. It was free, in contrast to odnoklasniki.ru. In addition to being a social network, it also functioned as a file sharing network: users had a possibility to upload films, music, pictures, etc. In 2014 Pavel Durov resigned and left Russia. On 16 September 2014, Mail.ru Group became the sole owner of VK.

=== Odnoklasniki.ru ===
Odnoklasniki.ru is a social network that was launched in 2006 and created by Albert Popkov. The concept was similar to the social network Classmates.com, a website that was used for classmates to chat. As a result of losing users to VK, Odnoklasniki.ru focused on a more mature and more provincial audience. In 2008, Popkov's former British employer sued him, claiming that he'd stolen the code for Odnoklassniki.ru. Eventually, Popkov won the trial, however he lost his position as CEO. After that, access to Odnoklasniki.ru became fee-based, which cost Odnoklasniki.ru some users. Ilya Shirokov, the new CEO of Odnoklasniki.ru, rebranded the network, and it became the second most popular social network in Russia. In order to stay relevant, the company added a streaming service that enabled users to stream their own life moments to their friends.

== Messengers ==
Popular ICQ messenger was in 2010 sold by AOL to Russia-based Mail.ru. In 2024 Mail.ru terminated it, it was functional until then.

=== Telegram ===
After leaving VKontakte, Pavel Durov founded Telegram, a cross-platform messaging service. It includes general chats, secret chats, group chats, channels and chat-bots. The service is cloud-based, which means that all chats can be available on all devices, except for secret chats.

The main emphasis was put on anonymity and encryption. Secret chats use end-to-end encryption, where only the sender and receiver have an encryption key. In contrary to general chats, messages are not decrypted on the server and message history is stored on the client devices. It is also possible to set a timer for secret chat, where all messages and files in the chat will be permanently deleted after a certain amount of time.

In 2018, Roskomnadzor required Pavel Durov to give access to the encryption keys, otherwise Telegram would be blocked in Russia. As a response, Pavel Durov stated that it is not possible to transfer encryption keys, as they were being created on a user's device every time that user connects with someone. On April 13, 2018, the Tagansky court of Moscow ruled in favor of Roskomnadzor, allowing them to block Telegram in Russia. As a response to the block, Pavel Durov created Digital Resistance. On April 30, 2018, more than 12 thousand people gathered on Moscow streets to support Telegram. Those events increased interest in Telegram among Russian users.

== Russian bloggers ==
=== LiveJournal ===
With the emergence of Facebook, LiveJournal's popularity in the United States began to wane. In Russia, it continued to grow. LiveJournal became a platform for the formation of civil society.

The first to unite were car drivers campaigning against the excessive use of flashing lights on the roads. The community received the name of "Blue Buckets".

Civil activists on LiveJournal were soon followed by politicians. Aleksei Navalny's corruption investigations made his blog the most popular one on LiveJournal. The politician is still referred to as a blogger in pro-government media. According to Aleksei Navalny, "After 2005 or 2006, when mass media had been cleaned up and there remained only a couple of independent newspapers, the entire political debate moved to LiveJournal."

In 2007, LiveJournal was acquired by SUP Media, co-owned by a Russian businessman named Aleksandr Mamut.

=== Bloggers in politics ===
The first Russian politician to start a channel on YouTube was Aleksei Navalny, an opposition figure. In the summer of 2019, Moscow saw protests: first, against not allowing independent candidates to run in local elections, and then against police excesses against protesters. Russian YouTubers have been described as one of the driving forces of the Moscow protests. Danila Poperechny, Eldar Dzharakhov and Restaurateur came to St. Petersburg to take part in the rallies. Nikolai Sobolev, a vlogger, covered the protests and the criminal cases against demonstrators.

== Governmental control ==
=== Safe Internet League ===
Konstantin Malofeyev, founder of the "Safe Internet League", initiated the first restrictive Internet law in Russia. The so-called filtration law makes it mandatory to block websites containing harmful information, like pedophilia, propaganda of suicide, etc. As Malofeyev stated, the League's main task was to prepare a bill to protect children from negative content. The bill was supported by Yelena Mizulina, a Russian politician. Russian internet leaders, including Yandex, LiveJournal and VKontakte, spoke out against the Internet filtration law, seeing it as a censorship tool. The Russian Wikipedia went on a one-day strike. After that, the Russian State Duma has since passed more than 20 laws restricting the Internet.

=== Yarovaya law ===
Two bills declared by their authors as having an anti-terrorism focus were adopted in Russia in July 2016. As far as internet restriction is concerned, the law has two aspects:

Internet traffic storage. The bill obliges telecom operators to store calls and messages of subscribers for a period determined by the Government of the Russian Federation (but no more than 6 months).

Encryption tools. The bill establishes a ban on the use of non-certified means of encoding (encryption). For violation of this prohibition, the violator faces a fine of 3,000 to 5,000 rubles with confiscation of encryption. Also, the law obliges the organizers of the dissemination of information on the Internet to decode user messages. At the request of the FSB, companies will need to provide keys to encrypted traffic.

=== Sovereign Internet Act ===
The official law implies creation of independent network infrastructure, in order to maintain Internet connection in the case of foreign root servers becoming unavailable. According to an official statement, the Sovereign Internet Act will increase internet security in case of a cyber attack. Sovereign Internet Act is intended to create a possibility to isolate the Russian segment of the Internet, in addition it could be possible to switch off the Internet connection to certain areas of Russia. Among the public, the Sovereign Internet Act was considered to be an instrument of censorship and control over the Internet. On March 10, 2019, approximately 15 thousand people gathered on Sakharov Avenue to support free internet. The law was enacted on November 1, 2019.

== See also ==
- Internet in Russia
- History of the Internet
