= St. Petersburg Institute for Informatics and Automation of the Russian Academy of Sciences =

Soviet-Russian research institute

- Russian: Санкт-Петербургский институт информатики и автоматизации Российской академии наук (СПИИРАН)
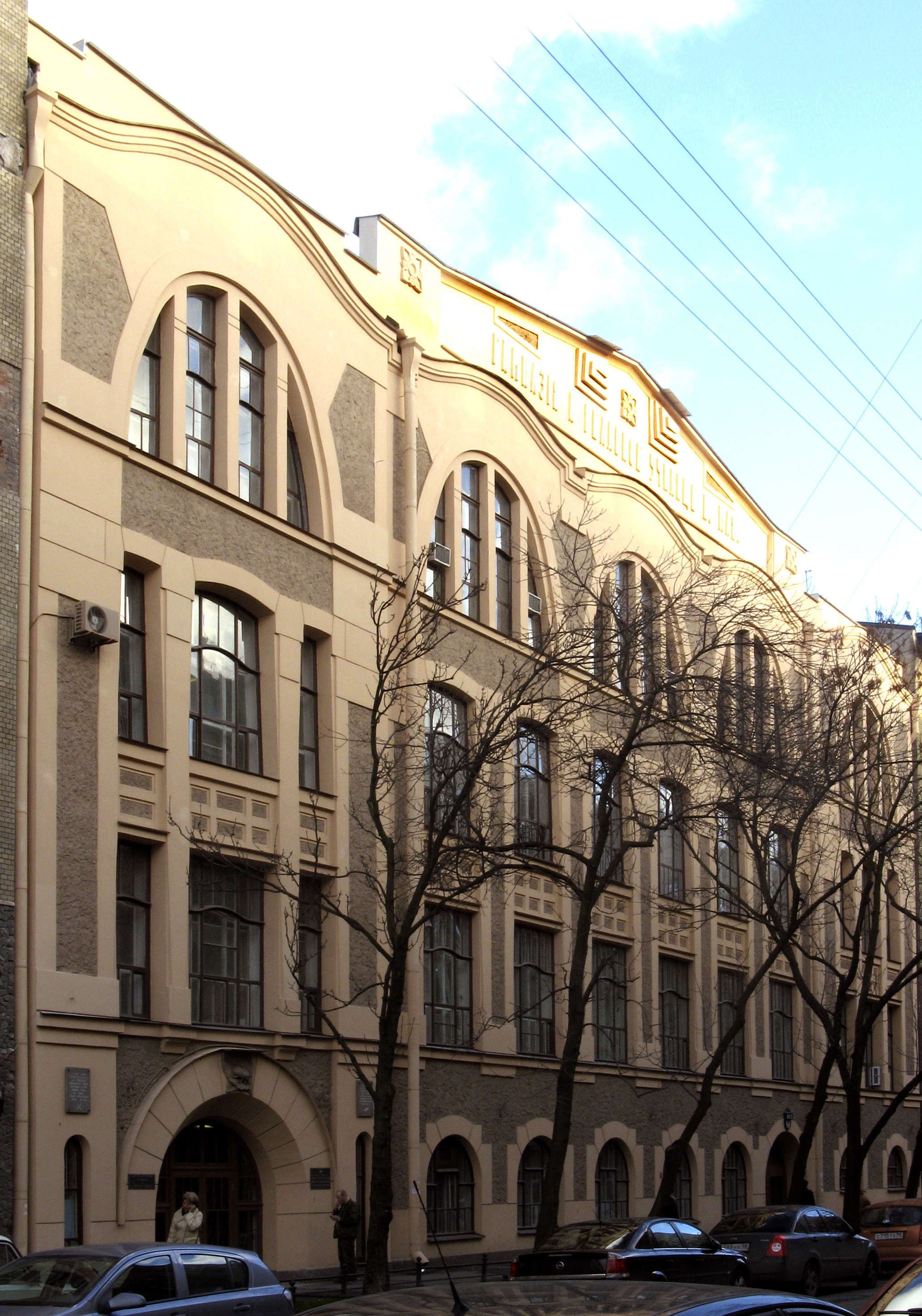
- Established: 19 January 1978
- Research type: basic, applied
- Field of research: computer science, intelligent automation systems, information technologies
- Directors: 1978-1991 Ponomarev Valentin Mikhailovich 1992-now Yusupov Rafael Midhatovich
- Location: 14th Line, 39, Saint Petersburg, 199178, Russia; 59.939871°N 30.269317°E
- Operating agency: Federal Agency for Scientific Organizations of the Russian Federation (FANO)
- Website: http://www.spiiras.nw.ru/en/

The St. Petersburg Institute for Informatics and Automation of the Russian Academy of Sciences (SPIIRAS) (Russian: Санкт-Петербургский институт информатики и автоматизации Российской академии наук) is a federal state budgetary institution of science located in St. Petersburg, Russia. It was founded on 19 December 1977 by a Decree of the Council of Ministers of the USSR. The official foundation date is 19 January 1978, according to a Decree of the Presidium of the USSR Academy of Sciences. The main research fields of the institute are computer science, intelligent automation systems and information technologies. The Institute is located in the building of the former gymnasium of K. May. The current director of the institute is Rafael Midhatovich Yusupov.

== History ==
SPIIRAS was founded on the basis of the computer technology department of the Ioffe Physico-Technical Institute of the USSR Academy of Sciences at 19 December 1977 by the Decree of the Council of Ministers of the USSR and at 19 January 1978 by the Decree of the Presidium of the USSR Academy of Sciences. The first name of the institution was Leningrad Research Computing Center of the USSR Academy of Sciences (LRCC). The founder and the first director of the Institute was Doctor of Technical Sciences, Professor Ponomarev Valentin Mikhailovich.

The LRCC took an active part in the creation of a North-West segment of the computer network of the Academies of Sciences of the USSR and the allied republics (Academic Network) for the collective use by scientists of academic organizations. Under the leadership of Ponomarev V.M In the first stage of the regional computer subnetwork North-West of Academset was developed and created in 1980.

The Academset was a Soviet analogue for the Internet and had a connection with it. In 1982 in Moscow a dedicated institution was created, called VNIIPAS. It was planned as central node of Academset at international level, but this was never implemented, while the main technical functions for Academset construction were carried by LRCC/SPIIRAS.

In 1985, LRCC was transformed into the Leningrad Institute of Informatics and Automation of the USSR Academy of Sciences (LIIAN). LIIAN also took part in the information content creation of the academic network. For the geoinformation specialists, in 1987 a center located in LIIAN was created for receiving, processing, storing and delivering information through information channels from the international meteorological satellites NOAA-9 (10, 11, 12) to the users of the academic network.

The Institute has been renamed to St. Petersburg Institute for Informatics and Automation of the Russian Academy of Sciences (SPIIRAS) in 1992, after the Leningrad was renamed back to the St. Petersburg. In the same year, Ponomarev V.M. was relieved of his post of director due to the termination of his term of office and Yusupov R.M. was appointed as the new director of SPIIRAS.

== Publications ==
SPIIRAS issues a scientific journal "SPIIRAS Proceedings" that accepts paper from the fields of computer science, automation and applied mathematics. The journal is issued in printed and online versions with frequency of 6 times in a year. The journal is indexed in Russian (RSCI) and world (Ulrich's Periodicals Directory, Scopus (since 12 June 2016)) bibliographic databases. Since 2014 all articles have DOI identifiers and included in CrossRef. The accepted languages of papers are Russian and English.

== See also ==
- Karl May School
- Russian Academy of Sciences
