= Anatole Klyosov =

Russian scientist (born 1946)

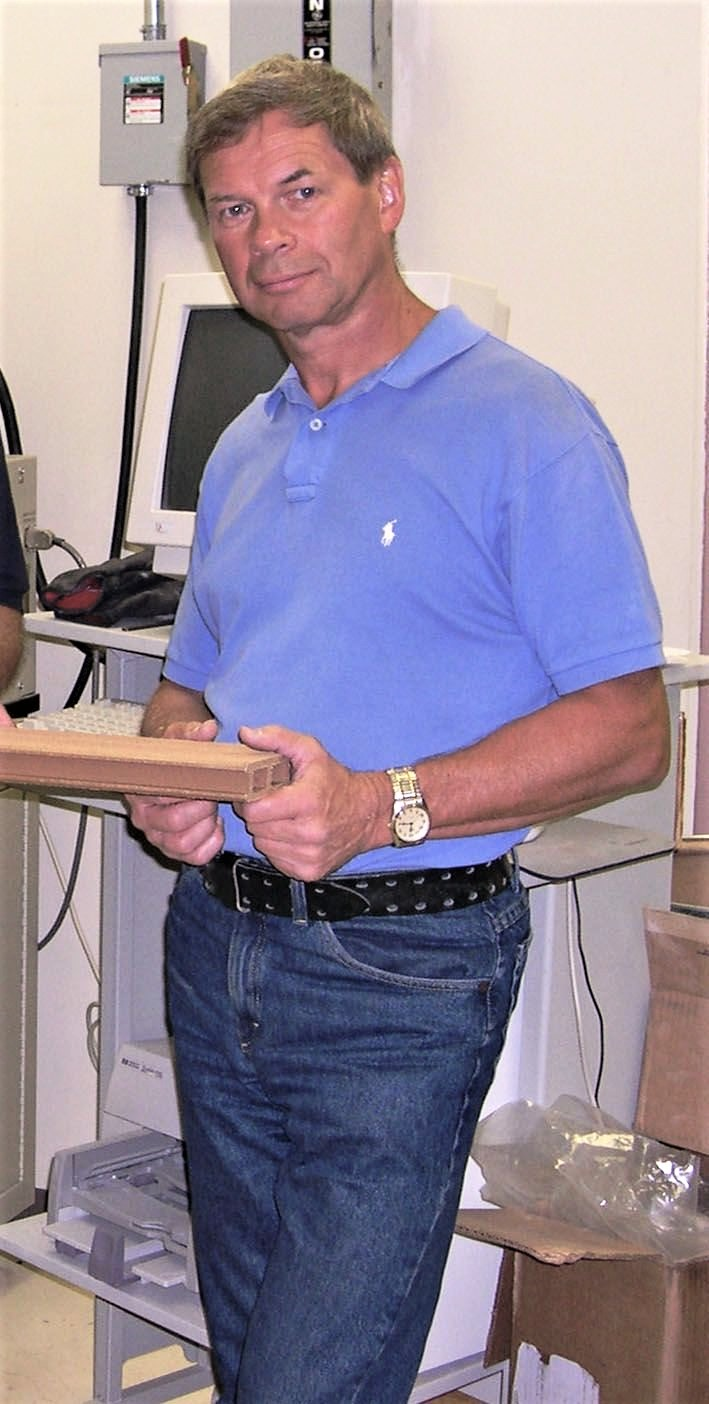
2008 photo

Anatole A. Klyosov (Russian: Анато́лий Алексе́евич Клёсов; born 20 November 1946 in Chernyakhovsk) is a Russian-American scientist who worked in the fields of physical chemistry, chemical kinetics, enzyme catalysis, industrial biochemistry, chemical engineering, cancer research, and DNA genealogy. In 1989 Klyosov immigrated to the US. In the USSR he was working on kinetics and mechanisms of enzyme catalysis, for which he was awarded the top national prize for young scientists (1978), and on biotechnology of converting agricultural waste products into useful products, for which he was awarded the top national prize in science and technology (1984). Later in the US he was working on cancer research at Harvard Medical School, then, in the industry, on turning paper mill waste into composite deck boards, and yet later in biomedical research. He helped found a company, and later joined it as CSO, that was founded to use carbohydrates (galactose derivatives in particular) to reduce side effects of chemotherapy.

== Early life and education ==
Klyosov earned a Ph.D. and D.Sc. in physical chemistry, along with an M.S. in enzyme kinetics, from Moscow State University. During his studies, he focused on enzyme kinetics and catalysis, developing methods that would later influence industrial applications. In 1974-1975, he worked at Harvard University; however, the USSR government did not permit him to accept a contract to continue there, compelling him to remain in the USSR. From 1979 to 1981, he served as a professor in the Department of Chemical Enzymology at Moscow State University.

== Career ==
=== Research in the USSR ===
From 1981 to 1990, Klyosov was a professor and head of the Carbohydrates Research Laboratory at the A.N. Bach Institute of Biochemistry, USSR Academy of Sciences. In the winter of 1982/1983 he became the first person behind the Iron Curtain who was allowed by the government of the USSR to use the computer network that later (1990) became the Internet, in order for him to represent the USSR in the First Global Computer Conference (set up by the United Nations Industrial Development Organization, UNIDO) hosted on the network; he used an x.25-connected computer at a Moscow institute called VNIIPAS. During this period, he developed methods to use enzymes to convert cotton plant waste products into glucose, and by 1983, a pilot plant had been established in the USSR to test these methods. For that he was awarded the Gold Medal for Industrial Achievements in the USSR (1984). He was awarded top Russian prizes in science and technology field: the Lenin Komsomol Prize in 1978 and the USSR State Prize in 1984. In 1989 he was made a fellow of the World Academy of Art and Science. In 2014 he became Foreign Member of the National Academy of Sciences of Georgia.

=== Move to the United States ===
Klyosov immigrated to the US in 1989 after Mikhail Gorbachev came to power, and from 1990 to 1998 he was a visiting professor of biochemistry at the Center for Biochemical and Biophysical Sciences at Harvard Medical School.

=== Entrepreneurship ===
In 1991 he started a consulting business called MIR International.

From 1996 to 2006 Klyosov worked at a subsidiary of Kadant, where he applied enzymology to processing of waste products from the paper-making industry, and following advice from a friend in the plastics industry, helped create a business that used cellulose granules as filler material for plastic composite products.

In 2001 he helped found Pro-Pharmaceuticals, writing its Business Plan, a company that was formed to add certain carbohydrates (galactose derivatives in particular) to existing cancer drugs to make them work better, and reducing their side effects in particular. He joined the company as Chief Scientific Officer in 2006. Pro-Pharmaceuticals named a new CEO in March 2011, and gave Klyosov a one-year contract to continue as CSO the same month. Klyosov resigned as CSO in 2013, when the company moved to Atlanta, GA. The company was renamed as Galectin Therapeutics in May 2011. He then became a member of the company's scientific advisory board with the title Founder Emeritus. In the field of cancer research Klyosov published four books, by John Wiley & Sons and the American Chemical Society.

=== DNA genealogy ===
Since 2008, Klyosov has been known for his work in "DNA genealogy," a field he describes as synthesizing biology, anthropology, archaeology, and linguistics, and applying methods of chemical kinetics to genetics. He developed methods for analyzing Y-chromosome and mitochondrial DNA variations to trace ancestry, population migration, and historical relationships. He published ten books between 2010 and 2016 in this field. Some authors have proposed alternative accounts to the "Out of Africa" model. Klyosov has advanced an "Into Africa" hypothesis that attributes certain lineage origins outside Africa; however, large-scale genetic studies continue to support a recent African origin for anatomically modern humans. Reports of R1b lineages in parts of Africa have been documented and should be described with appropriate sourcing.

A 2015 open letter from scientists in various fields said that his writing could fuel hatred “attracting readers whose nationalist and political ambitions are not satisfied with the world’s scientific body of knowledge.” "DNA genealogy" has been described in the letter as pseudoscience and "DNA demagoguery”. Klyosov responded in his book “Who Does Not Like DNA Genealogy” (2015) pointed that it was personal vendetta by a few Russian scientists who could not stand criticism by Klyosov of their low level “science”, and that most of those who signed that open letter had no knowledge in DNA Genealogy.

Klyosov is the founder and president of the Academy of DNA Genealogy and self-publishes its proceedings via Lulu. In 2013, he became editor-in-chief of the journal Advances in Anthropology, published by Scientific Research Publishing. His paper in that journal (together with I.L. Rozhanskii) on re-examining the “Out of Africa” theory collected 167,442 views and 40,400 downloads (September, 2025).

== Awards and honors ==
Klyosov was awarded top Russian prizes in science and technology field: the Lenin Komsomol Prize in 1978 and the USSR State Prize in 1984. In 1989 he was made a fellow of the World Academy of Art and Science. In 2014 he became Foreign Member of the National Academy of Sciences of Georgia.

== Publications ==
=== Books in English ===
- Klyosov, A. A. (2007). Wood-Plastic Composites. John Wiley & Sons. ISBN 9780470165928. (Translated to Chinese, Science Press, China, 2010; translated to Russian, НОТ Publishing House, 2010, 736 с.)
- Wingard, L. B. Jr; Berezin, I. V.; Klyosov, A. A., eds. (1980). Enzyme Engineering. N.Y.: Plenum Press.
- Klyosov, A. A.; Witczak, Z. J.; Platt, D., eds. (2006). Carbohydrate Drug Design. ACS symposium series (Vol 932). Washington DC: American Chemical Society. ISBN 9780841239463.
- Klyosov, A. A.; Witczak, Z. J.; Platt, D., eds. (2008). Galectins. John Wiley & Sons. ISBN 9780470377789.
- Klyosov, A. A., ed. (2012). Glycobiology and Drug Design. ACS symposium series (Vol 1102). Washington DC: American Chemical Society.
- Klyosov, A. A.; Traber, P. G., eds. (2013). Galectins and Disease Implications for Targeted Therapeutics. ACS symposium series (Vol 1115). Washington DC: American Chemical Society. ISBN 9780841228801.
- Anatole A. Klyosov, DNA Genealogy, 1998, by Scientific Research Publishing, book online

=== Books in Russian ===
==== Enzymology ====
- Berezin, I. V.; Klyosov, A. A. (1976). Практический курс химической и ферментативной кинетики [Practical Course of Chemical and Enzymatic Kinetics] (in Russian). Moscow University Press.
- Klyosov, A. A.; Berezin, I. V. (1980). Ферментативный катализ. Т. 1 [Enzyme Catalysis, Vol. 1] (in Russian). Moscow University Press.
- Klyosov, A. A. (1984). Ферментативный катализ. Т. 2 [Enzyme Catalysis, Vol. 2] (in Russian). Moscow University Press.
- Berezin, I. V.; Klyosov, A. A.; et al. (1987). Egorov, N. S.; Samuilov, V. D. (eds.). Биотехнология. Кн. 8: Инженерная энзимология [Biotechnology. Book 8: Engineering Enzymology] (in Russian). Москва: Высшая школа.

=== Publications on "DNA genealogy" ===
- Klyosov, A. A.; Tyunyayev, A. A. (2010). Происхождение человека (по данным археологии, антропологии и ДНК-генеалогии) [Origin of Man (according to archaeology, anthropology and DNA genealogy)] (in Russian). Москва: Белые Альвы. ISBN 978-5-91464-040-5.
- Кљосов, A. A. (2013). Порекло Словена. Осврти на ДНК-генеалогију [Origin of Slavs. Essays in DNA Genealogy] (in Serbian). Београд: Мирослав.
- Klyosov, A. A. (2015). Происхождение славян и других народов. Очерки ДНК-генеалогии [Origin of Slavs and Other Peoples. Essays in DNA Genealogy] (in Russian). Москва: Алгоритм. ISBN 978-5-4438-0978-6.
- Klyosov, A. A. (2013). Происхождение славян. ДНК-генеалогия против "норманнской теории" [Origin of Slavs. DNA Genealogy Against the "Norman Theory"] (in Russian). Москва: Алгоритм. ISBN 978-5-4438-0324-1.
- Klyosov, A. A. (2013). Занимательная ДНК-генеалогия [Entertaining DNA Genealogy] (in Russian). Москва: Вече. ISBN 978-5-4444-1351-7.
- Klyosov, Saidov, A. A. (2016). Евреи и пуштуны Афганистана [Jews and Pashtuns of Afghanistan] (in Russian). Москва: Концептуал. ISBN 978-5-9067-5658-9.
- Klyosov, A. A. (2016). Кому мешает ДНК-генеалогия? Ложь, инсинуации, и русофобия в современной российской науке [Who is Against DNA Genealogy? Lies, Insinuations and Russophobia in modern Russian science] (in Russian). Москва: Книжный мир. ISBN 978-5-8041-0842-8.
- Klyosov, A. A. (2016). Ваша ДНК-генеалогия [Your DNA Genealogy] (in Russian). Москва: Концептуал. ISBN 978-5-9067-5698-5.
- Klyosov, A. A. (2016). ДНК-генеалогия от А до Т [DNA Genealogy from A to T] (in Russian). Москва: Книжный мир. ISBN 978-5-8041-0873-2.
