= Kadant =

US-based paper company

Kadant Inc.
- Company type: Public
- Traded as: NYSE: KAI; Russell 2000 Component; S&P 600 component
- Industry: Diversified machinery
- Founded: 1991
- Headquarters: Westford, Massachusetts, United States
- Key people: Jeffrey L. Powell ( CEO, President and Director) Eric T. Langevin ( COO) Jonathan W. Painter ( Executive Chairman)
- Products: Stock preparation systems, fluid handling systems, roll doctoring, cleaning and filtration, fiber-based granules
- Number of employees: 2,800
- Website: www.kadant.com

Kadant Inc. is a company that was established in 1991, as a partly privately owned subsidiary of Thermo Electron, and partly publicly traded company, and was fully spun out and renamed Kadant in 2001. The company supports papermaking, paper recycling, wood processing, material handling, and other processing industries. Kadant is a multi-national corporation with operations in Asia, Europe, North America, and South America.

== History ==
The company was established as Thermo Fibrotek in 1991 as a wholly owned subsidiary of Thermo Electron as part of its parent's strategy to innovate and grow by creating subsidiaries that were privately owned in part, and publicly traded in part. Its initial focus was paper making and paper recycling equipment.

In 1996, the company set up a subsidiary, Thermo Fibergen, which it in turn made partially publicly traded, to focus on technologies to recover products from paper-making waste products; that company in turn acquired Granulation Technology, Inc. and created a division called GranTek that produced granules from sludge that were used, for example, as a carrier for agricultural chemicals and pesticides. The original plan was that Fibergen would build its plants adjacent to paper-making plants to process their waste, but this plan failed because it required paper-making plants to commit to long-term contracts to dispose of their waste, which they were unwilling to do. The granule business became the focus of Fibergen, helped in part by enzymologist Anatole Klyosov.

In 1997, the company acquired Black Clawson for $110 million.

In 2001, Thermo Electron fully spun out Thermo Fibrotek, which changed its name to Kadant at the same time; the Fibrogen division was renamed to Kadant Composites at the same time. The granule business of Kadant Composites took off when the company started using it as a filler in composite plastics products for decking, with sales growing from under $2 million in 2001 to $15 million in 2004.

In 2013, the company acquired Carmanah Design and Manufacturing Inc. for Canadian dollars (CAD) 54 million in cash, or approximately US$52 million.

== Products ==
Kadant engages in mainly four segments: stock preparation systems; fluid handling systems; roll doctoring, cleaning and filtration; and fiber-based granules. Kadant provides custom-engineered systems (e.g. recycling and approach flow systems) and equipment (e.g. virgin pulping process equipment). The company also provides fluid-handling systems (e.g. rotary joints, syphons, turbulator bars, precision unions) widely used in the dryer section of the papermaking process, and the production of corrugated boxboard, metals, plastics, rubber, textiles, chemicals, and food. In addition, the company offers doctoring systems (e.g. doctor blades), profiling systems, shower and fabric-conditioning, formation, and water filtration systems. Kadant also provides individual components, widely used in pulping, de-inking, screening, cleaning, refining recycled. The company supplies biodegradable absorbent granules from papermaking byproducts for some agriculture uses.

== Research and development ==
Kadant's Research and Development facilities are based in Europe and the US, engaging in fiber processing, heat transfer, doctoring, and fluid handling. These facilities are located where customers can test under their own operating conditions. The company also holds seminars and training programs.
