= OGAS =

Soviet internet-like project, automation of economy

OGAS (Russian: Общегосударственная автоматизированная система учёта и обработки информации, "ОГАС", "National Automated System for Computation and Information Processing") was a Soviet project to create a nationwide information network. The project began in 1962 but was denied necessary funding in 1970. It was one of a series of socialist attempts to create a nationwide cybernetic network.

The US government in 1962 regarded the project as a major threat due to the "tremendous increments in economic productivity" which could disrupt the world market. Arthur Schlesinger Jr, historian and special assistant to US President John F Kennedy, described "an all out Soviet commitment to cybernetics" as providing the Soviet Union a "tremendous advantage" in respect to production technology, complex of industries, feedback control and self-teaching computers.

== Concept ==
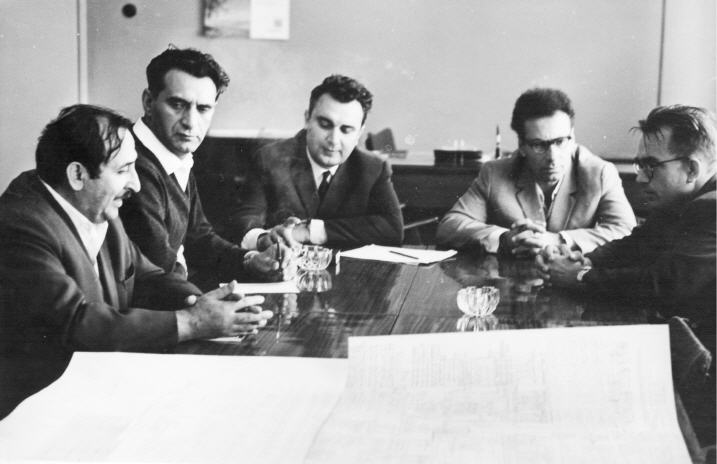
Glushkov (seated first on the right) at the Computing Center of the Armenian Academy of Sciences

The primary architect of OGAS was Viktor Glushkov. A previous proposal for a national computer network to improve central planning, Anatoly Kitov's Economic Automated Management System had been rejected in 1959 because of concerns in the military that they would be required to share information with civilian planners.

Glushkov proposed OGAS in 1962 as a three-tier network with a computer centre in Moscow, up to 200 midlevel centres in other major cities, and up to 20,000 local terminals in economically significant locations, communicating in real time using the existing telephone infrastructure. The structure would also permit any terminal to communicate with any other. Glushkov further proposed using the system to move the Soviet Union towards a moneyless economy, using the system for electronic payments.

In 1962, Glushkov estimated that had the paper-driven methods of economic planning continued unchanged in the Soviet Union, then the planning bureaucracy would have grown by almost fortyfold by 1980.

He urged the full implementation of the OGAS project to Politburo members in 1970 with the view:

"If we do not do [the full OGAS] now, then in the second half of the 1970s the Soviet economy will encounter such difficulties that we will have to return to this question regardless."

Glushkov sought financial funding with an estimated amount of "no less than 100 billion rubles" or equivalent to $850 billion in 2016 U.S. dollars but believed the saving returns would be fivefold on the first fifteen-year investment.

The project failed because Glushkov's request for funding on 1 October 1970 was denied. The 24th Communist Party Congress in 1971 was to have authorised implementation of the plan, but ultimately endorsed only expansion of local information management systems. Glushkov subsequently pursued another network plan, EGSVT, which was also underfunded and not carried out.

The OGAS proposal was resented by some liberals as excessive central control, but failed primarily because of bureaucratic infighting. It was under the auspices of the Central Statistical Administration, and fell afoul of Vasily Garbuzov, who saw a threat to his Ministry of Finance. When EGSVTs (Note: "ЕГСВЦ", from "Единая государственная сеть вычислительных центров" (lit. "Unified State Network of Computing Centres")) failed, the next attempt, SOFE, (Note: "СОФЭ", from "системы оптимального функционирования социалистической экономики" (lit. "Systems for the Optimal Functioning of the Socialist Economy")) was done in 1964 by Nikolay Fedorenko, who attempted to build an information network that could be used in economic planning in Soviet Union's planned economy. The project was successful at a micro-level but did not spread into wide use.

== Cybernetic economic planning ==
Beginning in the early 1960s, the Communist Party of the Soviet Union considered moving away from the existing Stalinist command planning in favor of developing an interlinked computerized system of resource allocation based on the principles of cybernetics. This development was seen as the basis for moving toward optimal planning that could form the basis of a more highly developed form of socialist economy based on informational decentralization and innovation. This was seen as a logical progression given that the material balances system was geared toward rapid industrialization, which the Soviet Union had already achieved in the preceding decades. But by the early 1970s the idea of transcending the status quo was abandoned by the Soviet leadership, who felt the system threatened Party control of the economy. By the early 1970s official interest in this system ended.

By the end of 1970s the "natural" development of Soviet computers led to creation of the project called Akademset aimed at construction of nationwide optic fiber and radio/satellite digital network but only the Leningrad part of it was actually implemented before dissolution of the USSR. By 1992 Soviet computers serving it were destroyed and in 1990 USSR/Russia obtained a state-independent global Internet connection via telephone to Finland due to efforts of a private telecom enterprise called Relcom.

== 2016 book ==
In 2016, a book dedicated to OGAS was published in the US, entitled How Not to Network a Nation: The Uneasy History of the Soviet Internet, by Benjamin Peters, professor at University of Tulsa. Harvard University professor Jonathan Zittrain commented that the book "fills an important gap in the Internet's history, highlighting the ways in which generativity and openness have been essential to networked innovation". A reviewer of the book at MIT wrote: "Soviet attempts to build a national computer network were undone by socialists who seemed to behave like capitalists".

== See also ==
- Akademset
- ARPANET
- Cybernetics—in the Service of Communism
- Cybernetics in the Soviet Union
- Era of Stagnation
- Economic planning
- History of the Internet
- History of the Internet in Russia
- Planned economy
- Project Cybersyn
- Scientific socialism
- The Lucas Plan
