= Ponosov's case =

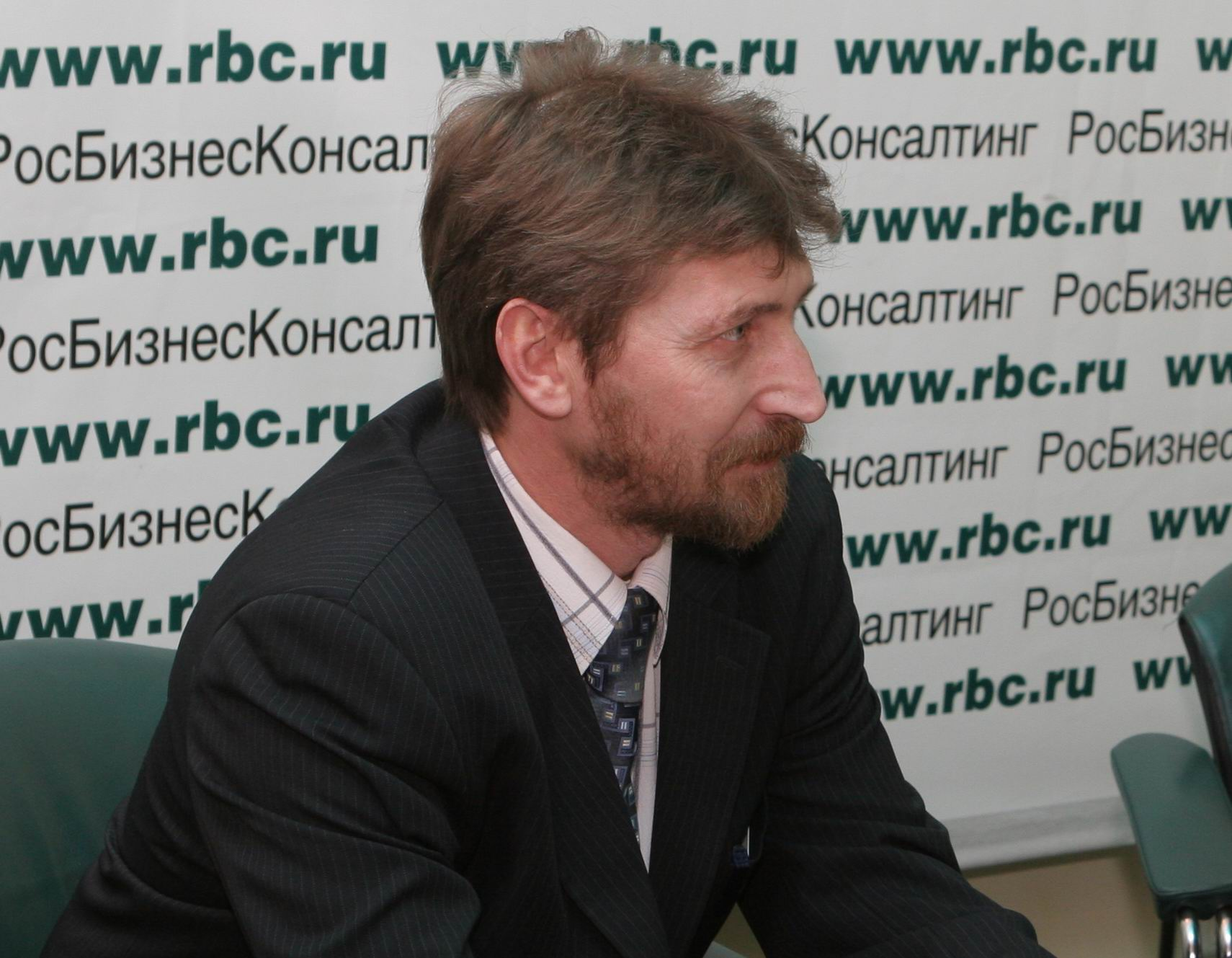
Aleksandr Ponosov

Ponosov's case is an action against Aleksandr Ponosov, a teacher and principal of a high school in Sepych village of Perm Krai of Russia. Aleksandr Ponosov was charged with illegal use of unlicensed copies of Microsoft Windows and Microsoft Office on 12 computers being used in the school (article 146.3 of the Russian Criminal Code) and of damnification of 266,593.63 rubles (about 10,000 USD) to Microsoft Corporation. The charges could result in 5 years of imprisonment. The unlicensed copies were pre-installed on the computers by the original equipment manufacturer prior to the school's purchase. Ultimately, Ponosov was found not guilty. This case caused significant controversy in Russian mass media and blogs as well as among Russian politicians and lawyers (especially copyright law experts).

== Case details ==
In early 2005, Ponosov's school bought 20 new PCs with preinstalled Microsoft software. In late May 2006, a procursive inspection revealed unlicensed copies of Microsoft software on 12 of the 20 computers. When the academic year began in September 2006, students were taught information science in front of inoperative computers.

== Court history ==
Ponosov pleaded not guilty in his first hearing.

On 9 January 2007, a second hearing was conducted in the town of Vereshchagino, Perm Krai before Judge Vera Barakina. The prosecution presented a bill of particulars as well as witnesses. Official representatives of the injured party, Microsoft Corporation, did not appear.

A third hearing was held on 29 January 2007. Representatives of Microsoft's regional dealer stated that the employee who had sold the computers with unlicensed copies of Windows was imposed a fine of 10,000 rubles (about 380 US dollars).

During the fourth hearing on 12 February 2007 Ponosov refused to apologize to Microsoft in order to settle the case. The prosecution demanded that Ponosov be fined 3,000 rubles (about $115). Surprisingly, Judge Barakina closed the case on February 15 "for insignificance"; this left both parties unsatisfied with prosecutors deciding to appeal, on the basis that the decision was "unlawful", while Ponosov filed an appeal, demanding a not guilty verdict.

On 27 March 2007 Perm Krai court set aside the decision of the court of first instance and remitted the case for reconsideration.

On 7 May 2007 the trial court found that Ponosov had caused Microsoft damages of 266,000 roubles and ruled that Ponosov was guilty while fining him 5,000 roubles ($194.4).

On 19 December 2008 Perm Krai court repealed the sentence of Vereshchagino's court and found Ponosov not guilty.

== Opinions ==
=== Vladimir Putin ===
During a press conference in the Kremlin on 1 February 2007, Russian president Vladimir Putin said: “If the legislation which, as I see, is not very adequate, needs to be amended, then we will reflect on this. But to grab someone for buying a computer somewhere and start threatening him with prison, is complete nonsense, simply ridiculous.”

=== Mikhail Gorbachev and Alexander Lebedev ===
On 5 February 2007 Mikhail Gorbachev (ex-president of the USSR) and Alexander Lebedev (deputy of Russian State Duma) published in Novaya Gazeta an open letter to Bill Gates (chairman of Microsoft) requesting withdrawal of the action against Alexander Ponosov. Microsoft responded with statement from Microsoft Russia chairman Olga Dergunova that "Microsoft did not instigate the prosecution against Mr. Ponosov. This case was initiated by Russian authorities under Russian law" and that they "do not believe that a case of this kind warrants criminal prosecution".

=== Microsoft ===
On 3 February 2007, Microsoft Corporation's Russian office published a statement saying that Microsoft does not consider this case a malignant copyright violation, and Microsoft did not claim and would not claim in the future any civil suit against Ponosov.
