= Sepych =

Sepych Сепыч
- Selo
- Location within Perm Krai Location within Russia
- Coordinates: 58°11′N 54°08′E
- Country: Russia
- Region: Perm Krai
- District: Vereshchaginsky District
- Time zone: UTC+5:00

Sepych (Russian: Сепыч) is a rural locality (a selo) in Vereshchaginsky District, Perm Krai, Russia. The population was 1,264 as of 2010. There are 19 streets.

== Geography ==
Sepych is located 45 km northwest of Vereshchagino (the district's administrative centre) by road. Yenino is the nearest rural locality.
