= Akademset =

Soviet version of the Internet

Akademset planned structure

Akademset (Russian: Академсеть, Academic Network), or All-Union Academic network, was a computer network that digitally connected scientific and civil institutions across the Soviet Union established in 1978. It was a Soviet forerunner to the Internet and had a connection with ARPANET and other Western analogues using the common digital standard called X.25. After the dissolution of the Soviet Union it was re-created under the name ROKSON (РОКСОН), and nowadays its surviving components may be considered as a local area network within the Runet and the Internet.

== Creation and development ==
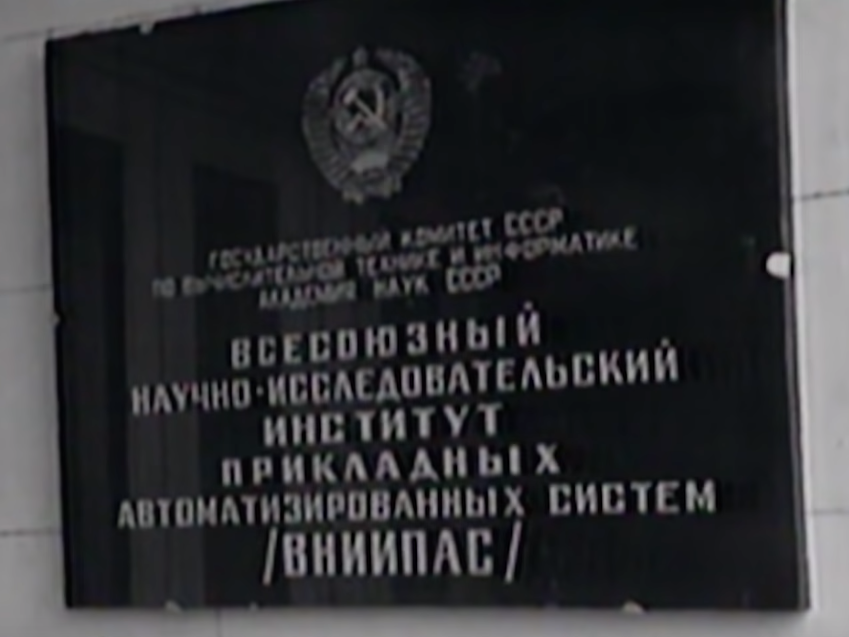
VNIIPAS signboard

=== LVC ===
In 1974 in Leningrad, at the Ioffe Physical-Technical Institute, a computing subdivision was established that was entitled Leningrad Computing Center (ЛВЦ/LVC) of the Academy of Sciences of the Soviet Union (АН СССР/AN SSSR). The main goal of LVC was the creation of the Computing Center for Collective Use (ВЦКП/VCKP) for staff of all of the institutions (over 40) of the Leningrad Scientific Center (ЛНЦ/LNC). It was proven effective, that was specially remarked by AN SSSR and the authorities of the city and the country, and by the end of 1977 the VCKP was used by over 15 city's scientific institutions, that exploited computer performance of the Center. Following that, the Presidium of the AN SSSR asked the Government of the Soviet Union to convert LVC into the Leningrad Research Computer Center (ЛНИВЦ/LNIVC) that was founded on January 19, 1978. Non-academic institutions, including factories, began to join its computing network. The network became known as ИВСКП/IVSKP — "Information and computing system for collective use".

LNIVC was in fact functioning as a central node of the forming city-wide computer network which began to be called LIVSAN/ЛИВСАН — "Leningrad information-computer network of the AN" (SSSR). In 1979 scientists at the AN considered it to be a success and began planning such network country-wide under the name Akademset. In 1978 LNIVC was reformed into an institution nowadays known as St. Petersburg Institute for Informatics and Automation of the Russian Academy of Sciences.

In 1982 in Moscow, a dedicated research institution, VNIIPAS, was established to serve as the central node of the Akademset with the abroad X.25 connection to Austria to International Institute for Applied Systems Analysis. Links to most of "socialist countries" were also established, including satellite ones to Cuba, Mongolia and Vietnam.

=== NATO study ===
In 1986 in Brussels, a NATO analysis was published, entitled "The Status of Soviet Civil Science". It contained a dedicated section about Akademset, including its planned all-Union scheme. It was stated that "the first phase of the network was accepted for operation in 1986 by a governmental commission, including about 55 interactive computers". The book also reads:

"The initial problems encountered in building Akademset’ have stemmed from the communications and hardware limitations ... For instance, in order to achieve high speeds using a protocol such as OSI, it is necessary to have sufficient main memory in order to pass packets and headers from level to level ... Shortages of communications peripherals remain, and the cost of leased lines remains high ... These problems can be solved largely by better hardware. More serious is the absence of trained personnel at the centers that are supposed to be connected to Akademset’." <...>
"Will the Communist Party of the USSR (CPSU) permit electronic mail? On the surface, it would appear to amount to electronic publishing without censorship, because messages could be sent practically instantaneously to a large number of users. However, the CPSU may also view electronic mail as nothing more than a faster version of regular mail. It would be possible to delay the delivery of some messages while they were checked, to use random searches, and to monitor all transactions by individuals under surveillance. The interference could be crude enough that most users would be aware of it and would practice self-censorship, particularly in communications with foreigners. The party could reap the benefit of more efficient communications without a substantial threat of increased activity by dissidents."

=== Hudson study ===
USA's Hudson Institute published a research of Akademset in 1989. It emphasizes resemblance of Akademset to early ARPANET and also reads:

"The general architecture of Akademset' is that of a meta-network of regional networks . The various regional networks, in turn, are presently divided into two "zones": the working zone and the experimental zone. The latter is developmental in nature and the place where new network solutions are tried and tested after which, in theory, the accepted designs are passed to industry for production and implementation in the working zone. Among the basic architectural solutions already accepted for Akademset' is the decision to make it an open, packet switching network with a modified ISO X .25 layer protocol implemented throughout . Users are to have access, from their individual terminals, " ...to all information resources (data banks, information systems, mathematical models, computer capabilities, etc .)"

== See also ==
- OGAS
- St. Petersburg Institute for Informatics and Automation of the Russian Academy of Sciences
- Cybernetics in the Soviet Union
- Internet in Russia
