= Nikolai Yuryevich Sobolev =

Russian blogger (born 1993)

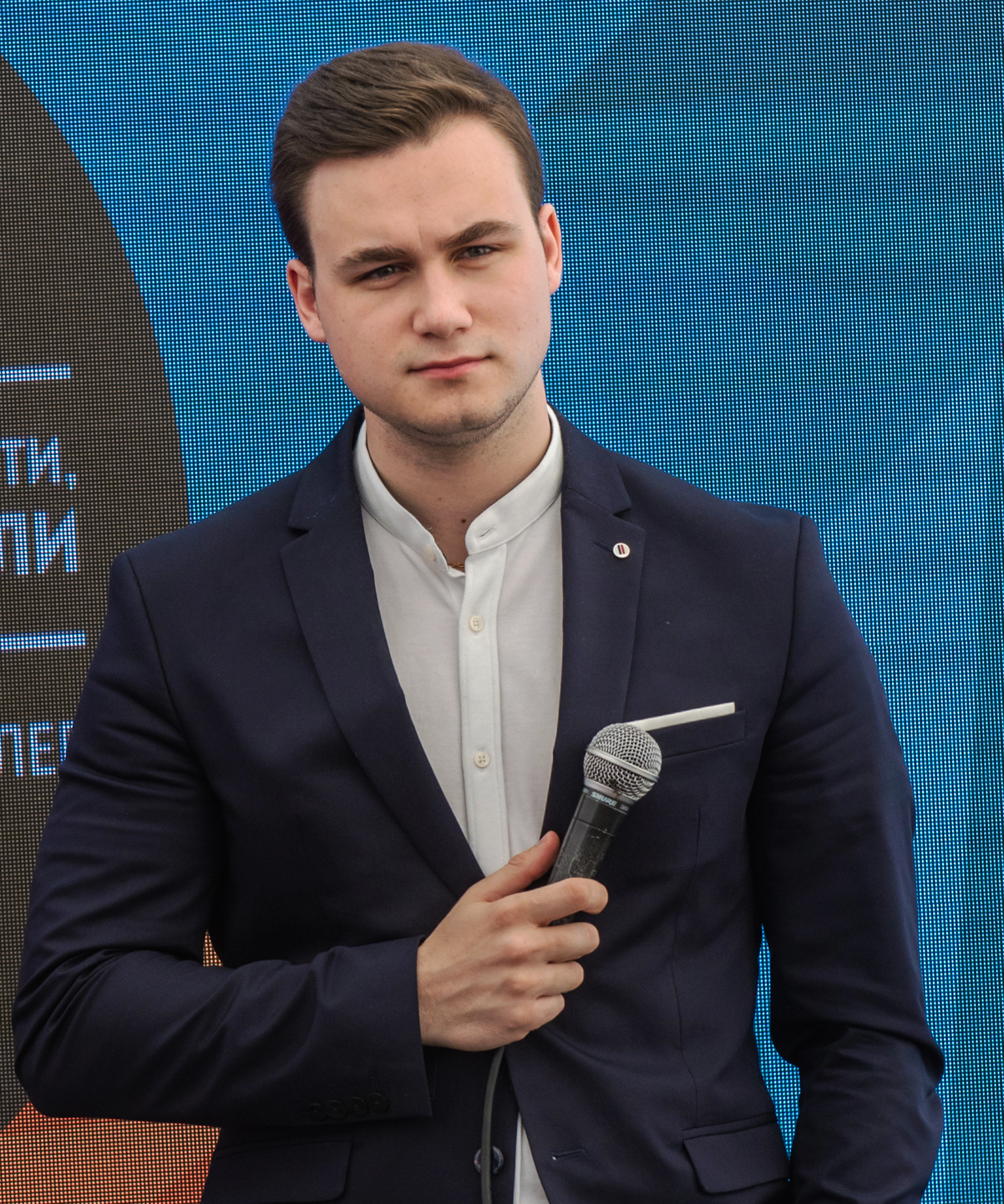
- Sobolev in 2018
- Born: July 18, 1993 (age 33); Saint Petersburg, Russia
- Other name: SOBOLEV

YouTube information
- Channel: SOBOLEV
- Years active: 2014-present
- Subscribers: 4.9 million
- Views: 732 million
- Last updated: 20 October 2025

Nikolai Yuryevich Sobolev (Russian: Николай Юрьевич Соболев; born June 18, 1993) is a Russian video blogger, writer, businessman and singer. He is the creator and host of the YouTube channel SOBOLEV (formerly Zhizn YouTube; Russian: Жизнь Ютуб until 2016), where he talks about drama with the Russian side of YouTube. Sobolev is one of the co-founders of two YouTube collectives - "Rakamakafo" and "Ready Steady Go".

== Life and career ==
=== Early life ===
Sobolev was born on June 18, 1993, in St. Petersburg. During his school years he studied at Gymnasium No. 56. Sobolev graduated from the Faculty of Economics and Management of St. Petersburg Polytechnic University.

=== 2010s ===
He got his first recognition on the Internet by filming pranks and social experiments for the project "Rakamakafo" together with Guram Narmania, his friend from university. For this project in June 2015 they won the award of the magazine "Sobaka.ru" - "TOP 50. The most famous people of St. Petersburg" in the "Media" category. Four months later, together with the community in VKontakte - "Zhizn YouTube" (abbreviated as "ZhYu") - he launched a YouTube channel of the same name, in which he covered the activities of Russian video bloggers and current events of Runet in an analytical format. In 2016, he renamed his YouTube channel to "SOBOLEV" and focused on discussing high-profile public topics (at the same time, the Telegram channel of the same name "ZhYu" continued to develop as an independent project, independent from Nikolai, retaining the former name). He became widely known after discussing the Diana Shurygina rape case. At the time of the discussion of this topic, his channel became the fastest growing in the world.

On March 9, 2017, together with other popular bloggers, he participated in a meeting with Russian Minister of Culture Vladimir Medinsky. The purpose of the meeting was to discuss topical ways of interacting with the younger generation, in particular to discuss popularization of education and culture.

He is the author of the book "YouTube. The Path to Success. How to get tons of likes and tons of money" and "The New YouTube. The Way to Success. How to Get Furies of Likes and Tons of Money".

On August 10, 2017, Sobolev announced the game show "Sobolev Bombit" exclusively on the social network VK. The show was produced by the WildJam agency, and the general sponsor was Yandex.Taxi. There were 12 episodes in total, which were posted once a week. The format of the show resembled the game show "Taxi", which was aired from 2005 to 2009 on TNT.

On June 3, 2018, there were reports that Sobolev was attacked by unknown people; he allegedly suffered a closed head injury and a concussion. It later turned out that it was a social experiment made by Nikolai himself, who wanted to test how easy it was to make a throw-in.

On July 6, 2018, an advertisement for Gorky Park made by Nikolai was released, which was used by Sergei Sobyanin in his election program. According to the blogger, he was not notified that it would be used for such purposes.

=== 2020s ===
In late September 2022, Russian media and anonymous Telegram channels spread information that Sobolev had left the country because of the risk of being mobilized. Earlier, the blogger repeatedly stated that he was not going to leave the country. Later, Nikolai denied rumors of a change of residence and confirmed that he was abroad, insisting that it was a short-term trip. On October 11, Sobolev returned to St. Petersburg.

Since the beginning of Russian invasion of Ukraine, Nikolai Sobolev has been making videos on political topics in which he previously held moderate views. His statements did not agree with both the liberal-opposition agenda and the theses of official Russian propaganda, in connection with which on February 3, 2023, the Russian Ministry of Justice included Sobolev in the register of foreign agents. On March 15, 2024, he was removed from the register "due to the loss of signs of being a foreign agent.
