= Russian Internet Forum =

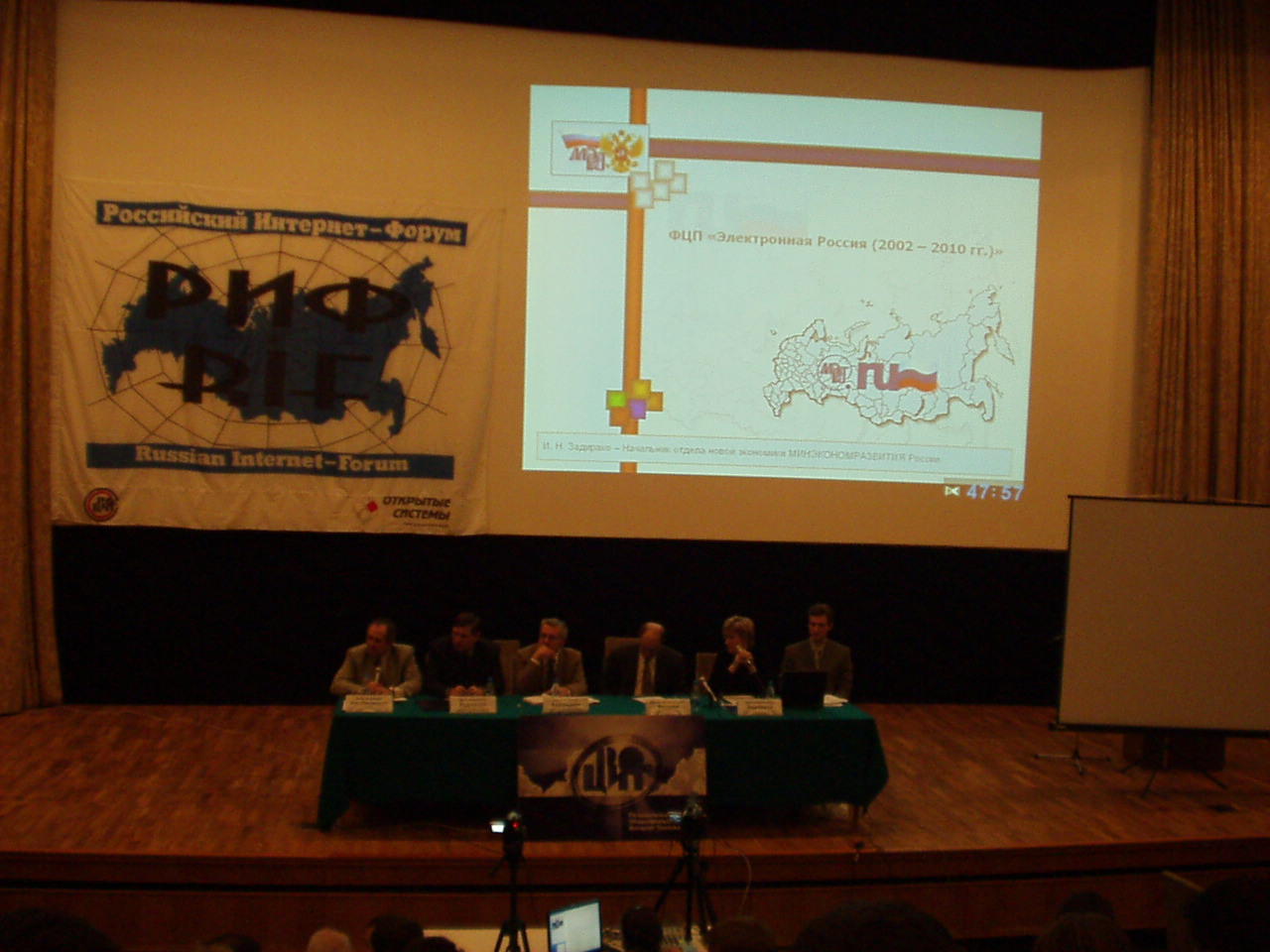
Government officials report to Russian Internet Forum on the "Electronic Russia" programme in 2005

Russian Internet Forum (RIF) is the annual conference where people who feel they build the Runet meet.

Those include members of Russian telecom and software industries, representatives of various Internet businesses and state institutions such as Federal Agency on Press and Mass Communications (FAPMC), Ministry for Economic Development and Trade, Ministry for Communications and Informatization of the Russian Federation.

The event is held every year in March or April since 1997 and usually lasts 3 days. The main site for it is the rest home complex "Lesnye Dali" (Forest Expanses), which is operated by the Affair Management Office of the President of the Russian Federation, in Gorky-10 settlement in the Odintsovo district of Moscow Oblast.

In 2003 a simultaneous subsidiary conference was also held in Perm city. Since 2006 a RIF-related series of smaller conferences is held in 10 large Russian cities under the brand of "All-Russian Internet Marathon".

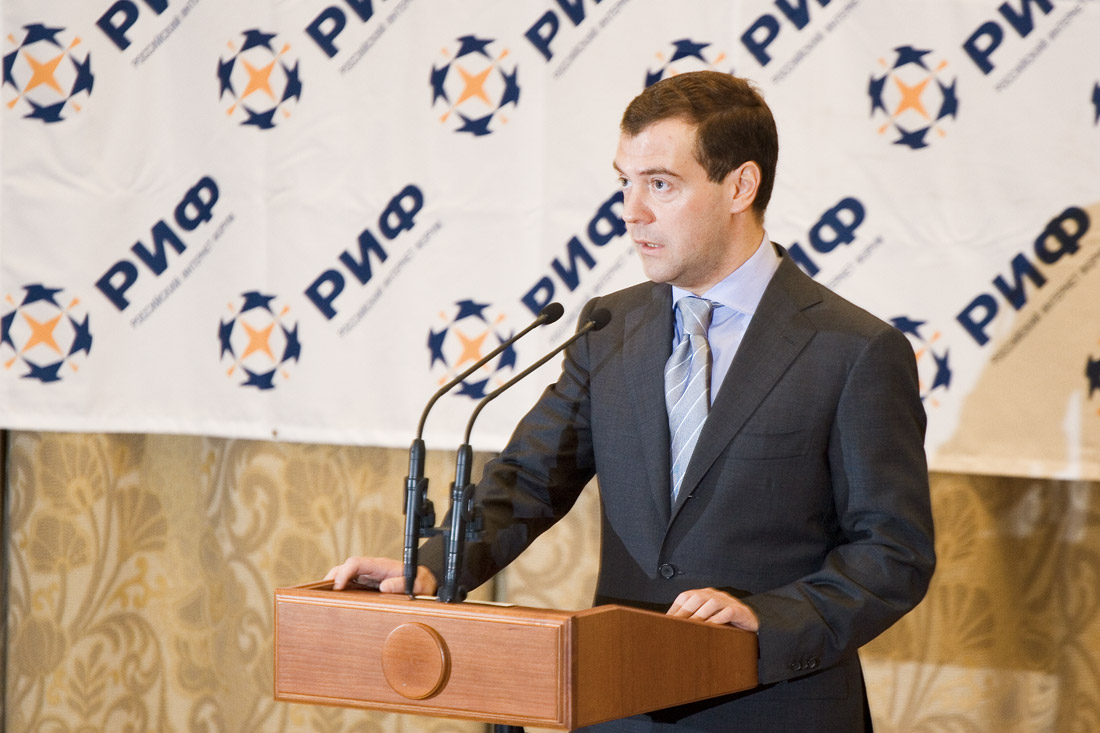
Dmitry Medvedev addresses RIF-2008

There are several sponsors, the main organizer of the event is the non-profit organization ROCIT (Regional Social Center for Internet Technologies) which is related to FAPMC and also organizes the Runet Prize.

On April 3, 2008, the 12th RIF was opened by the president-elect of the Russian Federation Dmitry Medvedev.
