= VNIIPAS =

Soviet computer research institute

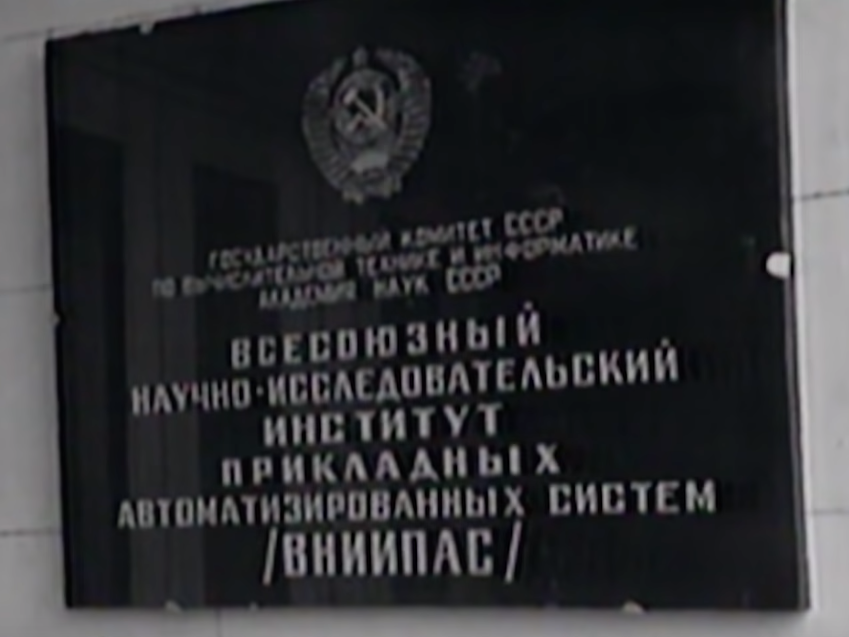
The entrance signboard at VNIIPAS (Gosteleradio screenshot, 1988)

The All Union Scientific Research Institute for Applied Automated Systems (Russian: Всесоюзный научно-исследовательский институт прикладных автоматизированных систем, Acronym: ВНИИПАС/VNIIPAS) was a Soviet research institute that provided a computer network service, including international digital connections. It was the central node of inner USSR scientific data network called Akademset.

VNIIPAS derived from 1976-established VNIISI/ВНИИСИ which was a partner project of Austrian International Institute for Applied Systems Analysis (IIASA).

== History ==
The IIASA at Laxenburg, Austria was created in 1972 as a joint USSR-USA effort to establish global scientific communications through the Club of Rome.

VNIIPAS operated from 1982 until 1995.

In 1983 VNIIPAS, Joel Schatz, Don Carlson, Michael Kleeman, Chet Watson, and George Soros created the joint telecommunication venture San Francisco — Moscow Teleport (SFMT), later known as Sovam Teleport ("Soviet-American teleport") that operated digital connections between USSR and USA and later became the SWIFT provider for the Soviet banking system.

== Books ==
- The Status of Soviet Civil Science: Proceedings of the Symposium on Soviet Scientific Research, NATO Headquarters, Brussels, Belgium, September 24–26, 1986
- Judy, Richard; Clough, Robert (1989). "Soviet Computer Software and Applications in the 1980s" (PDF). Archived from the original (PDF) on 20 September 2020.
- Goodman, Seymour; McHenry, William; Wolcott, Peter (1989). "Scientific Computing in the Soviet Union". Computers in Physics. 3 (1): 39. Bibcode:1989ComPh...3...39G. doi:10.1063/1.4822814.
- Russia Telecom Laws and Regulations Handbook Volume 1 Strategic Information, Regulations, Contacts, 2008
- Culture and Technology in the New Europe: Civic Discourse in Transformation in Post-communist Nations, 2000
