= Coordination Center for TLD RU =

The Coordination Center for TLD .RU/.РФ (Russian: «Координационный центр доменов .RU/.РФ») is the administrator of Top Level National Domains .RU and .PФ. It serves as the national registry.

== Mandate ==
The Coordination Center is mandated to not develop terms and conditions for registration of domain names in zones .RU and .РФ, accreditation of registrars and development of prospective projects connected with the evolution of top-level domains in Russia. The Centers' main objective is to ensure stable and resilient functioning of the DNS infrastructure of the Russian segment of the Internet.

== Formation ==
The Coordination Center (CC) was founded in 2001 as a non-profit organization, whose founders were the public and governmental organization "Russian Association of Networks and Services" (RANS), Internet Providers Union (IPU), Regional Organization "Center for Internet Technologies" (CIT) and Russian Institute for Public Networks (RIPN). Since the date of the CC's creation the domain names registration system in Russia has been reorganized: the national registry's administrative and technical functions were separated, operational procedure with end-users was improved; registrars' accreditation procedures were adopted, a new protocol of interaction between the system users was introduced, and the normative basis of the new registration system was developed.

In its activity the Coordination Center relies on the experience of international organizations, such as the Internet Corporation for Assigned Names and Numbers (ICANN), which coordinates issues of allocation of domain names and IP addresses, ensures stable and resilient functioning of unique systems of Internet identifiers, the Council of European National Top Level Domains (CENTR), the Asia Pacific Top Level Domain Association (APTLD), which represent regional associations of national registries, the International Telecommunication Union (ITU), and the Internet Governance Forum (IGF), among others.

== Mission ==
To ensure Internet development in the Russian Federation for the benefit of the national and global Internet community.

== Duties ==
- administration of Top Level National Domain .RU
- introduction and administration of the new Cyrillic Top Level National Domain .РФ, which was launched in 2010
- provision of technological development of domains .RU/.РФ infrastructure
- development of regulatory documents for domains .RU/.РФ
- accreditation of registrars in domains .RU and .РФ
- representation of Russia in the international Internet organizations
- support of social projects designed to promote and develop the Internet

== Governing ==
The CC's Board is its highest governing body. The Board consists of 13 members, who are elected from a pool of experts in the sphere of addressing and domain space of the Internet, and prominent figures of the Russian Internet community. The Board also co-opts a representative of the RF Ministry of Telecommunications and Mass Media. The term of each board member does not exceed 3 years. Each year elections are held to choose 4 new board members in place of those whose term expired. The Board appoints the CC's CEO. Discussion of projects related to organizational and technical issues of domain name registration in .RU and .РФ takes place within the framework of the CC's advisory bodies (working groups and committees).

== Technical Center of Internet ==
In 2009 the Coordination Center and the Foundation for Internet Development (registry of domain .SU) co-founded the Technical Center of Internet (TCI). The TCI provides technical support for main registries and registration systems of national domains .RU, .РФ and .SU ensures DNS resilience of the Russian segment of the Internet and the Internet as a whole. The creation of the TCI has led to the unification and simplification of registration procedures, thus ensuring the stability of Russian Top Level National Domains .RU, .РФ and .SU and the improved quality of services provided to the registrars.

== Registrars ==
Since 1 June 2001, the registrars accredited by the Coordination Center have startled providing domain name registration services to end-users in Russia. In 2011, the number of accredited registrars hit 25. Among them are companies from Moscow, St. Petersburg, and Samara. However, some registrars rapidly develop affiliate networks (Internet and hosting providers, web studios usually participate in affiliate networks programs), which provide services throughout the country. Thus, any user who is interested in domain name registration can easily use this service.

The Coordination Center administrates the Top Level National Domains .RU/.РФ, i.e. serves as the national registry. The national registry shall maintain the database of registered second-level domain names and support the functioning of these names on the Internet. The Coordination Center is not a registrar and it does not exercise a direct domain names registration, but just determines the domain names registration policy in the administered top-level domains.

== National domains .ru and .рф ==
As the administrator of the national domains .RU and .РФ, the Coordination Center places special emphasis on their promotion, expansion of domains use by individuals and corporations, and, consequently, growth of a number of registered second-level domains, as well as on raising awareness of the Russian Internet users regarding the domain names registration system. The high level of credibility, resilience, and stability of the national domains .RU and .РФ, as well as provision of high-quality services to the expert community, contribute both to greater use of the Internet resources and a considerable growth in the number of Internet users and to further development of the Internet in Russia.

The TLD .RU's leading position among the biggest top-level national domains worldwide was fueled by one of the highest domain name growth rates over the last 5 years. Russian domain .RU is one of the biggest top-level domains in terms of the total number of registered domain names among the existing national and generic domains. Delegated in 2010, IDN TLD .РФ is the new Cyrillic domain, which has already demonstrated record-breaking growth rates with 700,000 domain names registered in less than two months from the date of its launch and as such immediately joined the 20 biggest European top-level national domains.

== Events ==
The Coordination Center for TLD RU regularly holds various events for the market players. Principal among them are:

- The Russian Internet Governance Forum. The objective of the Russian Internet Governance Forum is to bring together all professional perspectives and organize discussion aimed at the quest for consensus between government agencies, ITS expert community, the business community, and the civil society on the issues of promotion of the Internet in Russia. The Forum became a benchmark for the proactive participation of Russian representatives in the activities of international organizations, which deal with Internet governance issues.
- International Conference of Administrators and Registrars of Top Level National Domains of the CIS, Eastern, and Central Europe. The conference's main objective is to engage leading registrars from various top-level national domains in the discussion of the issues related to the Internet and the organization of interaction between registrars and registries of different national domains. It becomes pressing especially now when it is national segments of the global network that are developing particularly actively.

== Documents ==
- Agreement on Cooperation between the Ministry of Telecommunications and Mass Media of the Russian Federation and the Coordination Center for TLD RU on Issues of National Domain .RU Governance
- Agreement on Cooperation between the Ministry of Telecommunications and Mass Media of the Russian Federation and the Coordination Center for TLD RU on Issues of National Domain .РФ Governance
- Terms and Conditions of Domain Names Registration in domain .RU
- Terms and Conditions of Domain Names Registration in Domain .РФ
