= Careware =

Software licensed in a way that benefits a charity

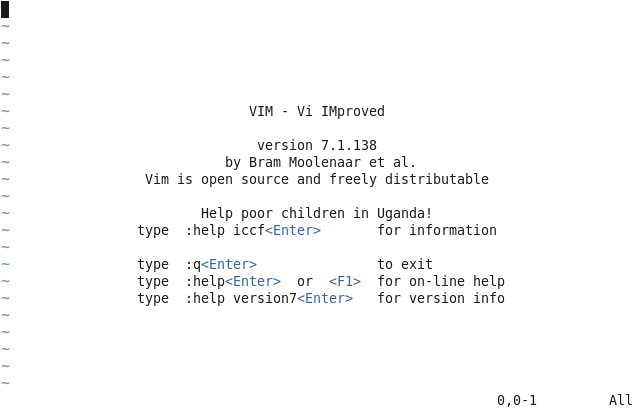
The Vim text editor is an example of careware. It famously features a message on the about screen encouraging users to donate to ICCF Holland.

Careware (also called charityware, helpware, or goodware) is software licensed in a way that benefits a charity. Some careware is distributed free, and the author suggests that some payment be made to either a nominated charity, or a charity of the user's choice. Commercial careware, on the other hand, includes a levy for charity on top of the distribution charge. Careware can also involve a barter of some kind, or even a pledge to be kind to strangers.

== Overview ==
The term "charityware" was credited to Canadian developer Roedy Green in a 1988 issue of 2600 Magazine. One of the first known uses of the term "careware" appeared in Dr. Dobb's Journal in Al Stevens' C Programming Column in about 1991. Stevens was developing a user interface library and publishing the source code in monthly installments. To distribute code to readers, Stevens suggested they send him an addressed stamped mailer with a blank diskette. He copied the code onto the diskette and returned it. He also suggested that to express their appreciation they include a dollar, which he would donate to the local food bank in Brevard County, Florida. Stevens named this distribution method "careware."

Paul Lutus's careware idea involves no monetary exchange - instead it involves a request for the user to "stop complaining for a while and make the world a better place."

For example, the vim text editor is free software but includes a request from its author, Bram Moolenaar, that users donate to ICCF Holland for work to help AIDS victims in Uganda. Vim's Charityware license has been declared by Richard Stallman to be GPL-compatible. Another current example is MJ's CD Archiver, a file archiver for Microsoft Windows/Linux/Mac OS X. The suggested charity is NACEF, a US-registered charity for China's Project Hope.

A close variation of careware is donationware, which has a narrower definition than careware.

== Examples ==
=== Non-commercial examples ===
- FireFTP
- KiXtart
- Kye (video game)
- PeaZip
- Vim (text editor)
- Windows Live Messenger (through "i'm" initiative)

=== Commercial examples ===
- Product Red
- Humble Bundle
