= NLUUG =

Dutch association of UNIX and Linux users

NLUUG logo

The NLUUG (formerly known as The Netherlands Local Unix User Group) is an association of professional UNIX and Linux users in the Netherlands. The group aims to increase and extend the awareness and use of Open Standards (including UNIX) and similar open systems and Open Source software.

The NLUUG also maintains one of the largest FTP mirrors in the world, and is the prime FTP site for several packages including VIM.

== Activities ==
Typically, the NLUUG organises two large conferences every year. Topics over the last years include:

- IP Communication
- Languages and Tools
- E-mail and Beyond
- Visualization in Software Engineering
- Open Source in Business
- Security
- Web Applications

== History ==
The NLUUG was founded in 1983, but the initial members were active together a long time before that.

The NLUUG founded the first Internet provider in the Netherlands, NLnet. NLnet at the time only was serving businesses, which is why XS4All usually claims to be the first Internet provider (for consumers).

Other claims to fame are the founding of the SANE Conferences organization and the fact that the NLUUG was the first organisation to have Linus Torvalds be a speaker on a conference outside Finland.

== NLUUG Awards ==
The NLUUG sometime gives awards to people who have been helping the cause of Open Systems and Open Standards. Over the years, awards have been given to amongst others Piet Beertema, Guido van Rossum, Wietse Venema, Bram Moolenaar, Andy Tanenbaum, Wytze van der Raay, Teus Hagen, Olaf Kolkman and Bert Hubert.
