= EUnet =

European computer network

EUnet was a very loose collaboration of individual European UNIX sites in the 1980s that evolved into the fully commercial entity EUnet International Ltd in 1996. It was sold to Qwest in 1998. EUnet played a decisive role in the adoption of TCP/IP in Europe beginning in 1988.

A separate company, EUnet GB, was founded in 1993 in the United Kingdom, which also played a role in the early commercial Internet in the UK.

== History ==
The roots of EUnet, originally an abbreviation for European UNIX Network, go back to 1982 under the auspices of the EUUG (European UNIX Users Group), later EurOpen, and the first international UUCP connections.

FNET was the French branch of EUnet.

In Spain, the EUnet network was initially supported by the UUES (Spanish Unix Users Association), established in 1989 by a group of engineers affiliated with the ETSI UPM to operate the GOYA computer, which served as the central EUnet node in the country.

In 1992, the association’s directors and technical staff founded Goya Servicios Telemáticos S.A., which became the first commercial Internet service provider (ISP) in Spain and later joined the EUnet group as a member.

Once there was a central European backbone node that was separate from the expensive telecom network, TCP/IP was adopted in place of store and forward. This enabled EUnet to connect with NSFNET in the US and with CERN’s TCP/IP connections.

On January 1, 1990 EUnet began selling Internet access to non-academic customers in the Netherlands, making them one of the first companies to sell Internet access to the general public. EUnet provided local service through a respective national EUnet business partner in many European countries.

In 1990 the Soviet IP-based network RELCOM, mostly operated by DEMOS-powered computers, was connected to the EUnet.

EUnet GB Ltd was founded in the United Kingdom by a group of academics as a commercial Internet Service Provider (ISP) in 1993. Jim Omand, the Chairman of EUnet GB, worked with EUnet Europe to form a pan-European Eunet in 1994.

In April 1998 the company together with nearly all of the national European business partners of EUnet was sold to Qwest Communications International, which in turn later merged EUnet into the ill-fated joint-venture KPNQwest. In 2000, it was estimated that KPNQwest was carrying more than 50% of European IP traffic. Some of the ISPs operating under the name EUnet today can be traced back to the original EUnet.

=== Timeline ===
- 1982 UUCP links established between 4 countries (UK, Netherlands, Denmark and Sweden).
- 1984 kremvax April Fools Joke.
- 1986 FNET, the French branch of EUnet, converted from UUCP to TCP/IP.
- 1988 First connection in Europe to NSFnet by CWI, a Dutch computing centre.
- 1990 First offerings for "all comers".
- 1993 GBnet Ltd becomes EUnet GB Ltd.
- 1994 EUnet GB and EUnet Europe form a pan-European Eunet.
- 1994 EUnet DE purchased by UUnet.
- 1995 EUnet GB Ltd sold to PSI.
- 1996 EUnet International formed by share swaps with seven of the national organisations.
- 1998 Sale to Qwest for $154.4 million.

== Legacy ==
Most national EUnet affiliates or subsidiaries predated other commercial Internet offerings in the respective countries by many years. Until the early 1990s, nearly every European country had a telecommunications monopoly with an incumbent national PTT. Commercial and non-commercial provision of telecommunications services was prohibited or, at least, took place in a legal "grey zone". During the same period, as part of an industrial political strategy to stop US domination of future network technology, the European Community embarked on efforts to promote OSI protocols, founding for example RARE and associated national "research" network operators (DFN, SURFnet, SWITCH to name a few). During this period, EUnet played an important and decisive role in the adoption of TCP/IP in Europe, beginning in 1988.

== People ==
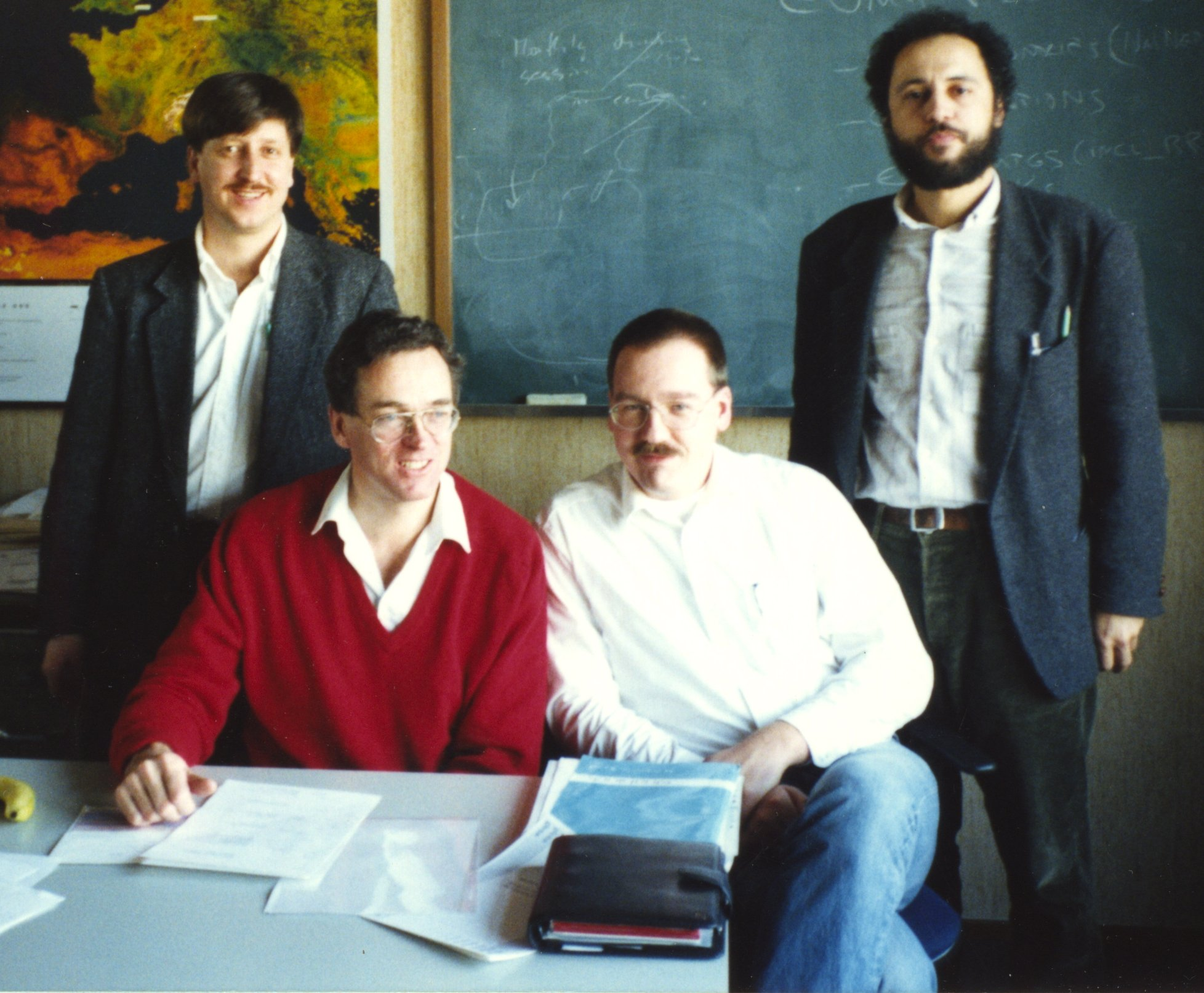
EUnet staff meeting.

The following people were involved in EUnet:

- Teus Hagen
- Daniel Karrenberg
- Piet Beertema
- Peter Collinson (EUnet GB)
- Jim Omand (EUnet GB – Chairman)
- Keld Simonsen
- Björn Eriksen
- Julf Helsingius
- Glenn Kowack
- Luc De Vos
- Michael Habeler
- Juan Antonio Esteban (Treasurer of UUES Spain).
- Pedro Sáinz Cristóbal (Vice President of UUES (Spain)).

== See also ==
- History of email
- History of the Internet
- List of United Kingdom ISPs by age
- Protocol Wars
