= Xlink (disambiguation) =

XLink (XML Linking Language) is an XML markup language.

Xlink or Xlinks may also refer to:

- XLINK (Internet service provider), an early German networking company
- Xlinks Morocco–UK Power Project or Xlinks, a proposed electricity project

== See also ==
- Xlink domain, a protein domain
- XLink Kai, video game networking software by Team XLink
- Cross-link, a bond in chemistry and biology
