= ICCF =

ICCF may refer to:

- International Conference on Cold Fusion
- International Conservation Caucus Foundation
- International Correspondence Chess Federation
- ICCF Holland (International Child Care Fund Holland), a charitable organization
