= Technical Center of Internet =

The Technical Center of Internet (Russian: Технический центр Интернет, TCI) is a Moscow-based organization founded in 2009 providing technical support of Russian national domains .ru, .рф, and .su.

The TCI provides service for the main registration system of national Russian domains, supports the DNS infrastructure of the Russian segment of the internet, deals with the registrars accredited in the Russian national domains. The organization maintains service contracts with the registrars, and provides them with technical support through license agreements signed with the Coordination Center and the FID.

== History ==
=== 1992 - 1998 ===
The TCI took over technical support of Russian national domains, which previously were under the Russian Institute for Public Networks’ (RIPN) management. In 1992, the RIPN obtained the status of a public non-profit organization, with the objective of developing internet infrastructure and scientific networks, as well as administration of national domains .su and .ru. This was followed by the centralized registration of the original list of domains, which consisted of geographical domains and prototypes of the generic domains: com.ru, edu.ru, gov.ru, among others.

The RIPN turned to the technical support of the Russian segment of the Internet and to the registration of second-level domains in zone .ru, while the Steering Group was busy developing the operational provisions for this zone.

From 1994 - 1998, the number of Internet users rapidly increased, leading to the growth of the Russian internet to expand beyond scientific and academic networks, into news sites, electronic libraries, search engines, and commercial web sites.

=== 1999 - 2008 ===
In 1999, The Steering Group's changed the domain registration in zone .ru, and created the Institute of Independent Registrars: while also remaining the technical center of the Russian top level national domain .ru.

The RIPN transferred its functions of domains registration to independent companies while maintaining access to the registry. RU-CENTER, the RIPN's subsidiary company, became the first registrar in January 2001.

In 2002, The Steering Group disbanded and transferred its functions to an independent non-profit organization, The Coordination Center for TLD RU, to undertake the development of terms and conditions and organization of all activities in domain .ru. RIPN continued to serve as the technical support of Russian national domains, but by 2009 the Russian internet structure had grown too large for RIPN to manage.

=== 2009 - current ===
The TCI was founded in 2009 by two Russian registries – ANO “The Coordination Center for TLD RU” and the Foundation for Internet Development (FID), which are administrators of the top-level domains .ru (until 2018), .рф, and .su. Its creation was primarily due to the accelerating growth rate of domain names in domains .ru and .su from 2007 to 2009.

The Cyrillic domain .РФ was also launched, which required technical support. At the time, the ANO Coordination Center for TLD RU and the Foundation for Internet Development (FID) decided to create the Technical Center of Internet as an organization, which would focus entirely on the technical support of the Russian domain space. The RIPN has transferred these functions to the TCI, focusing primarily on research.

In 2018, the Coordinating Center of the national .ru domain transferred the function of the domain registry operator to the structure of Rostelecom.

== Technological platform ==
The TCI is responsible for resilience of the principal resource of the Internet in Russia. The TCI manages the automatic electronic system of registration and administration of domains .ru, .su, .рф and technical means needed to provide primary service for these domains’ DNS servers. The network of DNS nameservers for the allocation of second-level domain zones is located not only in Russia but worldwide. Its operability, by a contract with the TCI, is ensured by the operator of a group of regional Internet Exchange Points (IXes) – MSK-IX, which also connects to the Internet and ensures external network protection of software and hardware complex of the RU/РФ/SU registration system.

The Moscow and St. Petersburg TCI nodes are connected by dual communication channels operating two different fiber optic systems, as well as with fully independent access to the Internet and connection to the Moscow and St. Petersburg IXes. The system's support is ensured by the proper service of systems administrators, as well as by the service of 24/7 network monitoring. Each node's equipment is duplicated. Only one node is operable at a time, and the second one is on hot standby. In the event the first node fails the second one steps in. In the event of maintenance works at one of the nodes, functioning proceeds as stated before.

=== Security ===
The Moscow network node facility has a layered security system: the perimeter of the entire territory of the Russian Research Center (the Kurchatov Institute) is guarded, the building is provided with independent round–the-clock security, and the data processing center KIAEHOUSE has a check-point system and 24/7 video surveillance. The data center is equipped with a modern fire-fighting system that uses an inert gas, which is harmless to the equipment in case of activation. The computer center building of the Oktiabrskaya Railway Company represents secured premises of the technological complex, which boasts of robust industrial systems of ensuring equipment resilience. The distributed network of DNS nodes located in 7 Russian federal okrugs, as well as in Europe and America has reiterative redundancy at the hardware and network levels, optimal connectivity of the DNS nodes with networks of Russian and foreign operators and 24/7 technical support, which ensures service accessibility at 99.99% from any Internet access point.

== Location ==
The Network of the domain names registration system is a geographically distributed structure. Technologically similar nodes are located in Moscow and St. Petersburg.

The second node is located in St. Petersburg on a technological platform of the data center of the Oktiabrskaya Railway's computer center.

== See also ==
- RIPN
