= Beertema =

Beertema is a surname. Notable people with the surname include:

- Piet Beertema (born 1943), Dutch internet pioneer
- Harm Beertema (born 1952), Dutch politician and educator
