= DEMOS (Internet service provider) =

First internet service provider in the USSR

DEMOS (Demos) was the first internet service provider in the USSR.

== History ==
DEMOS was established in 1989 in Moscow as a programmers' cooperative, which included employees of the Kurchatov Institute. For the first few months, the cooperative was called "Interface"; then it was renamed in honor of the DEMOS operating system. In 1990, DEMOS, in cooperation with the scientific network Relkom, registered a top-level domain .su. This domain become the starting point for development of the Russian segment of the Internet - RUnet.

== See also ==
- Kremvax
