= Internet exchange points in Russia =

Public Internet exchange points in Russia are MSK-IX in Moscow, Eurasia Peering in Moscow, SPB-IX in Saint-Petersburg, SAMARA-IX in Samara, Ix-NN (Nizhny Novgorod), NSK-IX in Novosibirsk, and KRS-IX in Krasnoyarsk in Kazan and DataIX in Saint-Petersburg, Moscow, Novosibirsk.

The most popular of these is the MSK-IX, with over 320 members and over 140 Gbit/s steady throughput during peak hours of the weekdays.

On the territory of NSK-IX, RIPE operates a mirror of its k.root-servers.net.

== See also ==
- Moscow Internet Exchange (MSK-IX)
