= Wijnjewoude =

Wijnjewoude Wynjewâld
- Village
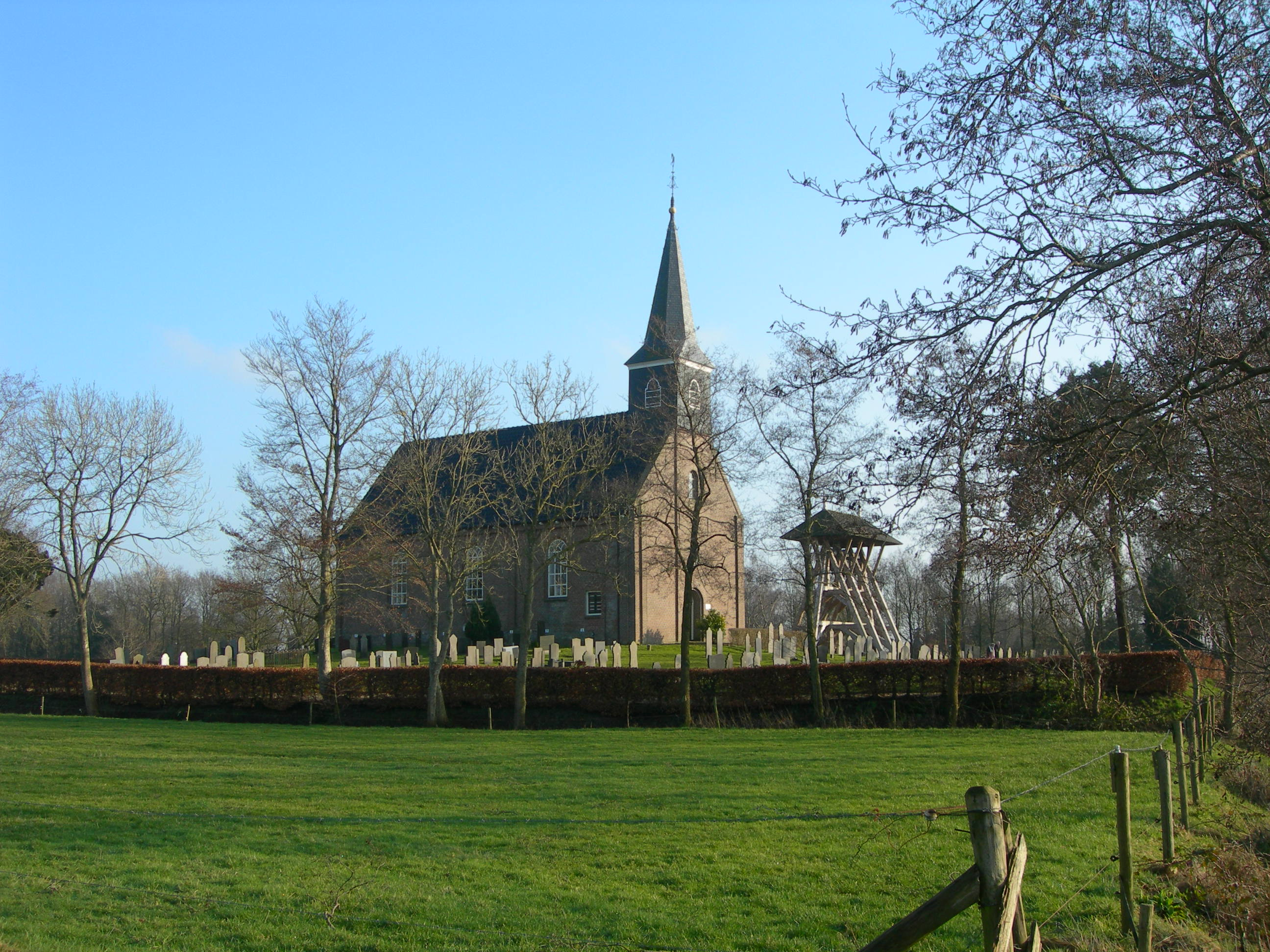
- Wijnjewoude church

- Coat of arms

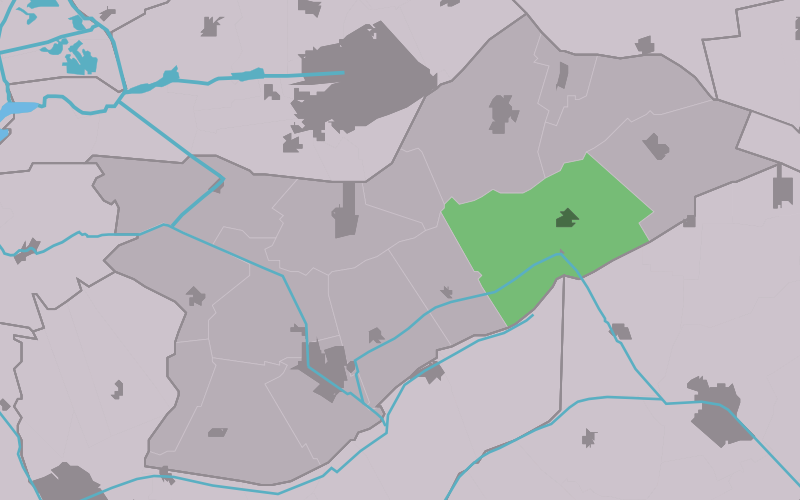
- Location in Opsterland municipality

- Location in the Netherlands Wijnjewoude (Netherlands)
- Country: Netherlands
- Province: Friesland
- Municipality: Opsterland

Area
  - Total: 28.64 km^{2} (11.06 sq mi)
- Elevation: 4 m (13 ft)

Population (2021)
  - Total: 2,055
  - Density: 71.75/km^{2} (185.8/sq mi)
- Time zone: UTC+1 (CET)
  - Summer (DST): UTC+2 (CEST)
- Postal code: 9241
- Dialing code: 0516
- Website: Official

Wijnjewoude (West Frisian: Wynjewâld) is a village in the municipality of Opsterland in the east of Friesland, the Netherlands. It had a population of around 2,025 in January 2017. The villages of Duurswoude and Wijnjeterp were founded in the late Middle Ages next to one-another. After World War II the villages started to expand, and merged into a single village called Wijnjewoude in 1974.

== History ==
Wijntjeterp was first mentioned in 1315 as Weningawalde, and means "terp of Wine (person)". Duurswoude was first mentioned in 1505 as "Bakkeffeen alias Dyoertswolt", and means "wood of Djoerd (person)". The villages developed on a sandy ridge during the late middle ages. During the 18th century, the peat is the area was excavated.

The Dutch Reformed church of Duurwoude dated from the 13th century, but was rebuilt in the 15th century and modified in the late 18th century. The church of Wijnjewoude dates from 1778, and has a bell tower with three bells.

Duurwoude was home to 238 people in 1840, and Wijnjeterp had 728 inhabitants.

== Notable people ==
- Teus Hagen (1945), internet pioneer.

== Gallery ==
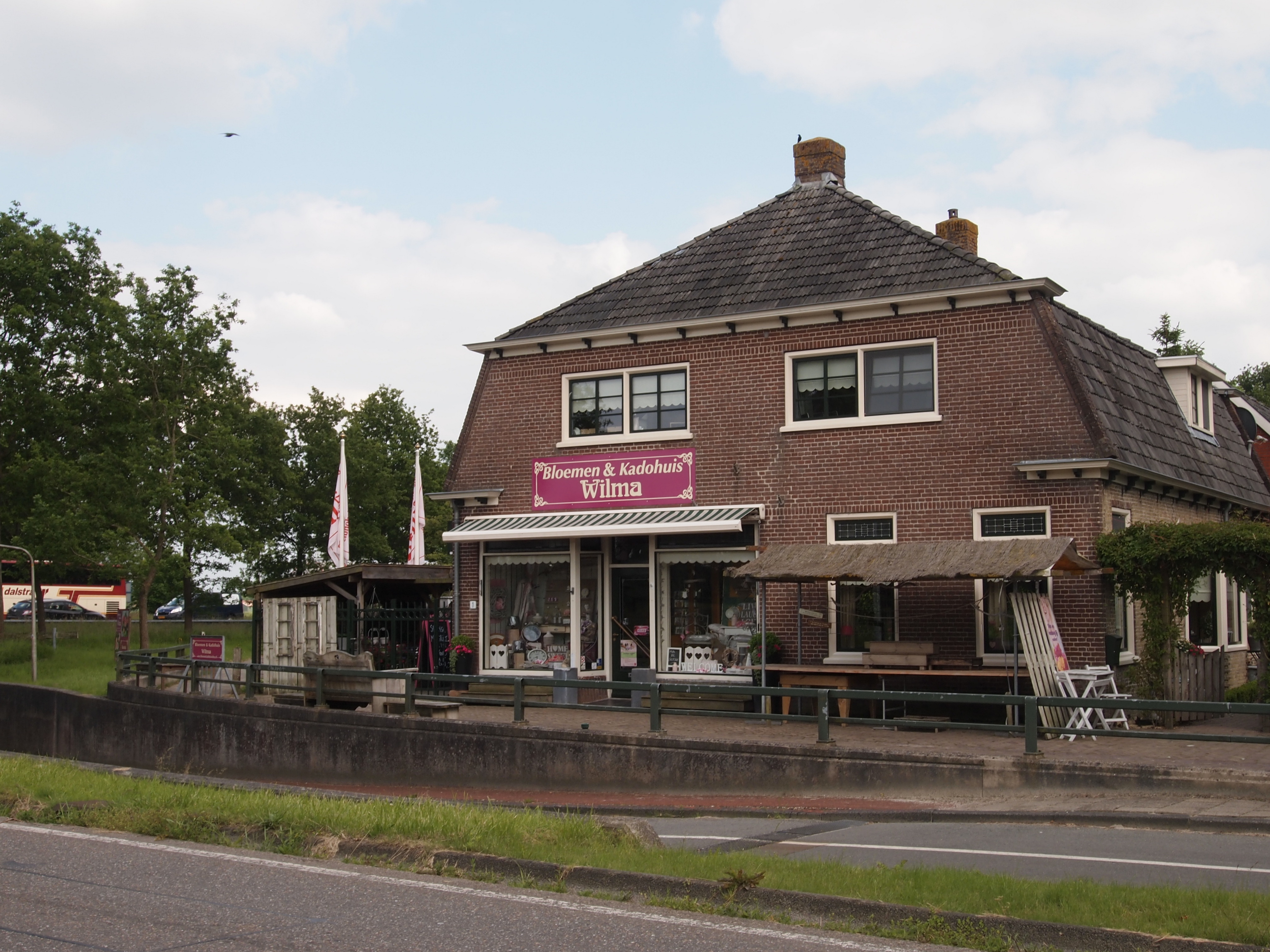
Flower and gift shop

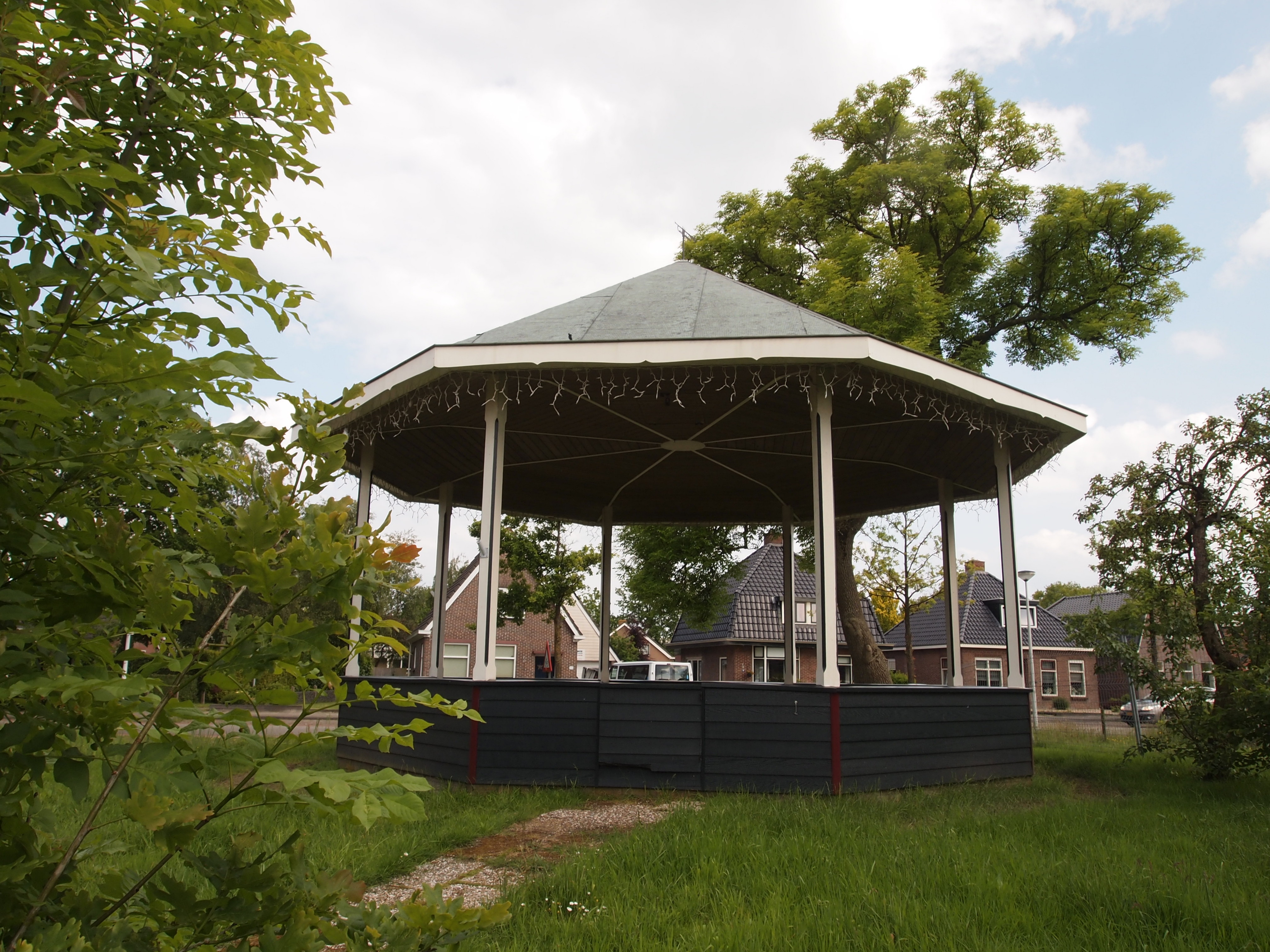
Bandstand

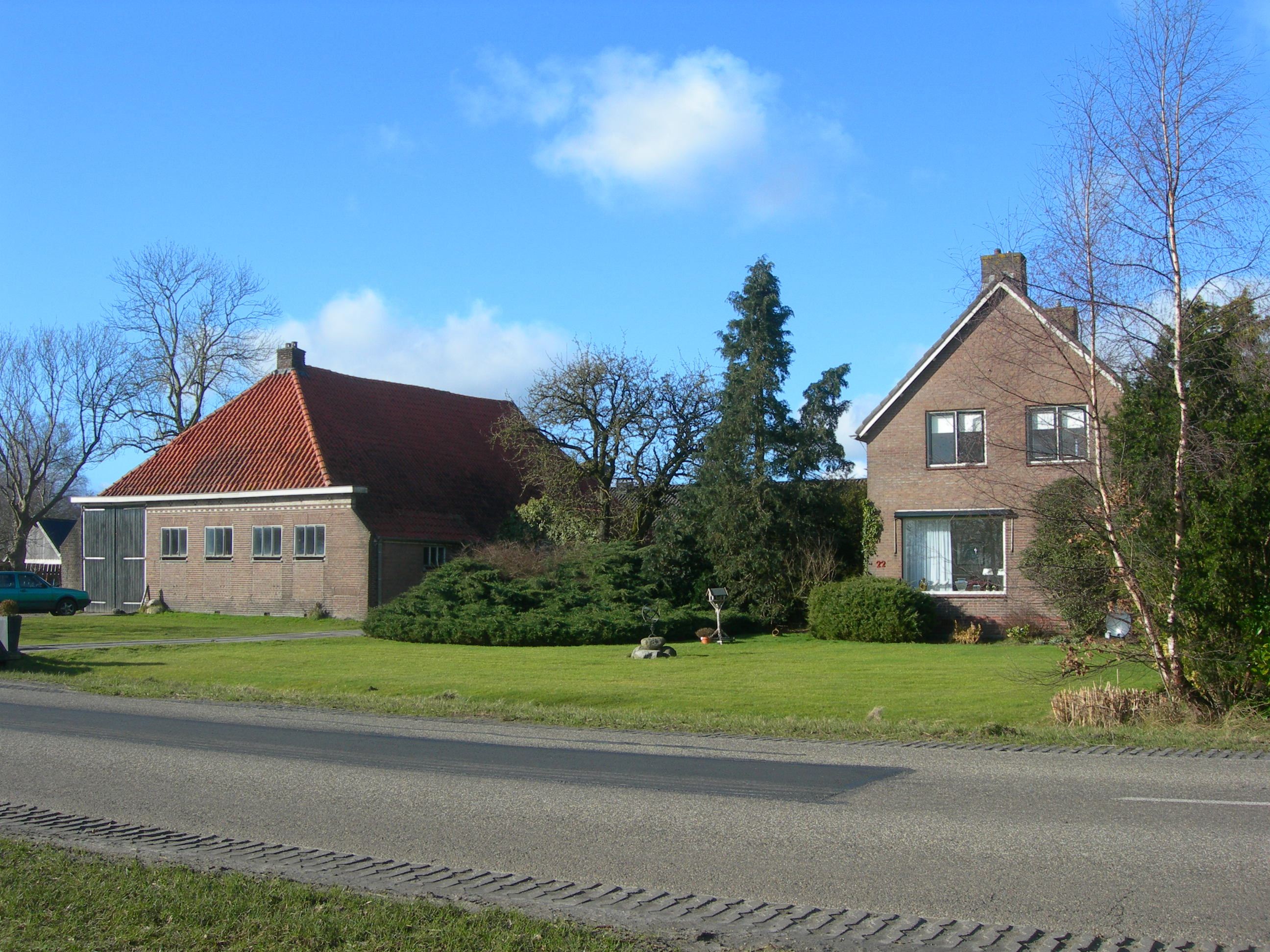
Farm in Wijnjewoude

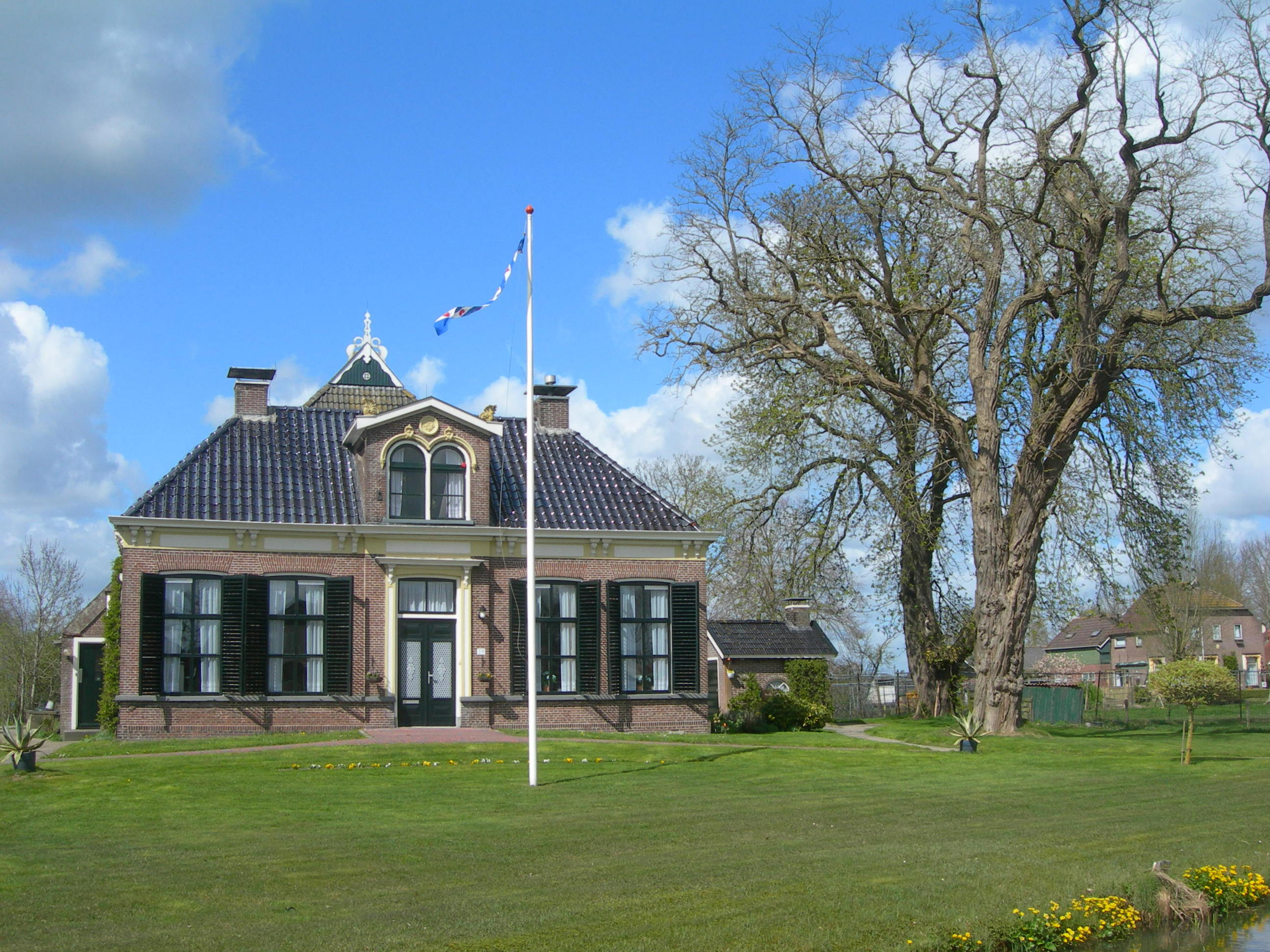
Farm in Wijnjewoude
