= Bram Moolenaar =

Dutch computer programmer (1961–2023)

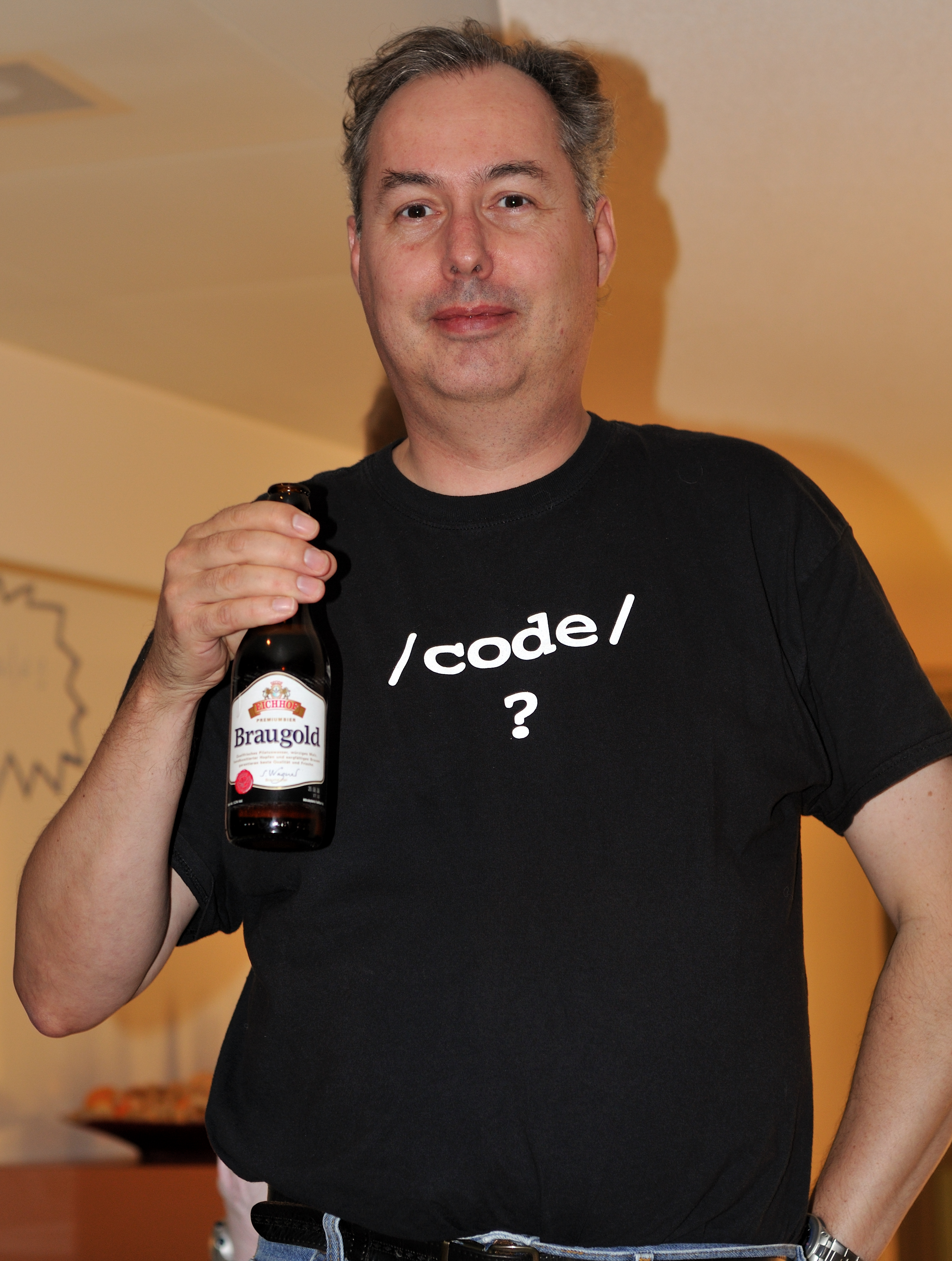
- Moolenaar in 2007
- Born: 1961; Lisse, Netherlands
- Died: 3 August 2023 (aged 62)
- Known for: Vim; ICCF Holland
- Awards: NLUUG Awards
- Website: www.moolenaar.net

Signature
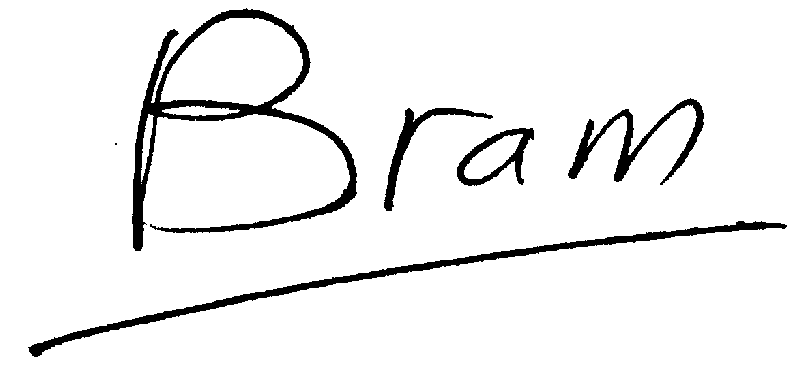

Bram Moolenaar (Dutch: [brɑ‿ˈmoːlənaːr]; 1961 – 3 August 2023) was a Dutch software engineer and activist who was the creator, maintainer, and benevolent dictator for life of Vim, a vi-derivative text editor. He advocated for ICCF Holland, a non-governmental organization supporting AIDS victims in Uganda, and used the popularity of Vim to encourage donations.

From July 2006 until September 2021, Moolenaar was employed by Google, working in the Zürich office on Google Calendar. He spent part of his time maintaining Vim.

== Early life and education ==
Moolenaar was born in Lisse, Netherlands, in 1961. In 1985, he graduated from the Delft University of Technology with a degree in electrical engineering.

== Vim ==
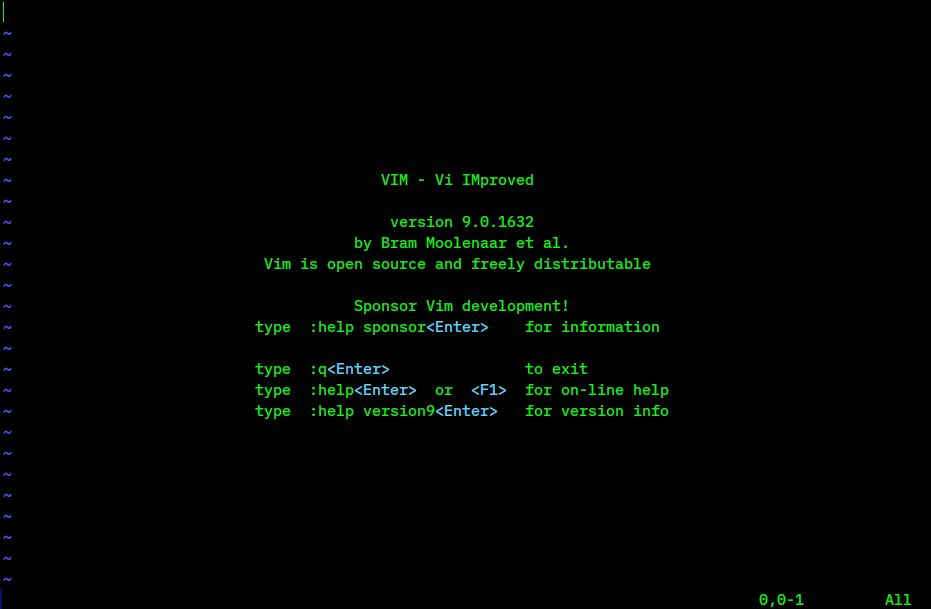
The opening screen of Vim

In 1988, Moolenaar purchased an Amiga computer. Familiar with vi, which had not been ported to the Amiga at the time, he tested several clones of vi, including Stevie. Moolenaar took the source code of Stevie and improved upon it. Seeking to match vi, Moolenaar eventually added in additional features, such as undoing multiple levels. The first version of "Vi IMitation" was released in 1992 on a public domain disk set made by Fred Fish. Several users ported Vim onto other platforms, such as MS-DOS and Unix. In version 1.22 in 1992, Vi IMitation was renamed to "Vi IMproved".

Vim is open-source and charityware; users are encouraged to donate to ICCF Holland. A number of other applications have been licensed this way since Vim's inception. Vim has won several awards and has been referred to as one of the most popular text editors.

== Other ventures ==
Other software tools that Moolenaar developed include a software build tool written in Python, called A-A-P, which is similar to make, and a programming language called Zimbu which puts an emphasis on readability of programs.

Moolenaar was a member of the Dutch Unix user group, NLUUG, which presented him with an award during its 25th anniversary, for his creation of Vim and his contributions to open-source software in general.

=== Charity ===
Moolenaar was an advocate of ICCF Holland, a non-governmental organization based in Kibaale, Uganda which he founded to support children whose parents have died of AIDS. In 1994, he volunteered as a water and sanitation engineer for the Kibaale Children's Centre; he made several return trips over the following twenty-five years. In 1995, he made Vim charityware. An estimated US$2,000 was raised for ICCF Holland in 1997, followed by US$4,000 a year later. In 1999, donation income totaled approximately US$7,000. He last visited the Kibaale Community Centre in 2020 before the COVID-19 pandemic. Following Bram's passing in 2023, ICCF Holland transferred all activities to its sister charity Kuwasha in Canada and dissolved at the end of 2025.

== Illness and death ==
Moolenaar reported health problems in October 2022. On 5 August 2023, Moolenaar's family announced in the Vim Google Group that Moolenaar had died two days prior, at the age of 62, because of a rapidly developing medical condition. His funeral was held in Lisse, Netherlands, on 16 August 2023. Vim was continued by co-contributor Christian Brabandt.

== Posthumous fame ==
Bram Moolenaar was posthumously awarded the 2024 European SFS Award at SFSCON 24, a free software meeting organised since 2004 by the Free Software Foundation Europe (FSFE) and the Linux User Group Bolzano-Bozen (LUGBZ).
