= Rob Blokzijl =

Dutch physicist and computer scientist

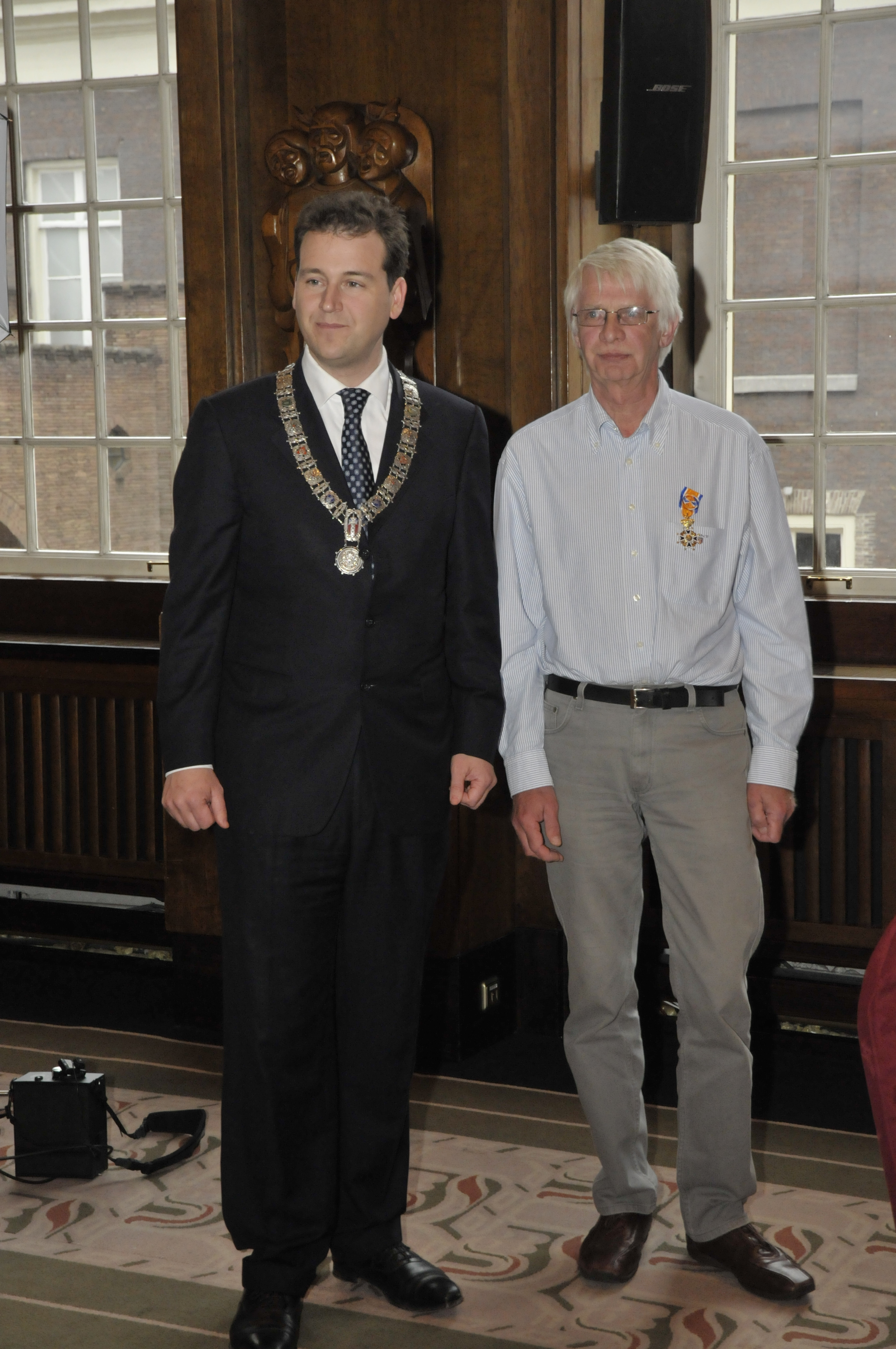
- Acting Mayor Lodewijk Asscher (left) and Rob Blokzijl at the awarding of Officer in the Order of Orange-Nassau.
- Born: 21 October 1943; Amsterdam, Netherlands
- Died: 1 December 2015 (aged 72); Roggel, Netherlands
- Education: University of Amsterdam
- Known for: founding member of RIPE

Robert "Rob" Blokzijl (21 October 1943 – 1 December 2015) was a Dutch physicist and computer scientist at the National Institute for Subatomic Physics (NIKHEF), and an early internet pioneer. He was founding member and chairman of RIPE, the Réseaux IP Européens (French translation of: Europeans IP Networks), the European Internet Registrar organisation.

== Life and work ==
Born in Amsterdam, Blokzijl graduated from the University of Amsterdam in 1970, and received a doctorate in experimental physics from the same university in 1977.

Blokzijl had been active in building networks for the particle physics community in Europe. He was founding member and chairman of NIKHEF, the National Institute for Nuclear and High energy physics in the Netherlands. At the Réseaux IP Européens (RIPE), the European open forum for IP networking, he was spokesperson at its foundation in 1989 and later chaired this forum. He was also instrumental in the creation of the Réseaux IP Européens Network Coordination Centre (RIPE NCC) in 1992 as the first regional Internet registry (RIR) in the world. In 1999 he also was selected for the ICANN Board by the Address Supporting Organization, where he served until December 2002. In 2013 Blokzijl announced his resignation as chairman of RIPE, as per RIPE 68, after being in this position for 25 years. He appointed Hans Petter Holen as his successor.

In 2010 Blokzijl was awarded Officer in the Order of Orange-Nassau. He received this Royal Honour from Lodewijk Asscher, the Acting Mayor of Amsterdam. At the 93rd IETF meeting in 2015, Blokzijl was awarded the ISOC Jonathan B. Postel Service Award.

He died on 1 December 2015, aged 72.

On 1 December 2016, the RIPE NCC established the Rob Blokzijl Foundation to honour Rob's legacy by recognising and rewarding individuals who make substantial contributions to the development of the internet in the RIPE NCC service region.
