= .ru =

Latin alphabet top-level Internet domain for Russia

- Introduced: 7 April 1994; 32 years ago
- TLD type: Country code top-level domain
- Status: Active
- Registry: Coordination Center for TLD RU
- Intended use: Entities connected with Russia
- Actual use: Very popular in Russia
- Registered domains: 5,381,137 (January 2018)
- Structure: Registrations are permitted directly at the second level; third-level registrations are also possible under the rule of the official registry
- Documents: Documents
- Dispute policies: None
- DNSSEC: yes
- Registry website: cctld.ru/en/

.ru is the Latin alphabet Internet country code top-level domain (ccTLD) for Russia introduced on 7 April 1994. The Russian alphabet internationalized country code is .рф.

Control of .ru is assigned to the Coordination Center for TLD RU (CC for TLD RU), the current official registry. On 1 January 2005, the former registry, the Russian Institute for Public Networks (RIPN), stopped new registrations directly under .ru, but still carried out registry operations for domain names under the second-level domains .com.ru, .net.ru, .org.ru and .pp.ru.

The company RELCOM also proposes third-level registrations beneath various second-level domains such as .msk.ru (Moscow), while Macomnet Telcom proposes third-level registrations beneath .int.ru simultaneously.

== Background ==
The creation of .ru in April 1994 was preceded by a historical agreement in 1993 known as "The order of RU top-level domain administration". According to the agreement, administrative and technical support responsibilities for the .ru domain were to be handed over to RIPN. In 2002, the administrative functions were handed over to CC for TLD RU.

== Development of .ru ==
The ccTLD is developing rapidly under self-regulation. In 1993, an informal union was formed, known as the RU Top-Level Domain Coordination Group (RU TLD CG). The union includes the leading Russian Internet service providers as well as scientific and educational networks entrusted by RIPN with RU domain administration.

In 1998, RIPN and RU TLD CG established a domain registration association. Subsequently, in 2000, a new system of domain name registration for .ru was introduced. It was a distributed system of second-level domain name registrations in .ru, through accredited registrars. The accredited registrars provide domain name registration and support services on a "first come, first served" basis to end-users.

RIPN became one of four co-founders of CC for TLD RU, but continued to support centralized technical aspects of the operation of .ru. All organizational and administrative functions were handed over to CC for TLD RU. To preserve historical continuity, one of CC for TLD RU's committees was established on the basis of RU TLD CG.

CC for TLD RU maintains domain name registration rules for .ru, the registrar accreditation procedure, and promotes perspective projects that involve the growth of .ru, whereas RIPN secures .ru technical base functions and supports DNS for the .ru DNS zone.

The current distributed registration system was first tested in 2001 and implemented in 2005.

More than 5 million 895 thousand domains are registered in the .RU domain zone. Registration is carried out by 136 accredited registrars. The domain market is significantly monopolized — more than 2/3 is accounted for by 2 registrars with one owner.

== Second-level domains ==
Although direct registration of second-level domains is widespread, there are a number of second-level domains designated for third-level domain name registrations depending on organizational type and geographic location. The full list is published on the CC for TLD RU website.

=== Generic second-level domains ===
- .ac.ru — scientific institutions and higher education
- .com.ru — commercial organizations
- .edu.ru — education
- .gov.ru — Russia's federal government
- .int.ru — international organizations
- .mil.ru — the Russian military
- .net.ru — organizations having to do with the Internet
- .org.ru — noncommercial organizations
- .pp.ru — individuals

=== Second-level domains for federal subjects of Russia ===
Some federal subjects have multiple second-level domains, and others (not listed below) have none.

- .adygeya.ru — Adygea
- .bashkiria.ru — Bashkortostan
- .buryatia.ru, .ulan-ude.ru — Buryatia
- .grozny.ru — Chechnya
- .cap.ru — Chuvashia
- .dagestan.ru — Dagestan
- .nalchik.ru — Kabardino-Balkaria
- .kalmykia.ru — Kalmykia
- .kchr.ru — Karachay–Cherkessia
- .karelia.ru, .ptz.ru — Republic of Karelia
- .khakassia.ru — Khakassia
- .komi.ru — Komi Republic
- .mari-el.ru, mari.ru, .joshkar-ola.ru — Mari El
- .mordovia.ru — Mordovia
- .yakutia.ru — Sakha Republic
- .vladikavkaz.ru — North Ossetia–Alania
- .kazan.ru, .tatarstan.ru — Tatarstan
- .tuva.ru — Tuva
- .izhevsk.ru, .udmurtia.ru, .udm.ru — Udmurtia
- .altai.ru — Altai Krai
- .kamchatka.ru — Kamchatka Krai (.palana.ru was used by Koryak Autonomous Okrug before it was merged into Kamchatka Krai)
- .khabarovsk.ru, .khv.ru — Khabarovsk Krai
- .kuban.ru — Krasnodar Krai
- .krasnoyarsk.ru — Krasnoyarsk Krai
- .perm.ru — Perm Krai
- .marine.ru, .vladivostok.ru — Primorsky Krai
- .stavropol.ru, .stv.ru — Stavropol Krai
- .chita.ru — Zabaykalsky Krai
- .amur.ru — Amur Oblast
- .arkhangelsk.ru — Arkhangelsk Oblast
- .astrakhan.ru — Astrakhan Oblast
- .belgorod.ru — Belgorod Oblast
- .bryansk.ru — Bryansk Oblast
- .chelyabinsk.ru, .chel.ru — Chelyabinsk Oblast
- .ivanovo.ru — Ivanovo Oblast
- .irkutsk.ru — Irkutsk Oblast
- .koenig.ru — Kaliningrad Oblast
- .kaluga.ru — Kaluga Oblast
- .kemerovo.ru — Kemerovo Oblast
- .kirov.ru, .vyatka.ru — Kirov Oblast
- .kostroma.ru — Kostroma Oblast
- .kurgan.ru — Kurgan Oblast
- .kursk.ru — Kursk Oblast
- .lipetsk.ru — Lipetsk Oblast
- .magadan.ru — Magadan Oblast
- .mosreg.ru — Moscow Oblast
- .murmansk.ru — Murmansk Oblast
- .nnov.ru — Nizhny Novgorod Oblast
- .nov.ru — Novgorod Oblast
- .novosibirsk.ru, .nsk.ru — Novosibirsk Oblast
- .omsk.ru — Omsk Oblast
- .orenburg.ru — Orenburg Oblast
- .oryol.ru — Oryol Oblast
- .penza.ru — Penza Oblast
- .pskov.ru — Pskov Oblast
- .rnd.ru — Rostov Oblast
- .ryazan.ru — Ryazan Oblast
- .samara.ru — Samara Oblast
- .saratov.ru — Saratov Oblast
- .sakhalin.ru, .yuzhno-sakhalinsk.ru — Sakhalin Oblast
- .e-burg.ru, .yekaterinburg.ru — Sverdlovsk Oblast
- .smolensk.ru — Smolensk Oblast
- .tambov.ru — Tambov Oblast
- .tver.ru — Tver Oblast
- .tomsk.ru, .tom.ru, .tsk.ru — Tomsk Oblast
- .tula.ru — Tula Oblast
- .tyumen.ru — Tyumen Oblast
- .simbirsk.ru — Ulyanovsk Oblast
- .vladimir.ru — Vladimir Oblast
- .volgograd.ru, .tsaritsyn.ru — Volgograd Oblast
- .vologda.ru — Vologda Oblast
- .cbg.ru, .voronezh.ru, .vrn.ru — Voronezh Oblast
- .yaroslavl.ru — Yaroslavl Oblast
- .mos.ru, .msk.ru — Moscow
- .spb.ru — Saint Petersburg
- .bir.ru, .jar.ru — Jewish Autonomous Oblast
- .chukotka.ru — Chukotka Autonomous Okrug
- .surgut.ru — Khanty–Mansi Autonomous Okrug
- .yamal.ru — Yamalo-Nenets Autonomous Okrug

=== Other geographic second-level domains ===
These were created before rules were established for geographic second-level domain names in .ru, and have had to be grandfathered in.

- .amursk.ru — Amursk
- .baikal.ru — Lake Baikal region
- .cmw.ru — Kislovodsk, Pyatigorsk, Yessentuki, Zheleznovodsk
- .fareast.ru — the Russian Far East
- .jamal.ru — Yamal Peninsula
- .kms.ru — Komsomolsk-na-Amure
- .k-uralsk.ru — Kamensk-Uralsky
- .kustanai.ru — Kustanai
- .kuzbass.ru — the Kuznetsk Basin
- .magnitka.ru — Magnitogorsk
- .mytis.ru — Mytischi
- .nakhodka.ru — Nakhodka
- .nkz.ru — Novokuznetsk
- .norilsk.ru — Norilsk
- .snz.ru — Snezhinsk
- .oskol.ru — Stary Oskol
- .pyatigorsk.ru — Pyatigorsk
- .rubtsovsk.ru — Rubtsovsk
- .syzran.ru — Syzran
- .tlt.ru — Tolyatti
- .vdonsk.ru — Volgodonsk

In addition, the .test.ru second-level domain is reserved for use in examples in documentation.

== See also ==
- Internet in Russia
- .su
- Technical Center of Internet
