= XLINK (Internet service provider) =

XLINK (originally the Externe Lokale Informatik-Netz Karlsruhe), was the external connection of the computer science network of the universities in Karlsruhe, Germany), subsequently becoming part of the first commercial Internet service provider (ISP) in Germany.

== History ==
It was created in 1984, when it offered one of the first UUCP connections from Germany to the United States (via UUNET), and from November 1989 it also offered Internet connectivity mainly to universities in the south of Germany.

XLINK was one of the founding members of RIPE and of DENIC; its autonomous system number (autnum) was AS517.

It was transformed into (part of) a company in 1993, and as such, competed with the UniDO ISP (incorporated as EUnet Germany) for the title of first commercial ISP in Germany.

It was bought by Qwest in 1999 and contributed to and renamed to KPNQwest Germany in May 2000, which went bankrupt in the Internet bubble crash of 2002. Remnants exist in KPN Eurorings.
