= FireFTP =

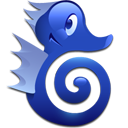

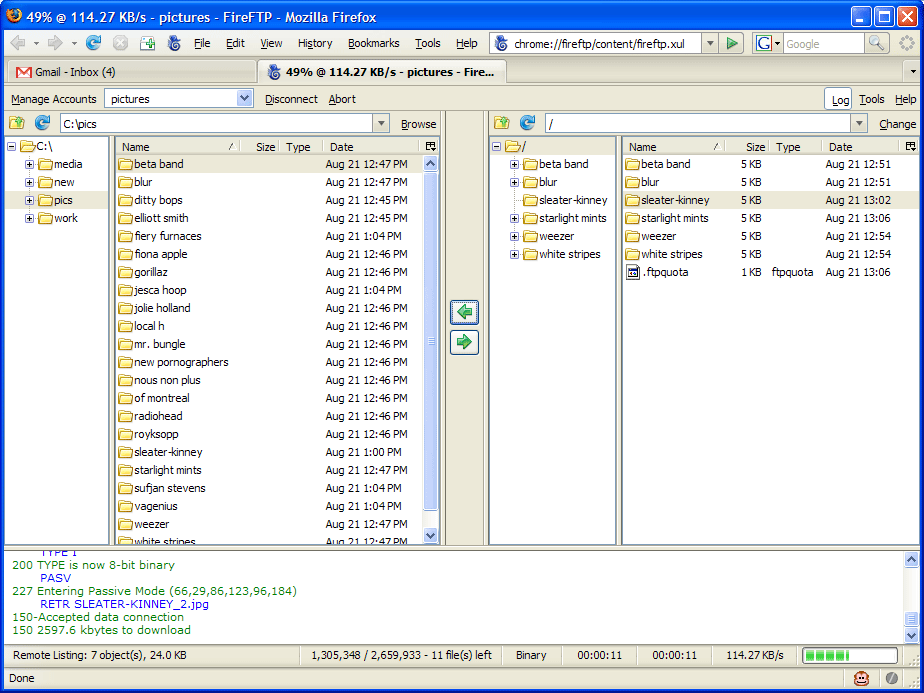
- FireFTP 0.97.1
- Developer: Mime Čuvalo
- Initial release: September 2004
- Stable release: 2.0.32 / 1 February 2019
- Preview release: none [±]
- Written in: JavaScript/XUL
- Operating system: Cross-platform
- Available in: Multilingual
- Type: FTP client
- License: Free software (MPL 1.1)
- Website: fireftp.net
- Repository: github.com/mimecuvalo/fireftp

FireFTP is a discontinued free, open-source, cross-platform FTP client for Mozilla Firefox in the form of an add-on. It supports FTP, FTPS, and SFTP. FireFTP was developed by Mime Čuvalo, a Croatian web developer who released it as charityware. It runs on any of the platforms that Firefox supports. FireFTP's layout is similar to that of WS FTP. It is no longer compatible with Firefox 57 (Quantum) and later, and the authors recommend using Waterfox instead of Firefox.

== Features ==
FireFTP is activated from the Tools menu, opening a two-pane view within a Firefox window. The pane on the left-hand side shows the local file system, a tree of directories and a list of files in the current directory. The pane on the right shows the remote FTP server. Between the panes there are two buttons with arrows, one for upload and the other for download.

To connect to an FTP server, one can either enter a site name directly ("QuickConnect") or use the Account Manager to make FireFTP remember settings about that particular site, including the username and password, security settings (encryption schemes), passive mode, initial directories to change to upon connection, and case changes to be performed in file names after transmissions.

FireFTP supports caching directory listings, and it can also do a comparison between a local directory tree and the remote one. It can connect via proxy servers and it is able to automatically reconnect after disconnection. It can also be set to intercept all ftp:// links in Firefox (making them open within FireFTP).

As of 0.95, FireFTP offers the functionality to keep upload/download timestamps in sync. However, the local timestamp is modified instead of the remote one. Since version 2.0.24 it is possible to transfer files larger than 2 GB.
