= CAcert.org =

Certificate authority

CAcert Inc.
- Type: Nonprofit organization
- Industry: Certificate authority
- Founded: 24 July 2003
- Founder: Duane Groth
- Headquarters: Geneva, Switzerland
- Area served: World
- Website: www.cacert.org

CAcert.org is a community-driven certificate authority that issues free X.509 public key certificates. CAcert.org relies heavily on automation and therefore issues only Domain-validated certificates (and not Extended validation or Organization Validation certificates).

These certificates can be used to digitally sign and encrypt email; encrypt code and documents; and to authenticate and authorize user connections to websites via TLS/SSL.

== CAcert Inc. Association ==
On 24 July 2003, Duane Groth incorporated CAcert Inc. as a non-profit association registered in New South Wales, Australia and after, in September 2024, moved to Europe in Geneva, Switzerland. CAcert Inc runs CAcert.org—a community-driven certificate authority.

In 2004, the Dutch Internet pioneer Teus Hagen became involved. He served as board member and, in 2008, as a president.

== Certificate Trust status ==
CAcert.org's root certificates are not included in the most widely deployed certificate stores and has to be added by its customers. As of 2021, most browsers, email clients, and operating systems do not automatically trust certificates issued by CAcert. Thus, users receive an "untrusted certificate" warning upon trying to view a website providing X.509 certificate issued by CAcert, or view emails authenticated with CAcert certificates in Microsoft Outlook, Mozilla Thunderbird, etc. CAcert uses its own certificate on its website.

=== Web browsers ===
Discussion for inclusion of CAcert root certificate in Mozilla Application Suite and Mozilla Firefox started in 2004. Mozilla had no CA certificate policy at the time. Eventually, Mozilla developed a policy which required CAcert to improve their management system and conduct audits. In April 2007, CAcert formally withdrew its application for inclusion in the Mozilla root program. At the same time, the CA/Browser Forum was established to facilitate communication among browser vendors and Certificate Authorities. Mozilla's advice was incorporated into "baseline requirements" used by most major browser vendors. Progress towards meeting these requirements can hardly be expected in the near future.

=== Operating systems ===
FreeBSD included CAcert's root certificate but removed it in 2008, following Mozilla's policy. In 2014, CAcert was removed from Ubuntu, Debian, and OpenBSD root stores. In 2018, CAcert was removed from Arch Linux.

As of Feb 2022, the following operating systems or distributions include the CAcert root certificate by default:

- FreeWRT
- GRML
- Knoppix
- Mandriva Linux
- MirOS BSD
- Openfire
- Privatix
- Replicant (Android)

As of 2021, the following operating systems or distributions have an optional package with the CAcert root certificate:

- Arch Linux
- Debian
- Gentoo (app-misc/ca-certificates only when USE flag cacert is set, defaults OFF from version 20161102.3.27.2-r2 )
- openSUSE

== Web of trust ==
To create higher-trust certificates, users can participate in a web of trust system whereby users physically meet and verify each other's identities. CAcert maintains the number of assurance points for each account. Assurance points can be gained through various means, primarily by having one's identity physically verified by users classified as "Assurers".

Having more assurance points allows users more privileges such as writing a name in the certificate and longer expiration times on certificates. A user with at least 100 assurance points is a Prospective Assurer, and may—after passing an Assurer Challenge—verify other users; more assurance points allow the Assurer to assign more assurance points to others.

CAcert sponsors key signing parties, especially at big events such as CeBIT and FOSDEM.

As of 2021, CAcert's web of trust has over 380,000 verified users.

== Root certificate descriptions ==
Since October 2005, CAcert offers Class 1 and Class 3 root certificates. Class 3 is a high-security subset of Class 1.

== See also ==
- Let's Encrypt
- CAcert wiki
