= Moscow Internet Exchange =

Internet exchange point in Russia

MSK-IX
- Full name: MSK-IX
- Founded: 1995
- Website: www.msk-ix.ru/en/
- Members: 549
- Peak: 7.7 Tbps (February 2025)
- Daily (avg.): 5.68 Tbps

MSK-IX (Moscow Internet eXchange) is an Internet eXchange Point (IXP) with headquarters in Moscow, Russia. With over 549 connected networks and 7,7 Tbps of peak traffic (February 2025), MSK-IX is one of the world's largest IXPs. According to the Internet Exchange Report by Hurricane Electric Internet Services, MSK-IX is the largest IXP in Russia and 17th largest in the world by the numbers of members.

MSK-IX operates Internet eXchanges (IXes) in 9 cities: Moscow, St. Petersburg, Rostov-on-Don, Stavropol, Samara, Kazan, Ekaterinburg, Novosibirsk, Vladivostok and maintains an access PoP in Riga (Latvia). MSK-IX operates a distributed DNS platform, which provides authoritative name servers for the country-code top-level domains (ccTLDs) .RU and .РФ for Russia. Also it operates alternative DNS root servers of Russian National Domain Name System for Roskomnadzor due to (Sovereign Internet Law).

== History ==
MSK-IX was founded in 1995 pursuant to the treaty signed by 6 Russian ISPs willing to reduce IP-traffic latency and international backhaul costs. The treaty assigned the Russian Institute for Public Networks (RIPN) as the administrator of the forthcoming IP-traffic exchange and defined technical requirements for connecting ISPs. The first MSK-IX PoP was established by RIPN at M9 facility on Butlerova st., 7. In 2001, MSK-IX became an autonomous organization. In 2002, MSK-IX joined Euro-IX, an international association of IXPs. State-run telecommunications company Rostelecom have acquired the majority of MSK-IX stock in 2015.

== Technical platform ==
MSK-IX operates a distributed Ethernet-based switching platform spanning 38 PoPs in 10 cities. After the introduction of the "Dual Core" topology in Moscow in 2015, the total capacity of MSK-IX reached 8 Tbps.

MSK-IX maintains a dedicated public peering VLAN at each of 9 metro areas and supports arbitrary private VLANs. Inter-city connections are provided on-net by MSK-IX and via partner ISPs. Common interface speeds are 1, 10 and 100G. The route-servers provided at each of MSK-IX public peering VLANs allow for routing policy control and DDoS blackholing by use of BGP communities.

The MSK-IX DNS Cloud is a distributed anycast DNS platform located in 7 federal districts of Russia, in Europe and in the Americas. It provides authoritative name servers for the country-code top-level domains (ccTLDs) .RU, .РФ, .ДЕТИ, .TATAR and .SU. for Russia and alternative DNS root servers of Russian National Domain Name System for Roskomnadzor due to (Sovereign Internet Law).

In Moscow, MSK-IX operates M9.PLUS colocation space of 200 racks located at M9 (Butlerova st., 7).

== Professional community support ==
MSK-IX is a regular host and organizer of events for telecoms community.

On the occasion of its 10th anniversary in 2005, MSK-IX held its first Technical seminar. Reincarnated a year later as "MSK-IX Peering Forum", the event became a regular gathering of 500+ telecom professionals in Moscow with an agenda focused on network operations, security and peering.

In 2011, MSK-IX supported RIPE NCC in launching the ENOG (Eurasia Network Operators Group) conferences. As of October 2017, MSK-IX sponsored 6 and was serving as local host for 5 ENOG events.

== See also ==
- List of Internet exchange points by size
