= ICCF Holland =

HIV/AIDS charity based in the Netherlands

ICCF Holland logo

The International Child Care Fund Holland (ICCF Holland) was a small non-governmental organization that supported a project in Kibaale, a small town in the south of Uganda. The project aimed at helping AIDS victims. The organization was dissolved at the end of 2025.

== Organization ==
In this poor area of Africa, many adults are infected with HIV. When they die, their children are left behind. The project provided these children with the support they needed to survive. Education was provided at various levels; nursery, primary, secondary, and vocational. It also operated a clinic, which provided the only affordable medical care in the area.

Stichting ICCF Holland was registered in Venlo, the Netherlands. All the work was done by volunteers, which made it possible to send 99% of the donated money to the project. Donors could sponsor a child or make a one-time donation.

Bram Moolenaar, the author of the text editor Vim, founded ICCF Holland and served as its treasurer until his death in 2023. Following Moolenaar's death, the organization's small team of two volunteers decided to dissolve the foundation and transfer its activities and sponsorships to its sister charity, Kuwasha. The dissolution was finalized by the end of 2025.

Vim is free software, released under a charityware license that encouraged users to contribute to ICCF and help children in Uganda. A message to this effect appears every time Vim is started without a file.
