= Daniel Karrenberg =

German computer scientist

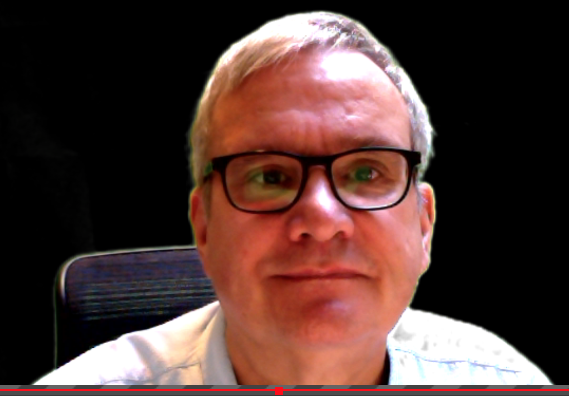

Daniel Karrenberg (born 1959, in Düsseldorf) is a German computer scientist and one of Europe's Internet pioneers who lives in the Netherlands.

== Biography ==
From 1981 to 1987, Karrenberg was a scientific assistant and network administrator at TU Dortmund. In 1982, he helped set up EUnet, the first European Internet service provider.

From 1987 to 1992, Karrenberg worked at the Centrum Wiskunde & Informatica (CWI) in Amsterdam, where he helped to build the central European structured cabling with links to the American NSFNET.

In 1989, Karrenberg was one of the founders of RIPE, the platform for cooperation between European internet providers. In 1992, he was instrumental in founding the world's first Regional Internet Registry, the RIPE NCC, responsible for Europe, the Middle East and parts of Africa and Central Asia, which he headed until 1999.

From 2000, Karrenberg was the lead scientist at RIPE NCC, leading operational activities in numerous projects including RIPE Routing Information Service (RIS), RIPE Test Traffic Measurements (TTM), DNS Monitoring Service (DNSMON), and Name Server Daemon (NSD).

From 2005 to 2011, Karrenberg was a member of the Board of Trustees of the Internet Society, of which he chaired for three years.

== Awards ==
In 2001, Karrenberg received the Jonathan B. Postel Service Award for Two Decades Of Extraordinary Dedication To The Development Of Networking In Europe And Around The World. In 2012, he was inducted into the Internet Hall of Fame in the Global Connectors category.
