= Vadim Antonov =

Russian-American software engineer and entrepreneur

- Born: May 25, 1965 (age 60)
- Occupation: Software engineer / Entrepreneur

Vadim Antonov (Russian: Антонов Вадим Геннадьевич) born May 25, 1965, is a Russian-American software engineer and entrepreneur. He is known for his work on operating systems, Internet backbone networks, network router hardware, computer security, and data warehouses. He is also known for his role in organizing civil resistance to 1991 Soviet coup d'état attempt notable for pioneering the use of Internet to effect the political change.

== Soviet coup d'etat attempt ==
During 1991 Soviet hardline Communist coup d'état attempt Vadim Antonov and his colleagues at RELCOM used their network facilities to gather and disseminate independent information about the current situation in the country, thus undermining the censorship in mass media ordered by the coup plotters. As a co-founder of RELCOM, Vadim Antonov was well known to the users of the network, which gave him credibility to act as the moderator for the stream of situation reports during the crisis; he anonymized the reports to protect the sources in case if the coup succeeded. In an interview to PBS Mr. Antonov explained that providing the alternative to the official narrative was necessary to discourage the regional government officials from joining the coup leaders.
