= Russian Institute for Public Networks =

Networking development organization

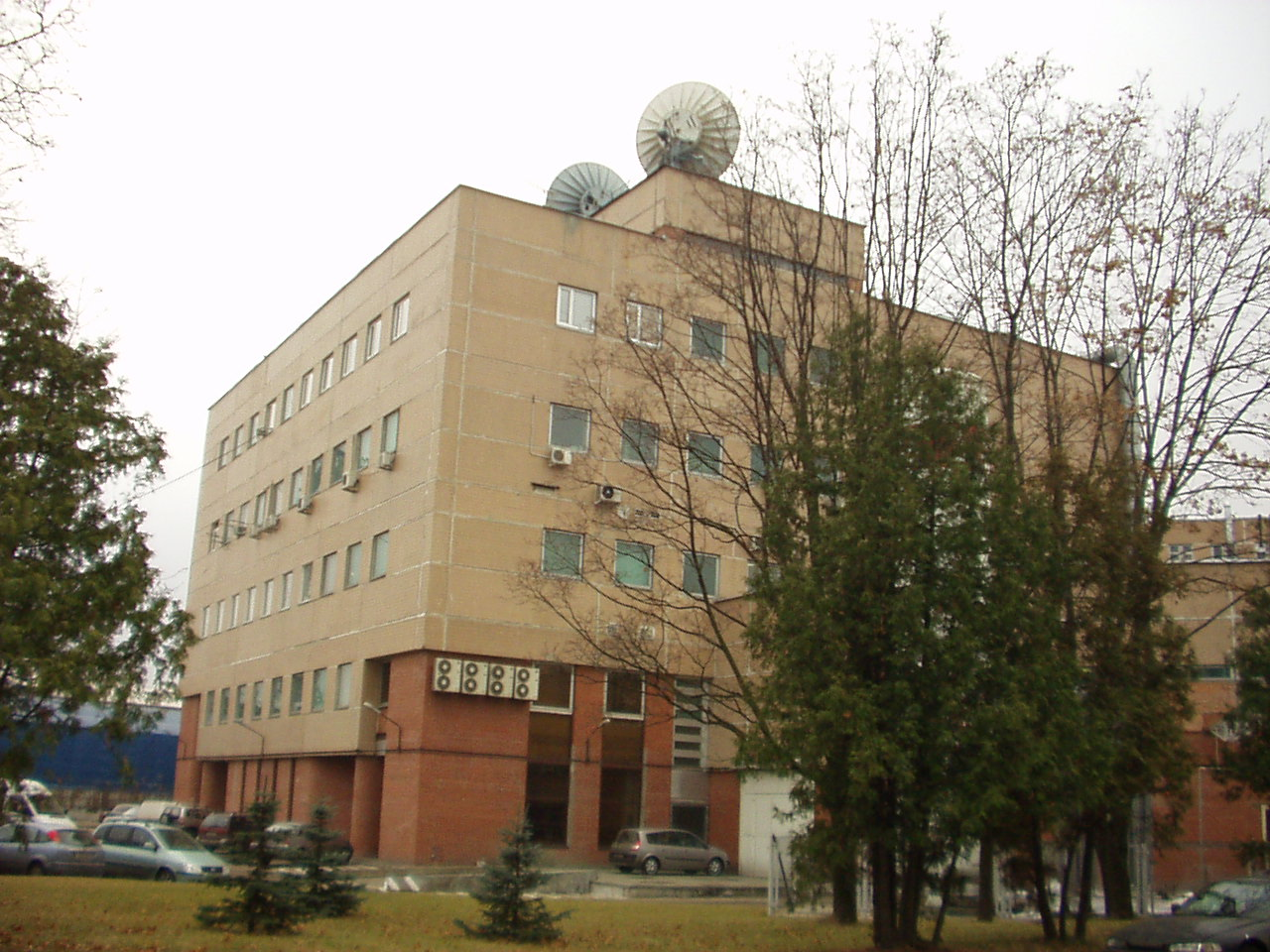
- RIPN building at KIAE
- Formation: 1992
- Website: https://ripn.su/

The Russian Research Institute for the Development of Public Networks (RIPN; Russian: РосНИИРОС; Российский научно-исследовательский институт развития общественных сетей) is a Russian institution that operates in two main areas:

- the development of computer networks for organizations of science and education,
- development of basic elements of the infrastructure of the Russian segment of the Internet.

== History ==
The institution was created by the State Committee of the RSFSR for Science and Higher Education, the Institute of Atomic Energy (IAE). IV Kurchatov and the Information and Computing Center of the IAE them. IV Kurchatov in 1992 and registered as a non-profit organization.

Until 2001, it was the only registrar of .ru domain names. In 2000, after the beginning of the creation in the zone .ru of the distributed domain name registration system, established the registrar RU-NIC (RU-CENTER) and from 2001 ceased signing new domain registration contracts. Earlier signed agreements on registration and support of domains operated until January 1, 2005, and to continue the maintenance of domains, the owners had to transfer them to one of the accredited domain name registrars without fail.

In 2004 the non-profit organization became autonomous, having transformed from the Institution "Russian Research Institute for the Development of Public Networks" to the Autonomous Nonprofit Organization "Russian Research Institute for the Development of Public Networks" (ANO "RIPN").

== Projects of RIPN ==
- RIPN is the operator of the inter-departmental Russian backbone network (Russian Backbone Network, RBNet), which provides connection to the Internet of regional scientific and educational networks. Regional networks are connected through the RBNet network nodes located in all the Federal Districts of Russia (usually 1-2 nodes per district). The main elements of the RBNet network were laid during the implementation of the Interdepartmental Program "Creation of a national network of computer telecommunications for science and higher education" in 1995–2001.
- RIPN develops and supports the Technical Center of the Russian national top-level domain .ru, including the Registry of second-level domains in the .ru domain, registration systems and DNS. A total of about 2.5 million second-level domains are registered in the .ru domain (as of November 2009).
- RIPN has become the founder of Internet traffic exchange points in Moscow (MSK-IX), St. Petersburg, Rostov-on-Don, Samara, Yekaterinburg, Novosibirsk and Vladivostok. Since 2013, the management of MSK-IX and regional traffic exchange points has been consolidated into JSC "Center for Interaction of Computer Networks" MSK-IX. RIPN retains its strategic participation in the project through a 100% subsidiary of ANO "CVKS" MSK-IX.
- RIPN actively cooperates with the Association of Scientific and Educational Organizations - users of electronic data networks - RELARN, provides for the association RELARN a non-profit scientific and educational network RELARN-IP, covering, in the main, the organizations of Moscow and the Moscow region.

=== Free Domain Registration ===
Until December 27, 2010, RIPN managed a number of public and geographical domains intended for registration of third-level subdomains.

Among these domains were:

- .com.ru - recommended for projects of a commercial nature (from August 2005 to October 2011 registration was not carried out);
- .net.ru - recommended for projects related to the development of the Internet;
- .org.ru - recommended for non-commercial projects;
- .pp.ru - recommended for individuals;
- .msk.ru, .spb.ru, etc. - Recommended for projects geographically linked to Moscow, St. Petersburg and a number of other cities and regions.

Subdomains ("third-level domains", that is, type name.domain.ru) were registered free of charge in accordance with the rules of using the corresponding public domain. Domains were registered using a web form for domain registration.

Since December 27, the institute has been transferring all administrated third-level domains to RU-CENTER support. Domains are registered through the RU-CENTER web interface, but already on a fee basis.

Since 2015, these domains are served by a single Flexireg registry, the infrastructure of which was created by RIPN. This registry provides distributed access to registrars for domain name service. Thus, it became possible to register third-level domains not only through RU-CENTER, but also through other registrars.

== See also ==
- Domain registration
- .su domain
- DEMOS (ISP)
