= .su =

Internet country-code top level domain for the Soviet Union

- Introduced: 19 September 1990
- TLD type: Country code top-level domain
- Status: Active
- Registry: Russian Institute for Public Networks (РосНИИРОС)
- Sponsor: Russian Institute for Public Networks (РосНИИРОС)
- Intended use: Entities connected with the Soviet Union
- Actual use: Entities connected with post-Soviet states
- Registered domains: 111,695 (3 February 2025)
- Registration restrictions: Passport required
- Structure: Registrations are permitted directly at the second level
- Documents: Documents
- Dispute policies: None
- DNSSEC: yes
- Registry website: ripn.su/en/

.su is an Internet country code top-level domain (ccTLD) that was designated for the Soviet Union on 19 September 1990. Even though the Soviet Union itself was dissolved 15 months later, the .su top-level domain remains in use to the present day. It is administered by the Russian Institute for Public Networks (RIPN, or RosNIIROS in Russian transcription).

== History ==
After 1989 a set of new internet domains was created in Europe, including .pl (Poland), .cs (Czechoslovakia), .yu (Yugoslavia) and .dd (East Germany). Among them, there was also a domain for the USSR – .su. Initially, before two-letter ccTLDs became standard, the Soviet Union was to receive a .ussr domain. The .su domain was proposed by the 19-year-old Finnish student Petri Ojala.

On 26 December 1991 the country was dissolved and its constituent republics gained independence, which should have caused the domain to begin a phase-out process, as happened with those of East Germany, Czechoslovakia, and Yugoslavia. Until 1994 there was no assigned top-level domain name for Russia. For this reason the country continued to use the Soviet domain. In 1994, the .ru domain was created, which was supposed to eventually replace the .su domain (domains for the republics other than Russia were created at different times in the mid-nineties). The domain was supposed to be withdrawn by ICANN, but it was kept at the request of the Russian government and Internet users.

In 2001, the managers of the domain stated that they would commence accepting new .su registrations, but it is unclear whether this action was compatible with ICANN policies. In September 2007, lobbyists stated that they had started negotiations with ICANN on retaining the domain. In March 2025, ICANN reportedly notified the operator of the domain, the Russian Institute for Development of Public Networks (ROSNIIROS), of a planned phase-out of the domain by 2030.

As of May 2026, the .su ccTLD contained over 112,000 domains.

From September 2026, Rucenter added a new mandatory identity registration requirement in response to new Russian regulation (Federal Law No. 569-FZ) signed late 2025. This affects all of Rucenter's managed domains including .ru, .su, and .рф, requiring all existing and new registrations to submit identity information to the Gosuslugi/ESIA portal, the Unified Identification and Authentication System. This verification system requires cooperation with the registrar, and many registrars had not updated their systems to permit verification for registrants, meaning that on September 1 of 2026 a large amount of .su domains will have renewals fail and the total number of domains is likely to drop.

== Usage ==
The domain was intended to be used by Soviet institutions and companies operating in the USSR. The dissolution of the Soviet Union a mere 15 months after the establishment of .su meant that the new TLD was superseded by the new country TLDs of the former Soviet republics. Despite this, .su is still in use. Most of the .su domains are registered in Russia and the United States. According to data from May 2025, there were over 111,500 registered domains with the .su TLD (there are over 5.895 million .ru domains). Some organizations with roots in the former Soviet Union also still use this TLD. The pro-Russian Ukrainian separatist Donetsk People's Republic have also registered their domain with the TLD. The .su domain, along with .ru briefly hosted white supremacist websites that had been deplatformed elsewhere, including The Daily Stormer. Following complaints from Russia's internet regulator Roskomnadzor however, such websites have been removed from both TLDs.

The domain also hosted many cybercrime activities until 2013 due to the relaxed and outdated terms of use, along with staying out of focus (2% usage comparing to the primary .ru zone). Rules for timely suspension of malicious domains have been in place since 2013 in response to the issue.

== See also ==
- .рф – Cyrillic top-level Internet domain for Russia
- .ru – Latin alphabet top-level Internet domain for Russia
- Runet – Russian-language Internet community
- Technical Center of Internet
- Nostalgia for the Soviet Union
