= Piet Beertema =

Dutch Internet pioneer

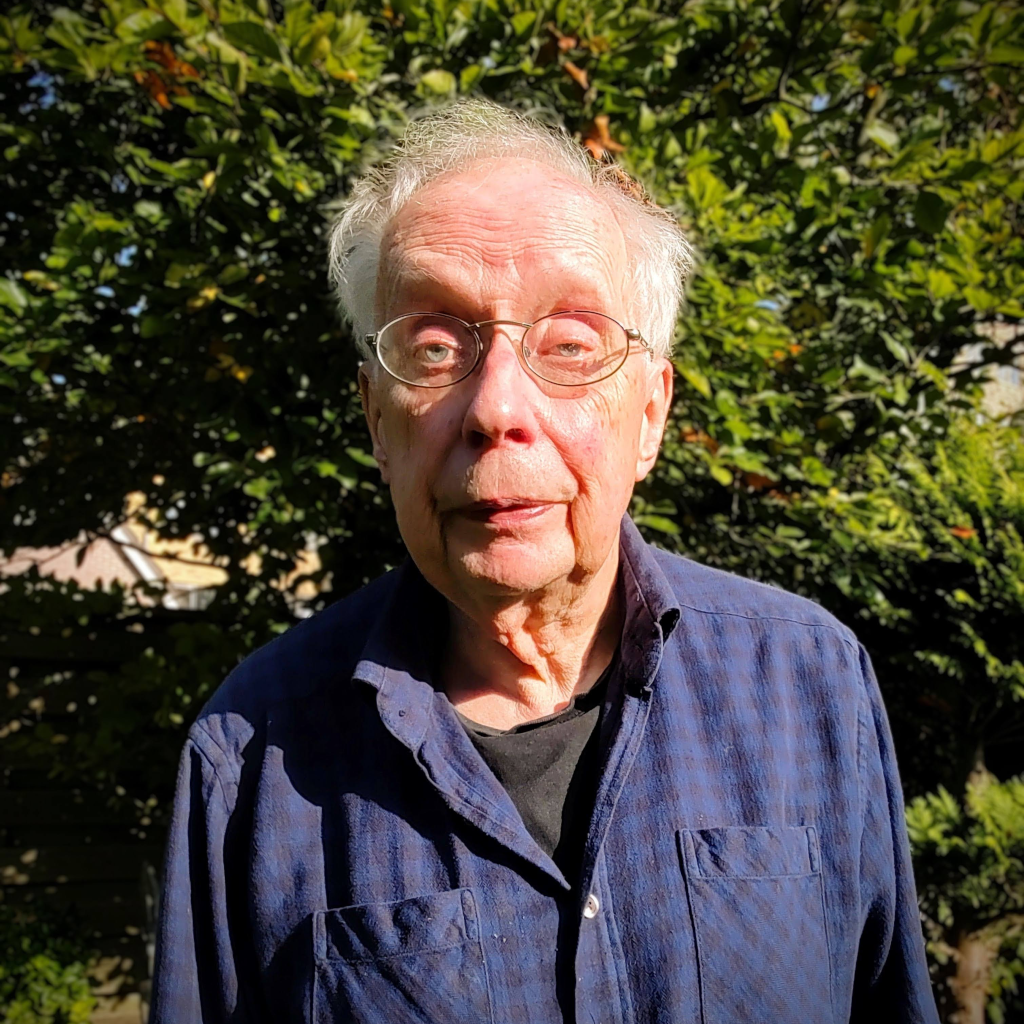
- Beertema in October 2024
- Born: 22 October 1943 (age 82); Amsterdam, Netherlands
- Scientific career
- Fields: Computer science
- Institutions: National Aerospace Laboratory (NLR); Centrum Wiskunde & Informatica (CWI)

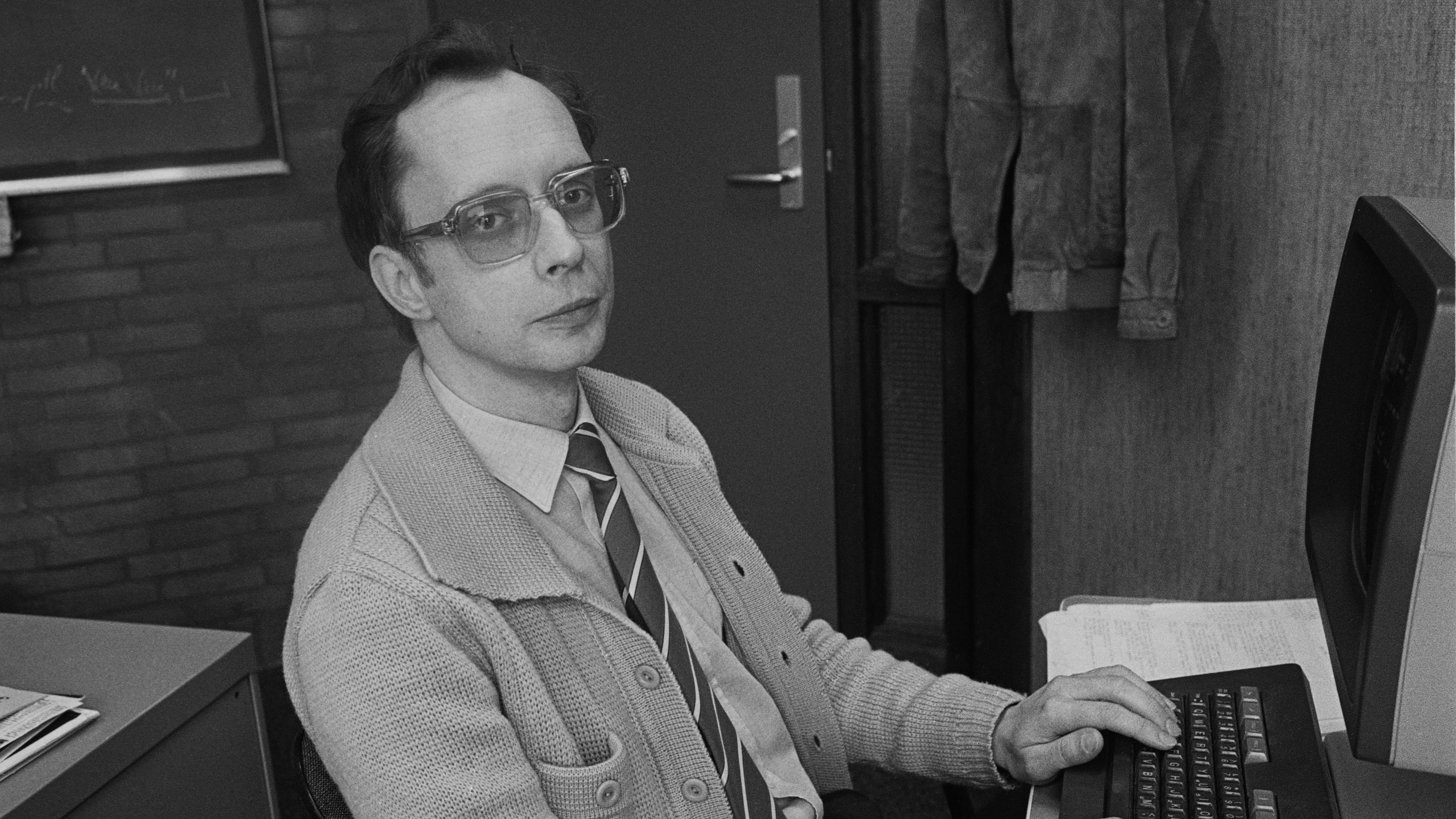
Piet Beertema at work at CWI, January 1985

Piet Beertema (born 22 October 1943 in Amsterdam) is a Dutch Internet pioneer. On November 17, 1988, at 2:28 PM, he linked the Netherlands as one of the first two countries (shortly after France's INRIA) to NSFNET, a precursor to the Internet. At that time, Beertema was working as an administrator at the Centrum Wiskunde & Informatica (CWI) in Amsterdam.

His first job was in 1965 at the Dutch National Aerospace Laboratory, where he first came into contact with a computer (an Elliott 803-B). In 1966 he joined the SMC (Stichting Mathematisch Centrum), now called the Center for Mathematics and Computer Science, where he worked until his retirement.

On April 1, 1984, Beertema created and posted to the Kremvax Usenet site posing as Konstantin Chernenko. Beertema's message greeted fellow users of Usenet on behalf of the Soviet Union and stated that one aim of them joining was to better present the views of the Soviet regime, alleging that the American administration were seeking war and world domination. The name Kremvax would subsequently be used by Vadim Antonov in 1991, when he became the first Moscovite to join usenet.

On April 25, 1986, Beertema recorded the first country code top level domain .nl and solely managed it for ten years. In 1996 he co-founded the Foundation for Internet Domain Registration Netherlands that would take over the management of the .nl domain, after doing this himself for almost 10 years.

On June 9, 1999, he received a royal decoration, Knight of the Order of the Dutch Lion. On September 16, 2004, he officially retired.

== See also ==
- Kremvax
- Donald Davies, proposed, in 1965, a commercial national data network in the United Kingdom based on packet switching
- Peter T. Kirstein, connected University College London to the ARPANET in 1973
