= RELCOM =

Early Soviet Internet

RELCOM or Relcom (Russian: РЕЛКОМ, Релком), an acronym for "RELiable COMmunications" is a computer network in Russia.

== Network ==
It was launched in the Soviet Union on August 1, 1990 in the Kurchatov Institute in collaboration with DEMOS co-operative (although the engineering team at DEMOS at the time consisted mostly of Kurchatov Institute employees, some key members (Mikhail Davidov, Vadim Antonov, Dmitry Volodin) in the RELCOM team were never employed by Kurchatov Institute).

It became one of the first Russian computer networks (and the first commercial internet service provider in the USSR) and its development led to the emergence of the Runet. Initially it was purely e-mail network based on the UUCP protocol.

During the Soviet coup attempt of 1991 the Relcom network was used to spread news about the event worldwide while the coup perpetrators were trying to suppress mass media activity through the KGB.

Now it is managed by Relcom Business Network Ltd., a Russian ISP.

== See also ==
- Kremvax
- KOI8-R
- History of the Internet in Russia
