= Aleksandr Oleinikov =

Russian director and screenwriter (1965–2026)

- Александр Олейников
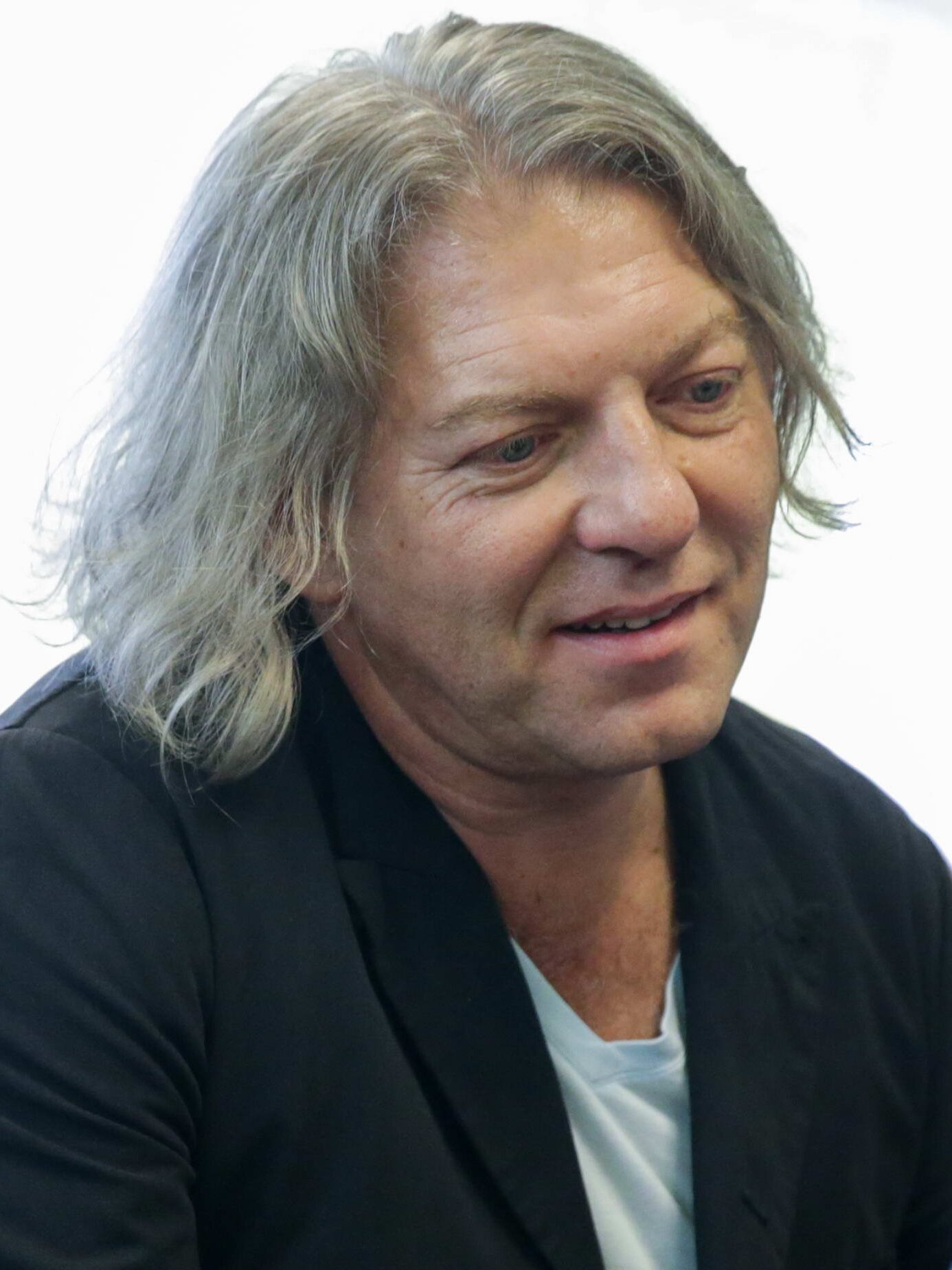
- Oleinikov in 2019
- Born: Aleksandr Anatolyevich Oleinikov; 21 October 1965; Moscow, Russian SFSR, Soviet Union
- Died: 24 January 2026 (aged 60)
- Citizenship: Soviet Union; Russia
- Occupations: Film producer; screenwriter; director; television presenter
- Years active: 1985–2026

Aleksandr Anatolyevich Oleinikov (Russian: Александр Анатольевич Олейников; 21 October 1965 – 24 January 2026) was a Russian director, screenwriter, film producer and television presenter.

== Early life and career ==
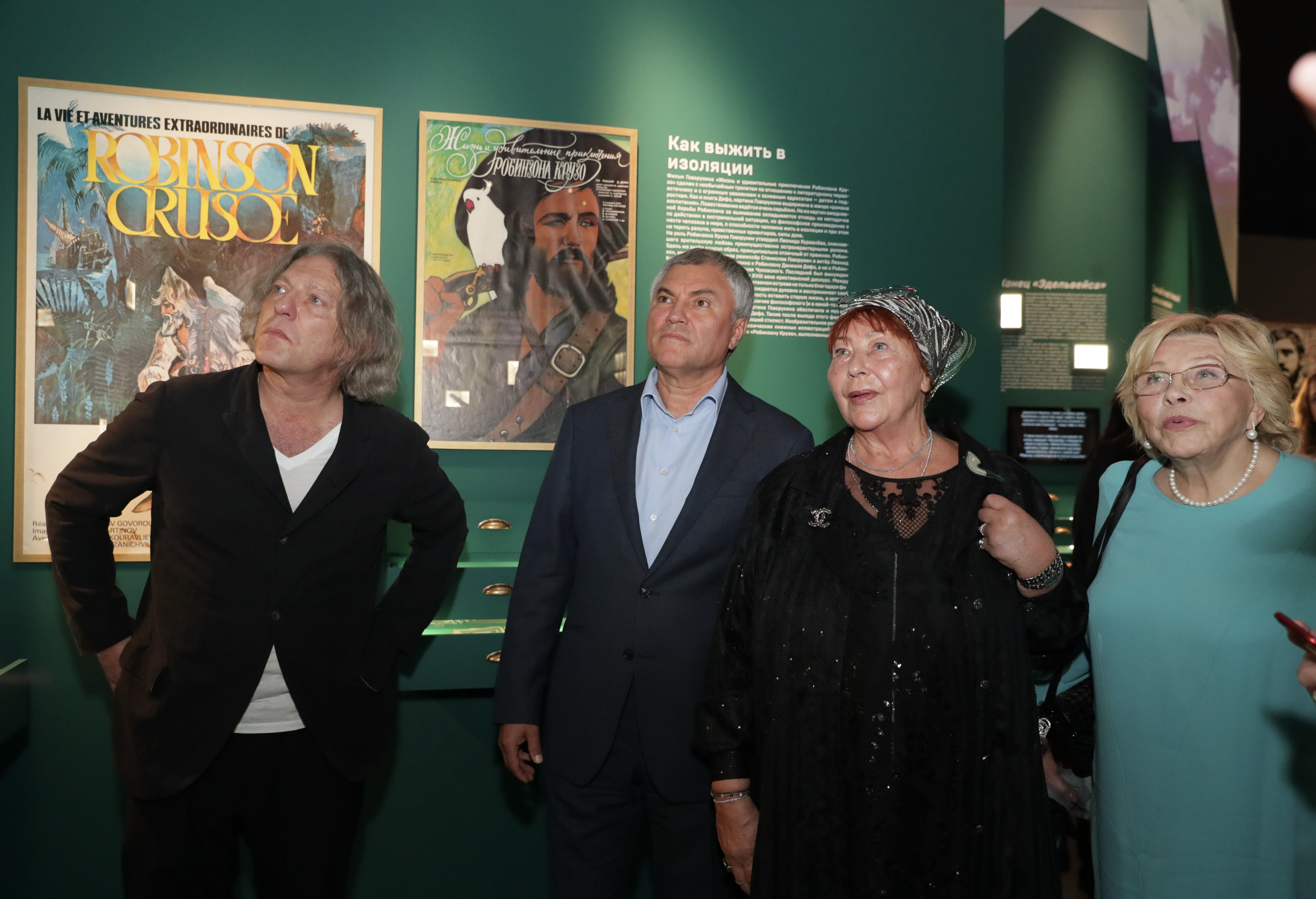
Aleksandr Oleinikov, Vyacheslav Volodin, director Stanislav Govorukhin's widow Galina and Yelena Drapeko at the opening of the 2021 exhibit Vertical

Oleinikov studied at School No. 1531, Moscow. In his childhood he played chess (receiving the highest youth grade) and ice hockey, and was interested in history and literature. He studied together with Mikhail Prokhorov, Georgiy Boos, Mikhail Khleborodov, and Sergey Arkhipov. From 1983 until 1985 he served in the Soviet Army, in the Forces of Special Designation (radio-scouts). He subsequently continued his education at the part-time section of the institute of culture, however he did not complete his degree.

He worked in the television industry from 1985. Oleinikov worked as an administrator for a local (oblast-level) editorial division, then as a director's assistant and a director at the Moscow branch of USSR State Committee for Television and Radio for Moscow Television Channel. He also worked for some time in German television, where he was a concert director for Dieter Bohlen, and also for VIDgital, where Andrey Rasbash and Vladislav Listyev invited him.

In 1993, he became a secretary for the Union of Cinematographers of the Russian Federation. In the same year he arrived at the recently founded television channel TV-6 (Russia). On various occasions he led the broadcasts My Cinema, My Star (alternating with Viktor Merezhko), My History, and Your Music.

In 1994 in Tunisia he recorded a film about Yasir Arafat for subsequent showing on TV-6; in the same year he became the deputy directory of TV-6 Moscow. From 1995 until 1997 he was the general producer for TV-6.

In 1997 he became First Deputy General Director for the Direction of TV-6 Moscow at Moscow Independent Broadcasting Corporation.

From 1997 to 2000 he was the community relations manager for Moscow International Film Festival, and leader of press conferences at it.

From 1998 until 1999 he was the director for direction of programme planning and launching at Moscow Independent Broadcasting Corporation, further, from 1999 until 2001, he was the deputy general director.

From 2001, he was a member of the Russian Television Academy.

On 26 April 2001, after the NTV Affair and transfer of NTV ex-journalists to TV-6, Oleinikov left TV-6. Oleinikov's last project on that channel was the entertainment programme Oh these kids already!, which released in April 2001», which transferred with him to NTV from September 2001. The last motion signed by him as deputy general director of TV-6 was an order to play the informative programme Results with Yevgeny Kiselyov live on air.

From May until October 2001 he worked as a general producer for NTV (Russia), and participated in the launch of an array of television broadcasts from 2001 until 2002. From May 2001 until March 2002 he was also the programme director for NTV. He was invited to NTV by Alfred Koch. He left the channel in March 2002; Oleinikov's sacking from occupied posts was linked with the low ratings and multiple failed live launches which had occurred under his leadership.

In 2002 he transferred to Russia-1, where he became a manager for two television projects (Good Morning (Russian TV program) and Vesti (VGTRK). He later worked as a freelance producer, launching artistic films and TV series for various channels.

From March 2006 until November 2012 he was the general producer for TV Centre (Russia).

From 2 September until 15 November 2013, he was a co-producer of the third season of the show Evening Urgant on Channel One Russia.

== Personal life and death ==
Oleinikov's first wife was Irina Borisovna Medvedeva, a Muscovite, born in 1969.

- Son – Maksim, from his first marriage, born on 8 May 1988.
- Daughter – Darya, out of wedlock, born on 5 February 1992.

His cohabitant (from 1993 until 2010) was Darya Drozdovskaya, an actress, television presenter, and editor.

- Son – Aleksandr, now an actor, born on 26 May 1993.
- Younger Daughter – Darya, born on 17 February 1998.

Oleinikov died on 24 January 2026, at the age of 60.
