= Artyom Borovik =

Russian investigative journalist

- Артëм Боровик
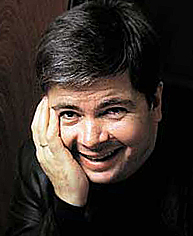
- Born: 13 September 1960
- Died: 9 March 2000 (aged 39)
- Occupation: Investigative journalist, media proprietor
- Parent(s): Genrikh Borovik
- Awards: Medal "For Battle Merit"; Medal "Defender of a Free Russia" (1993)
- Website: sovsekretno.ru

Artyom (Note: Sometimes transcribed to English as Artem) Genrikhovich Borovik (Russian: Артём Ге́нрихович Борови́к, IPA: [ɐrˈtʲɵm ˈɡʲenrʲɪxəvʲɪtɕ bərɐˈvʲik]; 13 September 1960 – 9 March 2000) was a Russian investigative journalist and media magnate. He was the son of a Soviet journalist, Genrikh Borovik, who worked for many years as a foreign correspondent in the U.S.

== Journalism ==
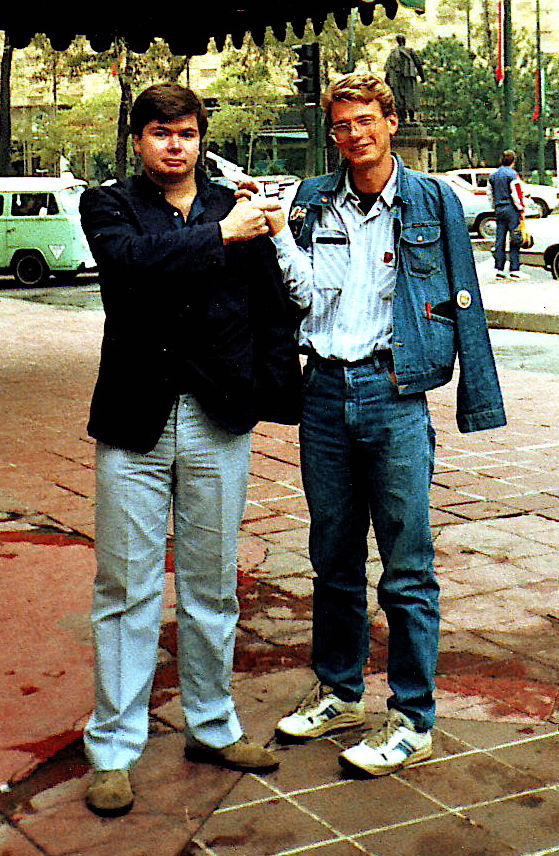
Artyom Borovik and Yevgeny Dodolev in Mexico, 1989

Borovik first appeared on Soviet television in late 1980s as one of the hosts of a highly progressive and successful Vzglyad (which literally translates as The View or The Look), a kind of satirical television show watched weekly by as many as 100 million people. The other anchors were Vladislav Listyev, Alexander Lyubimov and Alexander Politkovsky.

Borovik was a pioneer of investigative journalism in the Soviet Union during the beginning of glasnost. He worked for the American CBS program 60 Minutes during the 1990s, and began publishing his own monthly investigative newspaper Top Secret, which grew into a mass-media company involved in book publishing and television production. In 1999, Borovik started an investigative program called Versia in partnership with U.S. News & World Report.

His Top Secret TV programme often focused on corruption cases involving Russia's political and economic elite. The programme, as well as Borovik's print publications, Top Secret and Versia, were openly critical of Vladimir Putin. Borovik also opposed the First and Second Chechen Wars. His last investigation was about the Russian apartment bombings of 1999, which he and others alleged had actually been orchestrated by the Russian FSB. In one of his last papers, he quoted Putin, who said: "There are three ways to influence people: blackmail, vodka, and the threat to kill." This quote Borovik based on Der Spiegel and Stern, German magazines.

== Death ==
Borovik died in an aircraft crash at Sheremetyevo International Airport on 9 March 2000. The Yakovlev Yak-40 was chartered by the Chechen oil industry executive Ziya Bazhayev for a flight to Kyiv. All nine people on board, including five crew, perished in the crash. The originally scheduled aircraft was due to depart at 8:00 in the morning of 9 March 2000; however, due to Borovik's planned flight being delayed, Bazhayev offered Borovik a seat on his aircraft.

The official investigation into the crash by the Interstate Aviation Committee revealed that whilst snow was removed from the aircraft exterior, de-icing fluid was not applied. The crew did not ask for permission to enter the taxiway, which was done at too high a speed for the icy conditions, and the flaps were set to 11 degrees, instead of 20 degrees. The aircraft reached a speed of 165 km/h, when the crew began to rotate the aircraft, at which stage it reached a 13-degree angle of attack, and stalled 8–10 metres off the ground. The airplane rolled left and struck the ground with a 60-65 degree bank angle and crashed.

According to historian Yuri Felshtinsky and political scientist Vladimir Pribylovsky, Borovik's death may have been linked to his publications about Vladimir Putin just before the presidential elections that took place on 26 March. He died three days prior to the scheduled publication of materials about Putin's childhood. At this time, he also conducted an investigation of the 1999 Moscow apartment bombings. Borovik had studied Vera Putina's claims.

Borovik is buried at Novodevichy Cemetery in Moscow.

== Artyom Borovik award ==
The Artyom Borovik award "for outstanding creative achievements in the field of independent journalism and investigative journalism in the Russian media" was established by a charitable organisation named after Artyom Borovik and headed by Genrikh Borovik. On September 13, 2001, the first winners of the award were named.

=== Winners ===
- 2001: Anna Politkovskaya
- 2002: Roman Gusarov
- 2007: Marianna Maksimovskaya
- 2008: Alexei Venediktov
- 2010: Alexander Carmen
- 2012: Roman Anin

== His books ==
Borovik published several books, including The Hidden War, about the Soviet–Afghan War.

- Artyom Borovik. Russian in the U.S. Army. Hippocrene Books, Inc. 1990. ISBN 0-87052-627-8
- Artyom Borovik. Hidden War: A Russian Journalist's Account of the Soviet War in Afghanistan. Grove/Atlantic, Inc. 1992. ISBN 0-87113-283-4
