= Vzglyad =

Vzglyad (‹The template Lang-rus is being considered for deletion.› Russian: Взгляд, IPA: [ˈvzɡlʲat], "Glance", "View", "Look") may refer to:

- Vzglyad (Russian TV program), a Soviet and Russian TV program
  - VIDgital, initially VID, a Russian production company, founded by Vzglyad creators
- Vzglyad (newspaper), a Russian online newspaper produced by Konstantin Rykov
