= Larisa Sinelshchikova =

Russian media manager and producer (born 1963)

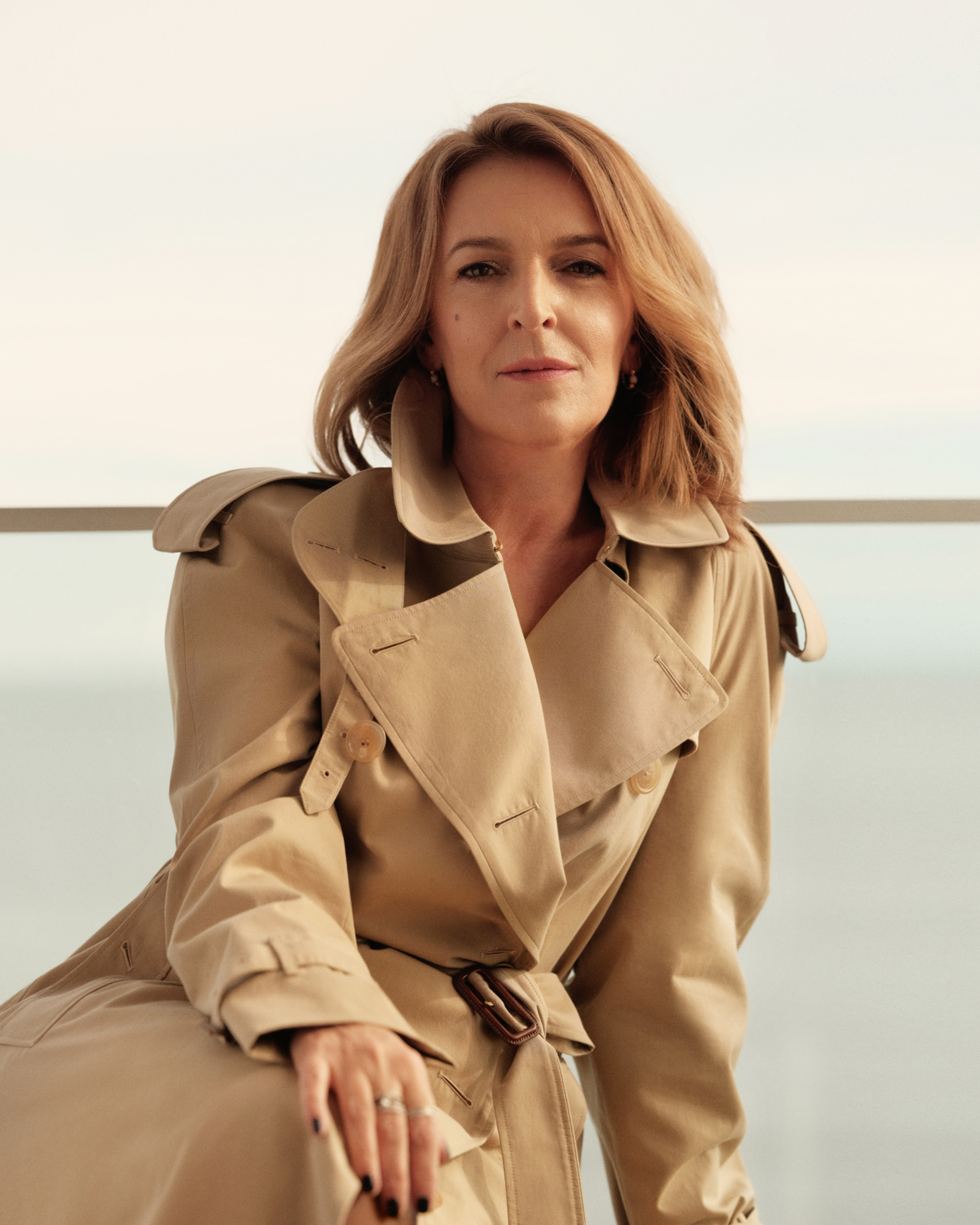
- Sinelshchikova in 2019
- Born: February 10, 1963 (age 63); Psebay, Krasnodar Krai, Russian SFSR, Soviet Union
- Citizenship: Russia
- Education: Russian Institute of Theatre Arts
- Occupations: Media manager, television producer, music producer
- Children: 2
- Awards
- Website: slv-media.ru

Larisa Vasilevna Sinelshchikova (Russian: Лариса Васильевна Синельщикова; born February 10, 1963) is a Russian media manager and producer. She is a member of the Academy of Russian Television and a laureate of TEFI — Russian National TV award.

== Biography ==
=== Early years, education ===
Larisa Sinelshchikova was born on February 10, 1963, in the village of Psebay in Mostovsky District in Krasnodar Krai. After finishing secondary school #4 in 1979, she left for Moscow and entered the Russian Academy of Theatre Arts (GITIS). She graduated with a specialty of ‘director’ in 1984

=== TV-6 and VID ===
From 1993 to 1998, Larisa Sinelshchikova held the post of vice-president of the TV-6 channel, and from 1994 she was the general director of the TV-6 Media agency, which is the first Russian television advertising sales agency.

In 1998, at Alexander Lyubimov’s invitation, she took the position of general director of VID television company, a major supplier of television programs and shows for ORT channel (Channel One Russia). In 2000 Sinelshchikova left the position of general director and headed the board of directors of VID and held this position until 2007.

In 2001 Sinelshchikova became a member of the Academy of Russian Television.

=== Red Square ===
In July 2007 Sinelshchikova founded her own television company, Red Square, which became Russia's first full-cycle television holding company, which was engaged in the production of television programs, technical support of filming, copyright distribution, advertising, sponsorship contracts, Internet projects and projects in the field of show business. The company worked mainly with Channel One and produced the most important and top-rated projects for it. Red Square was also responsible for filming the 54th Eurovision Song Contest, which was held in Moscow in 2009.

By the beginning of 2010, Red Square became the largest producer of television content in Russia. According to KVG Research, in 2012 there were 58 shows, television films and series produced by Red Square, which went on air, and that made one tenth of the total premiere time of Russian television - a quarter more than the nearest competitor. Many projects of Red Square were shown to the evening prime time of Channel One. Among them are The Voice, Kto khochet stat' millionerom? (Who Wants to Be a Millionaire?), Minuta slavy (Minute of Glory), Let's Get Married, Fashion Verdict, Posner and others. According to Interfax, the revenue of Red Square in 2013 amounted to 4.64 billion rubles, with 2.63 billion of net profit.

According to Vedomosti newspaper, Sinelshchikova had been planning to sell Red Square since 2012. In mid-2013, Red Square was joined by a number of subsidiaries of legal entities. In April 2014 it became known that Sinelshchikova agreed to sell 51% of registered capital of the Red Square companies to Arkady Rotenberg. Andrei Baturin, the official representative of the businessman, explained that Rotenberg's interest in the company is connected to the growing importance of content for modern media and the need to rely on ‘the first and the best’. The parties did not disclose the terms of the transaction, but they noted that the company was evaluated higher than the market. It was known before that Sinelshchikova directly owned small shares in the companies that made up Red Square, while the main ones were owned by offshore structures. During the transaction, the ownership structure of the television company was disclosed for the first time, and Sinelshchikova was named the ultimate beneficiary of all the companies.

With the new shareholder, personnel changes took place in the management of Red Square, and the company itself began to cooperate with VGTRK, the main competitor of Channel One. Vedomosti, referring to a high-ranking employee of Channel One, noted that this led to a remarkable alienation between the TV channel and the TV company. In July 2015, during the second transaction, Rotenberg bought the remaining 49% of the company from Sinelshchikova and became the only owner of Red Square.

=== First Music Publishing ===
In 2015, after the sale of Red Square, Sinelshchikova agreed to withdraw from the First Music Publishing, in which she directly owned a share of 60%, and before that - through a share in the recording studio REAL Records. 1MP was founded in 2003, and by the mid-2010s it became one of the largest music publishers in the country. In 2014 the 1MP revenue amounted to 403 mln rubles with 54 mln of net profit. The deal became known in September 2016. Sinelshchikova's share was distributed among producers Viktor Drobysh, Vladimir Dubovitsky, Igor Matvienko, Konstantin Meladze and Maxim Fadeyev, with whom she had worked for many years. The amount of the agreement was not disclosed.

== Awards ==
=== State ===
- Medal of the Order "For Merit to the Fatherland", II class (November 27, 2006) - for great contribution to the development of Russian television and radio broadcasting and many years of fruitful activity
- Medal of the Order "For Merit to the Fatherland", I class (April 23, 2008) - for informational support and active public work on the development of civil society in the Russian Federation
- Certificate of Honor of the President of the Russian Federation (December 9, 2009) - For active participation in the preparation and conduct of the Eurovision-2009 song contest in Moscow

==== Professional ====
- TEFI-2003 in the nomination ‘Producer’ for the TV show ‘The Last Hero - 3’ (with Alexander Lyubimov and Konstantin Ernst)
- The finalist of TEFI-2004 in the nomination ‘Scriptwriter of a TV program’ for the TV show ‘The Last Hero. End of the Game’ (with Alexander Lyubimov, Konstantin Ernst, Sergey Kushnerev)
- Finalist of TEFI-2008 in the nomination ‘Producer of a television program’ for the TV show ‘Two Stars - 2’ (with Andrei Boltenko)
- TEFI-2009 in the nomination ‘Producer of a TV program’ for the Eurovision-2009 song contest

=== Other ===
- The national award for public recognition of the achievements of women of Russia ‘Olympia’ (March 2, 2007) in the nomination ‘Business-style’ - for great contribution to the development of Russian television and creation of a series of bright multi-genre TV programs

== Personal life ==
Sinelshchikova has a daughter Anastasia (married to Igor Rudsky, Svetlana Bondarchuk's younger brother) and a son Igor.

In 1998, at a symphony concert at the Moscow Conservatory, Sinelshchikova met Konstantin Ernst. The two were in a civil marriage from 1998 to 2010. The gossip journalists noted Sinelschikova's great contribution to Ernst's achievements as head of ORT and Channel One. Sinelshchikova and Ernst broke up in 2010.
