= Genrikh Borovik =

Russian journalist

- Генрих Боровик
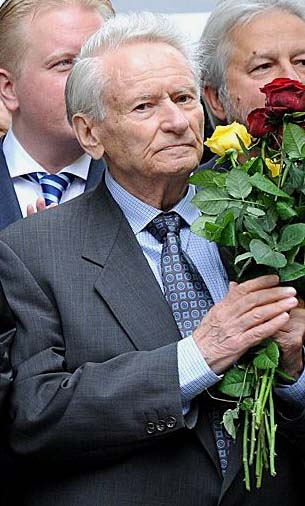
- Born: 16 November 1929 (age 96); Russian SFSR
- Education: MGIMO
- Occupations: Publicist, writer, playwright, filmmaker
- Awards: USSR State Prize; Order "For Merit to the Fatherland"; Order of the October Revolution; Order of the Red Banner of Labour; Order of Friendship of Peoples

Genrikh Averyanovich Borovik (Russian: Ге́нрих Аверьянович Борови́к; born 16 November 1929, Minsk) is a Soviet and Russian publicist, writer, playwright and filmmaker, the father of journalist Artyom Borovik.

According to Soviet defector Vasili Mitrokhin, Borovik was a KGB agent in the United States, one of whose successful projects was promotion of false John F. Kennedy assassination theories through writer Mark Lane.

In 1967, as senior APN correspondent in the US, Borovik was reported to have "sounded out the possibility of broadcasting a program about Vietnam on the network of one of the largest American television corporations".

He also wrote a book about famous Soviet spy Kim Philby.

Voice recording

Borovik was the fourth and the last chairman of the Soviet Peace Committee, in the years 1987–1991.
