= Krasny Kvadrat =

Russian television production company

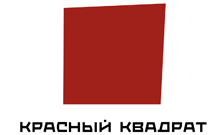
- Company type: Limited Liability Company
- Industry: TV
- Founded: 2007
- Founder: Larisa Sinelshchikova
- Headquarters: Akademika Koroleva Str, 12, Ostankino Technical Center, Moscow, Russia
- Key people: Arkady Rotenberg (sole owner since June 2015) Larisa Sinelshchikova (sole owner until June 2015); Ilya Krivitsky (President, CEO) Ildus Kurmaleev (Main director since 2007)
- Products: Event TV projects, entertainment shows, talk shows, documentaries, advertising, content distribution
- Number of employees: 1000+
- Subsidiaries: Krasnaya Studiya, Zelyonaya Studiya, Oranzhevaya Studiya, Sinyaya Studiya, Belaya Studiya, Technostyle Technology, Mandarin, Izyum, Granat, Krasny Kvadrat Kino, Pyat Zvyozd, Krasny Kvadrat Muzyka, Krasny Kvadrat Project, REAL Records, Krasny Kvadrat Design, Casting Technology, Krasny Kvadrat Media House

Krasny Kvadrat (Russian: Красный Квадрат, literally Red Square - 'square' with the meaning of 'quadrilateral', a geometric shape with 4 sides) is the first Russian full-scale television and production media holding company producing TV and music content, including development and production of original TV formats, copyrights management and distribution, sponsorship and product placement.

Krasny Kvadrat produces TV shows, TV series, documentary and feature films and is engaged in concert activities. The most famous projects are TV shows “Minuta Slavy” (“Minute of Fame”), “Kto khochet stat' millionerom?” (“Who Wants to Be a Millionaire?”), “Kontrol'naya Zakupka” (“Test Purchase”), “Modny Prigovor” (“Fashion Judgment”), “Davay Pozhenimsya” (“Let's Get Married”), TV series “Shkola” (“School”), “Popytka Very” (“Vera's Try”), “Garazhi” (“Garages”), “Pobeg” (“Escape”) etc.

== Structure and Activities ==
Krasny Kvadrat was founded in 2007 by Russian media manager and producer Larisa Sinelshchikova, who was the first in Russia to propose and implement a model of TV full-cycle holding management in the form of umbrella branding.

Krasny Kvadrat has been producing shows for Channel One Russia, Russia-24 and STS TV channels. Krasny Kvadrat also produced shows for Russia-1, TV Tsentr, Zvezda, Peretz and Carousel TV channels. In addition to shows and films, Krasny Kvadrat is engaged in concert activities.

By the end of 2016, Krasny Kvadrat is expected to make a decision regarding the production of the magazine “Modny Prigovor”, based on a fashion television program of the same name.

== Company Management ==
Since February 2017 the CEO of Krasny Kvadrat has been Ilya Krivitsky, who also was the CEO of the holding in 2012-2014 and from February to September 2015.

Earlier Krasny Kvadrat was headed by Andrey Kurpatov (2007-2012), Roman Sarkisov (from August 2014 to February 2015) and Alexey Kisin (from September 2015 to February 2017).

== Owners ==
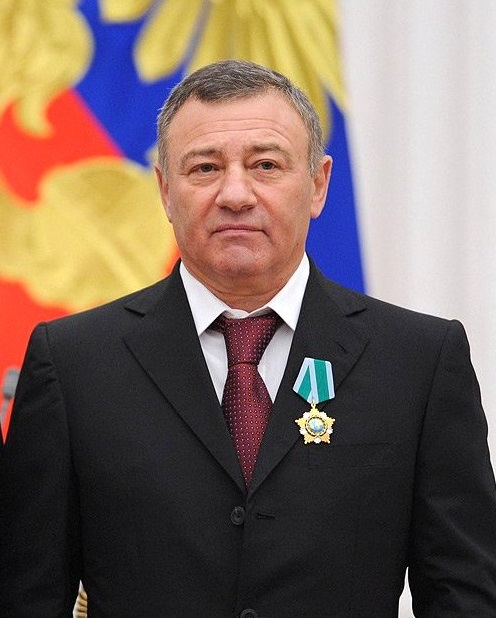
Arkady Rotenberg, sole owner of Krasny Kvadrat (since June 2015)

From July 24, 2007 to April 3, 2014, the sole owner of Krasny Kvadrat was its president and founder Larisa Sinelshchikova.

On April 3, 2014 Sinelshchikova sold 51 percent share in Krasny Kvadrat LLC, Mandarin LLC, Granat LLC and Izyum LLC to Russian tycoon Arkady Rotenberg.

Leading American magazine focusing on film industry, television, and entertainment industries The Hollywood Reporter described the deal as a "sale of a controlling stake in Russia's biggest TV content producer".

According to official representative of Rotenberg Andrey Baturin, "the decision to acquire a controlling stake in Krasny Kvadrat was motivated by a clear understanding of the growing importance of the content for modern media and, of course, the need to prioritize the first and best".

In June 2015 Sinelshchikova sold the remaining 49 percent share to Rotenberg.

The tycoon became the sole owner of Krasny Kvadrat.

== Highlights ==
In 2015 revenues of Krasny Kvadrat fell by 23% to 4.998 billion rubles due to a reduction in the total volume of content purchased by Channel One Russia, and its net profit decreased to 446.5 million rubles.

== Headquarters ==
The head office of Krasny Kvadrat from the date of its establishment up to the present time is located in Ostankino Technical Center in Moscow, Russian Federation.

== Interesting Facts ==
At the same time white coloring with red chairs and other elements highlight the name of the company.
