= Eduard Sagalaev =

Russian journalist (1946–2023)

- Эдуард Сагалаев
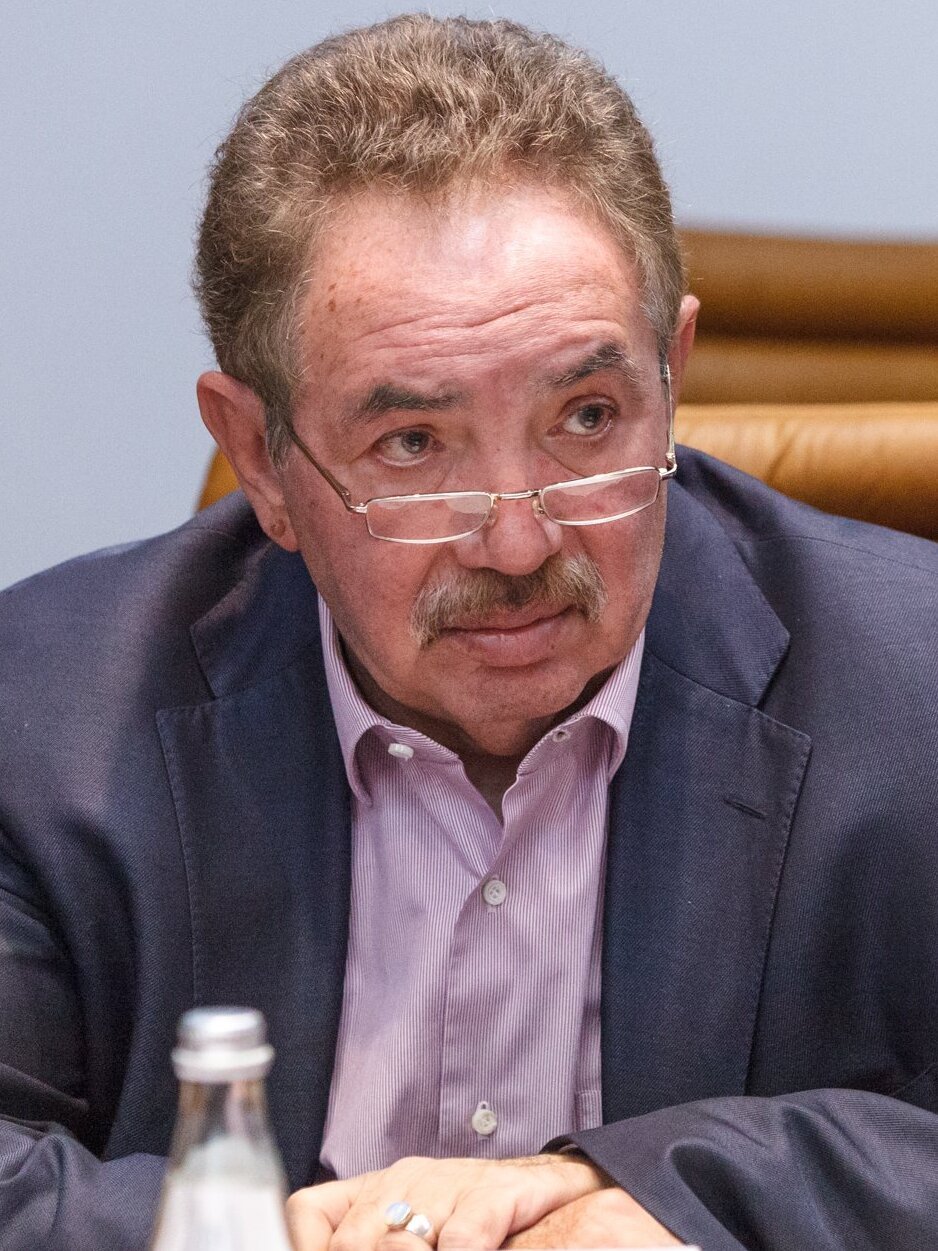
- Sagalaev in 2014
- Born: 3 October 1946; Samarkand, Uzbek SSR, USSR
- Died: 13 May 2023 (aged 76); Moscow, Russia

Eduard Mikhailovich Sagalaev (Russian: Эдуа́рд Миха́йлович Сагала́ев; 3 October 1946 – 13 May 2023) was a Russian television journalist and media manager.

Sagalaev served as President of the National Association of Broadcasters. He was a member of the Russian Academy of Television. He was also the founder (with Ted Turner) of TV-6, the first commercial television station in Russia. From 15 February 1996 to 10 February 1997, he served as Chairman of the All-Russia State Television and Radio Broadcasting Company.

Sagalaev was the winner of the USSR State Prize (1978) and the Order For Merit to the Fatherland 3rd (2011) and 4th (2006) classes, Order of Friendship (1996).

Sagalaev died in Moscow on 13 May 2023, at the age of 76.

== Gallery ==
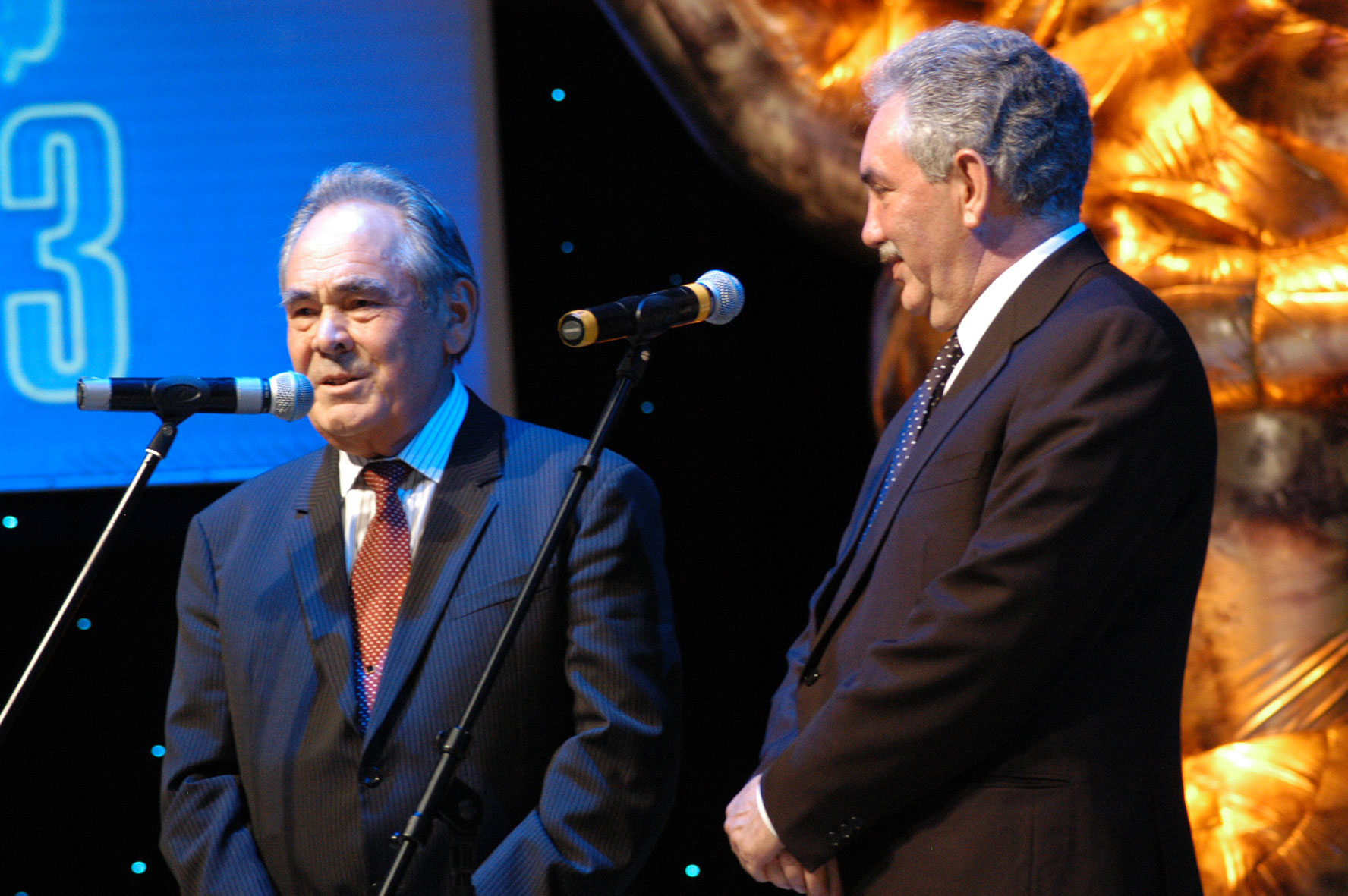

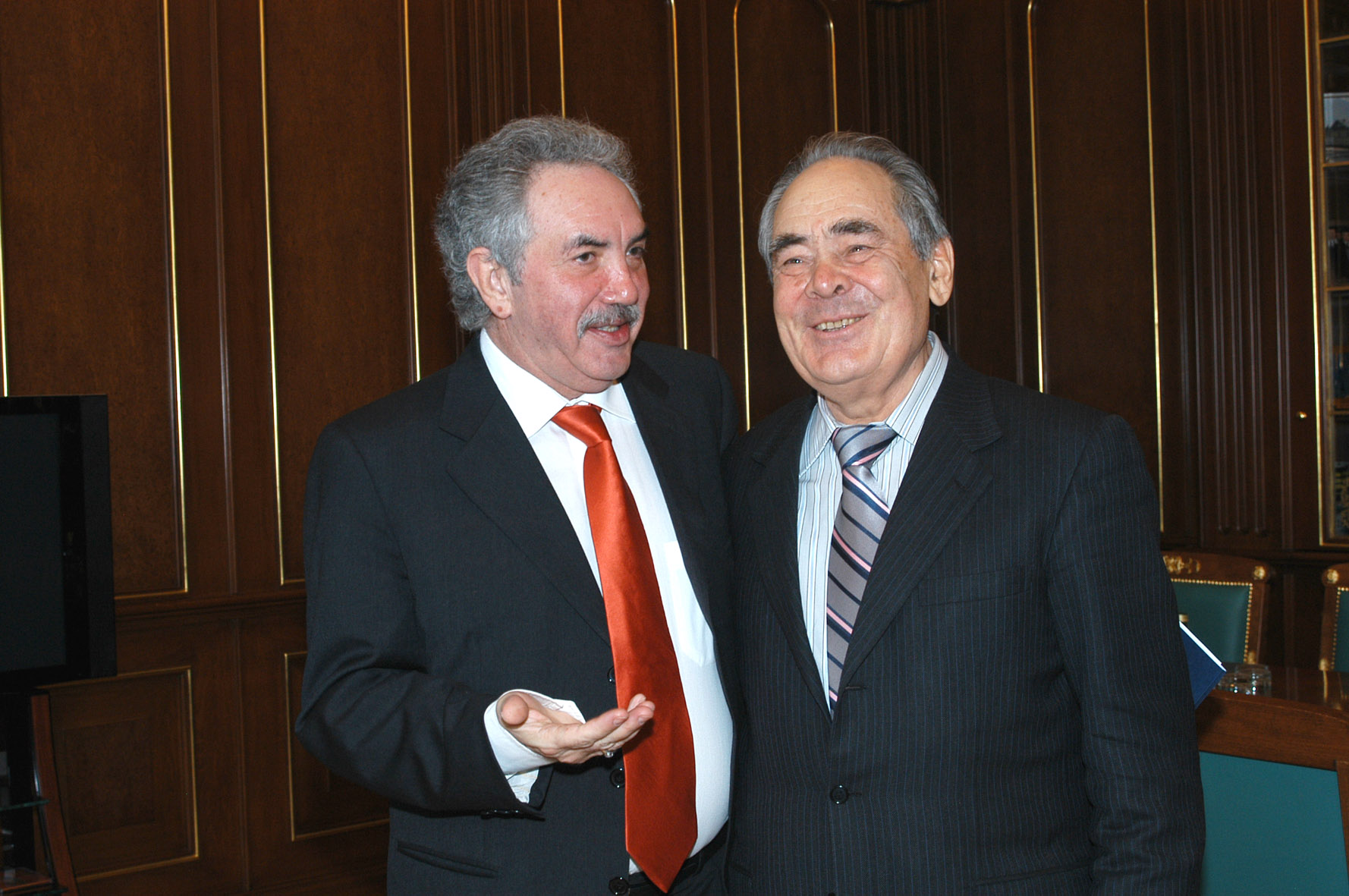

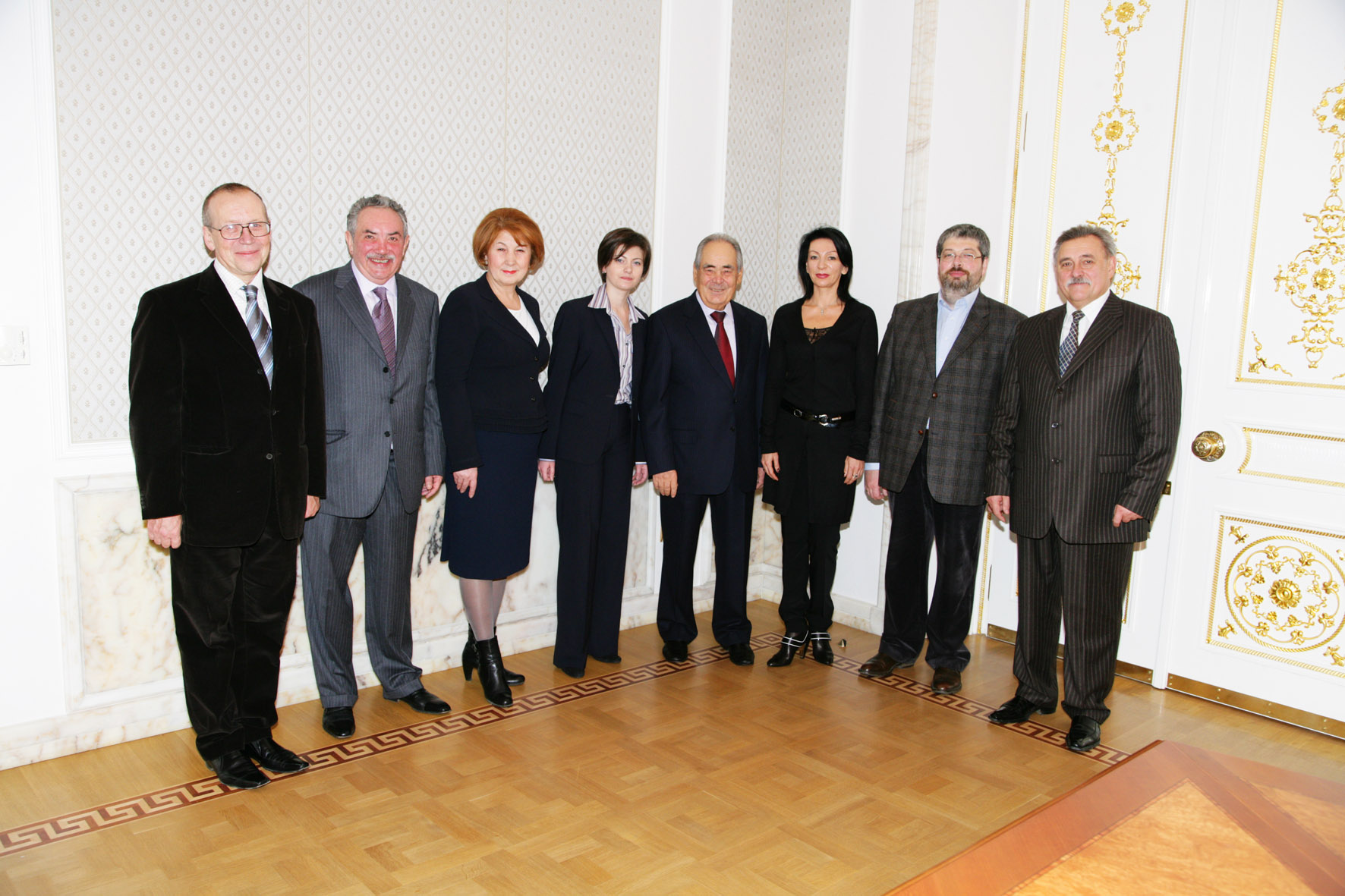

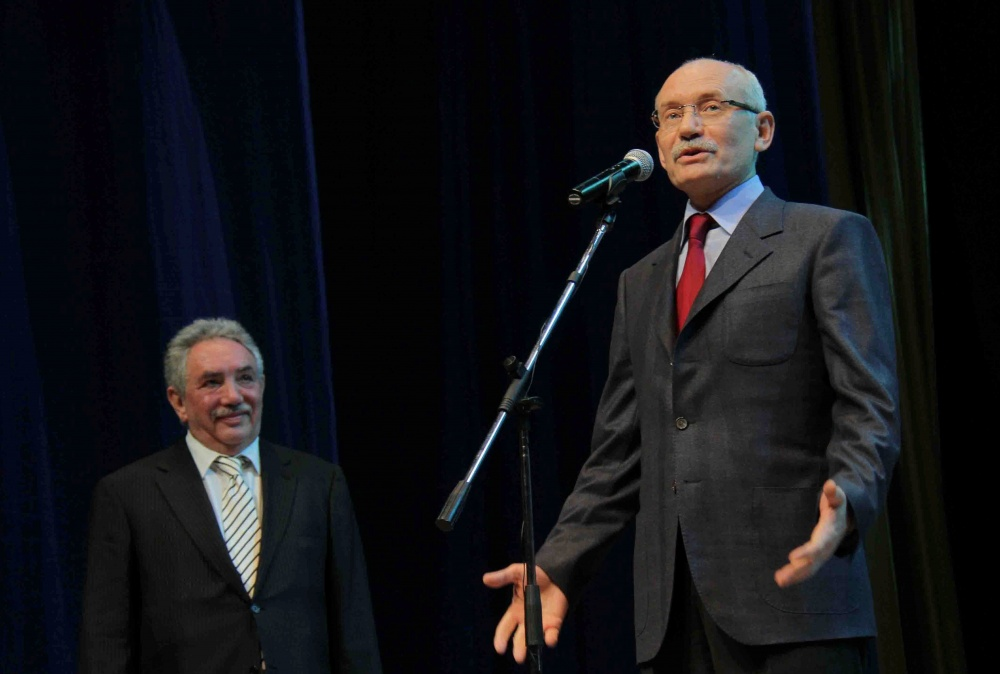

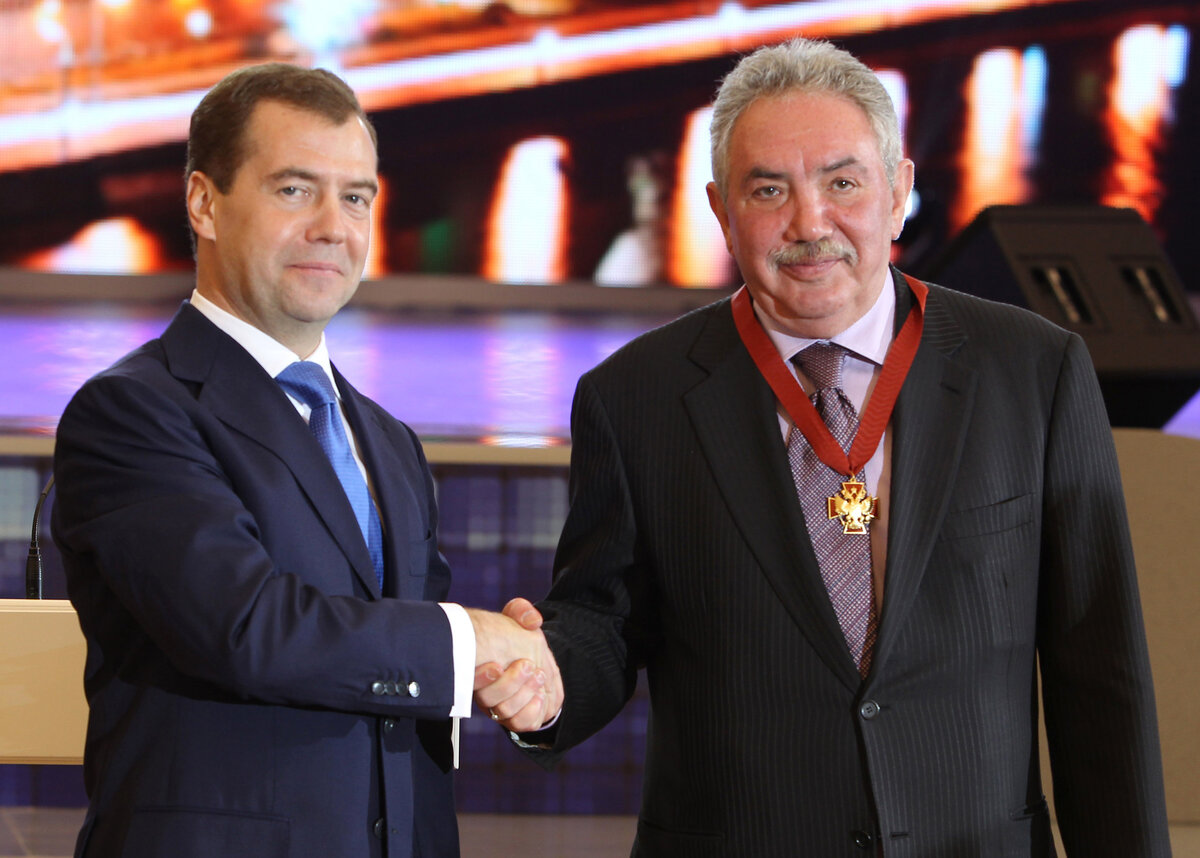

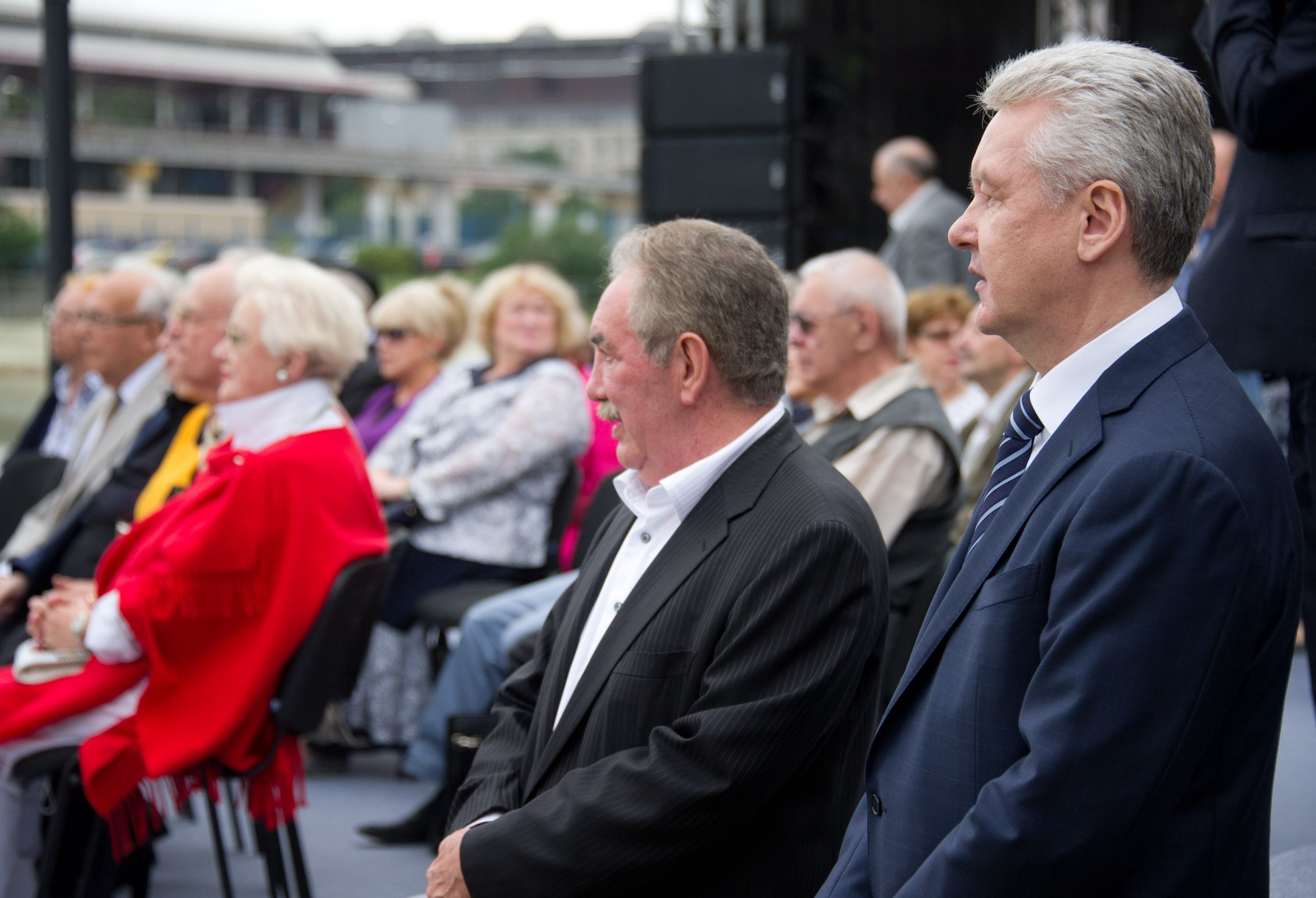

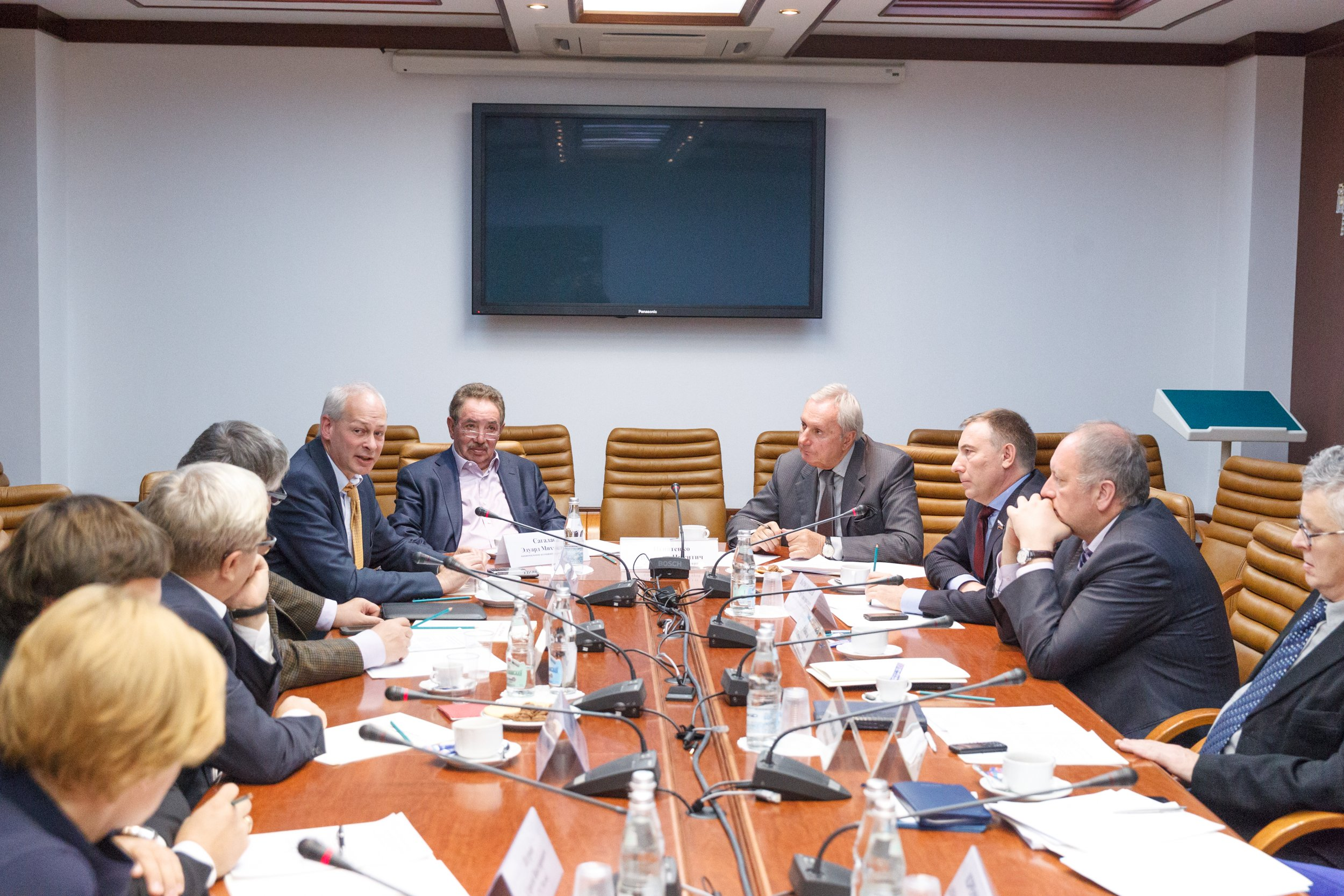

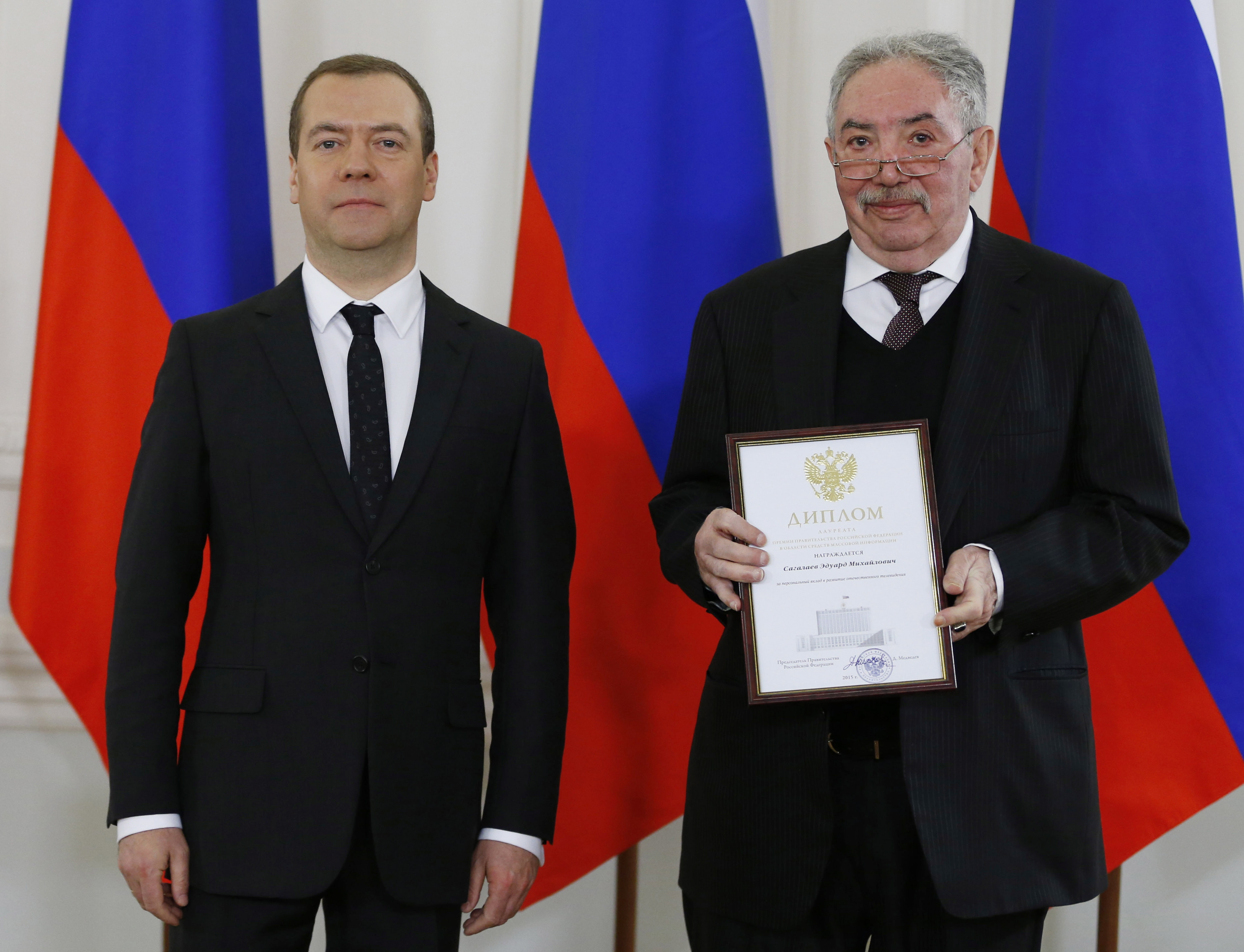
