= Alexander Politkovsky =

Russian journalist, political commentator and professor (born 1953)

- Александр Политковский
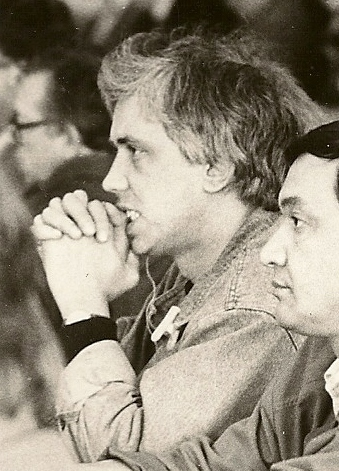
- Politkovsky in 1989
- Born: Alexander Vladimirovich Politkovsky; 15 September 1953 (age 73); Moscow, Russian SFSR, Soviet Union
- Education: Moscow State University
- Occupations: Journalist; political commentator; professor
- Spouse: Anna Politkovskaya (m. 1978; d. 2006)
- Children: 2

Alexander Vladimirovich Politkovsky (Russian: Алекса́ндр Влади́мирович Политко́вский; born 15 September 1953) is a Russian journalist, political commentator, and a professor at the Moscow Institute of Television and Radio Broadcasting.

From 1987 to 1991 he was a special correspondent and presenter of an infotainment program Vzglyad. Politkovsky was one of the founders of the TV company VID. He was elected as a Deputy of the Russian Federation for the period of 1990 to 1993.

His former spouse Anna Politkovskaya was murdered on 7 October 2006.
