= Andrey Rasbash =

Russian television presenter/producer (1952–2006)

Andrey Razbash
- Born: Andrey Leonidovich Razbash; December 15, 1952; Ust-Kara, Nenets Autonomous Okrug, Arkhangelsk Oblast, RSFSR, USSR
- Died: July 23, 2006 (aged 53); Moscow, Russia
- Resting place: Laykovo Cemetery (Odintsovsky District)
- Occupations: television presenter, television producer
- Spouse: Albina Nazimova

Andrey Leonidovich Razbash (Russian: Андре́й Леони́дович Разба́ш; December 15, 1952, in Ust-Kara, Nenets Autonomous Okrug, Arkhangelsk Oblast – July 23, 2006, in Moscow) was a Soviet and Russian figure TV, cameraman and film director, television presenter, and producer. He was one of the founders of independent TV company VID (17.14%).

== Biography ==
Andrey was born December 15, 1952, in the village of Ust-Kara, Arkhangelsk Oblast.

In 1977 he graduated from Moscow Aviation Institute majoring in radio engineering.

He served two years in the missile and space forces, operating spacecraft of various purposes: by spy satellites and orbital stations. Within one and a half years — the developer of special equipment in military enterprise, engaged in computer programs pattern recognition. Five times he offered to go to work in the KGB, but he refused.

In 1980, was demobilized and came to Television technical center Ostankino, where alternately worked as a video engineer, editor and TV operator. In 1983-1984 he worked in the Department of videos, television programs, senior hardware engineer video and installation.

In 1987 he created a three-part documentary Children of the XX Congress on the generation of the sixties (in collaboration with Leonid Parfenov), then, beginning with the airing of the October program Vzglyad — assistant Director and then Director of the program. He was also the voice of TV company VID.

Andrey Razbash, in 1989, he met with musicians from the band Agatha Christie, and took them for a clips for two songs.

Since 1992, General Director of broadcasting companies VID. Produced and directed first television project together with the Wittle Communication (USA): international educational teleconference between Soviet and American students — live on 10,000 American schools. Leading from the American side — Tom Brokaw. The producer of the project Pole Chudes.

In November 2005 became creative Director of TV channel Zvezda.

Andrey Razbash died suddenly of a heart attack on the night of Sunday July 23, 2006 in Moscow.
