= Vladislav Listyev =

Russian journalist (1956–1995)

- Владислав Листьев
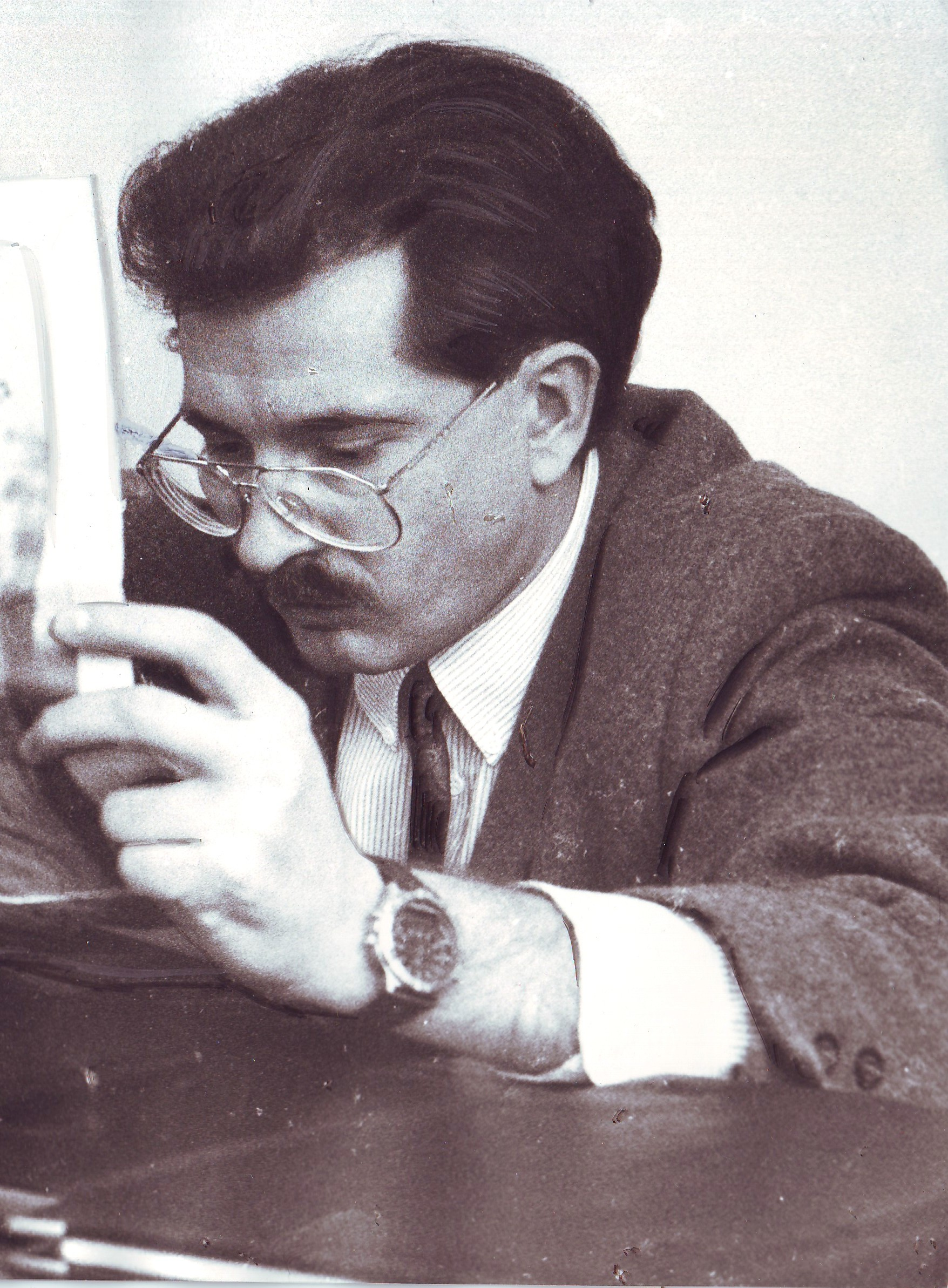
- Listyev in 1992
- Born: Vladislav Nikolayevich Listyev; May 10, 1956; Moscow, Russian Soviet Federative Socialist Republic, Soviet Union
- Died: March 1, 1995 (aged 38); Moscow, Russia
- Cause of death: Assassination
- Resting place: Vagankovo Cemetery, Moscow
- Other name: Vlad Listyev
- Spouse: Albina Nazimova

Vladislav Nikolayevich Listyev (Russian: Владисла́в Никола́евич Ли́стьев; May 10, 1956 – March 1, 1995) was a Soviet, later Russian journalist and head of the ORT TV Channel (now government-owned Channel One).

== Career ==
Listyev was arguably the most popular journalist and TV anchor in Russia (he remains well remembered years after his death), and was a key force in bringing the voice of democracy to Russian television. Listyev first appeared on television as one of the hosts of a progressive and successful show Vzglyad (Glance or Outlook) in the late 1980s. Vzglyad was an outstanding show for that time, after the premiere many people thought it was allowed on TV only by some mistake of censors. The program was ‘like a fresh wind’, it raised the questions that never before were allowed for public discussion, such as Stalin's Great Purge, death penalty, reconstruction of the Cathedral of Christ the Saviour. The program was watched weekly by as many as 100 million people. The other anchors were Alexander Lyubimov, Alexander Politkovsky, Dmitry Zakharov, Artyom Borovik and Yevgeny Dodolev.

He was also the first host of the Russian version of Wheel of Fortune, which became popular. Following the success of Vzglyad, Listyev and his colleagues founded a TV company VID (Vzglyad i Drugiye—The View and the Others) that would produce programming for the First Channel of Soviet Central Television, the main TV channel in the Soviet Union (later reformed into 1st channel Ostankino and ORT). With VID, Listyev started a number of new TV projects —The Field of Wonders (the Russian version of Wheel of Fortune), Ugadai melodiu ("Guess the melody", the Russian version of Name That Tune), Tema ("The Theme"), and Chas Pik ("The Rush Hour"). In 1995, Listyev moved from VID to ORT, where he was appointed director of the channel. One of Listyev's very first moves as director was to order a temporary stop to all advertising, in effect excluding all unauthorized middlemen out of the lucrative advertising business, and consolidating future ad sales in the hands of the channel.

== Assassination ==
Shortly after his appointment, on the evening of March 1, 1995, when returning from the live broadcast of his evening show Chas Pik, Listyev was shot dead on the stairs of his apartment building. Valuables and a large sum in cash that Listyev had on him were left untouched, leading the investigators to conclude that the murder was either a political or business-related assassination. However, despite numerous claims made by investigators that the case was close to resolution, neither the gunmen, nor those who ordered the killing, were ever found.

The killing caused an enormous public outcry—in an unprecedented move, ORT and several other Russian TV channels shut down for the whole day on March 2, displaying only a picture of Listyev and the words "Vladislav Listyev was killed" (Russian: ВЛАДИСЛАВ ЛИСТЬЕВ УБИТ, romanized: VLADISLAV LIST'YEV UBIT). Days later, the channel was reorganized and after a number of different incarnations, came back as the government-controlled Channel One that Russian viewers are now familiar with. Listyev's wake was visited by thousands of people, and President Boris Yeltsin went to the Studios of Channel One himself to deliver a highly emotional eulogy praising Listyev and mourning his death as a great loss for Russia.

There has been much speculation as to the reasons behind Listyev's murder, and two possible causes have been isolated as the most likely: financial and political. When Listyev put the middlemen advertising agencies out of business, he deprived many corrupt businessmen of a source for enormous profits. From the political standpoint, Listyev enjoyed an enormous popularity rating among Russian citizens and could potentially influence the political mood of the whole country.

Paul Klebnikov's article "Godfather of the Kremlin?" in Forbes accused Boris Berezovsky of ordering the murder. Berezovsky sued the magazine for libel in British court. Klebnikov expanded allegations in his book Godfather of the Kremlin: Boris Berezovsky and the looting of Russia. Forbes stated in court that it didn't have evidence of Berezovsky's complicity in Vlad Listyev's murder or any other murder.

According to Yuri Felshtinsky and Vladimir Pribylovsky, top KGB officers Alexander Korzhakov and Alexander Komelkov may have plotted Listyev's murder at the hands of Solntsevskaya Bratva. The authors implied that the motive was to steal the TV advertisement revenue and sponsor Oleg Soskovets for Russia's presidency. The authors believed that Korzhakov also used the murder to blame Berezovsky and to prepare his arrest.

== See also ==
- List of unsolved murders (1980–1999)

== Bibliography ==
- Felshtinsky, Yuri; Pribylovsky, Vladimir (2010). Корпорация. Россия и КГБ во времена Президента Путина (in Russian).
