= VID (company) =

Russian television production company

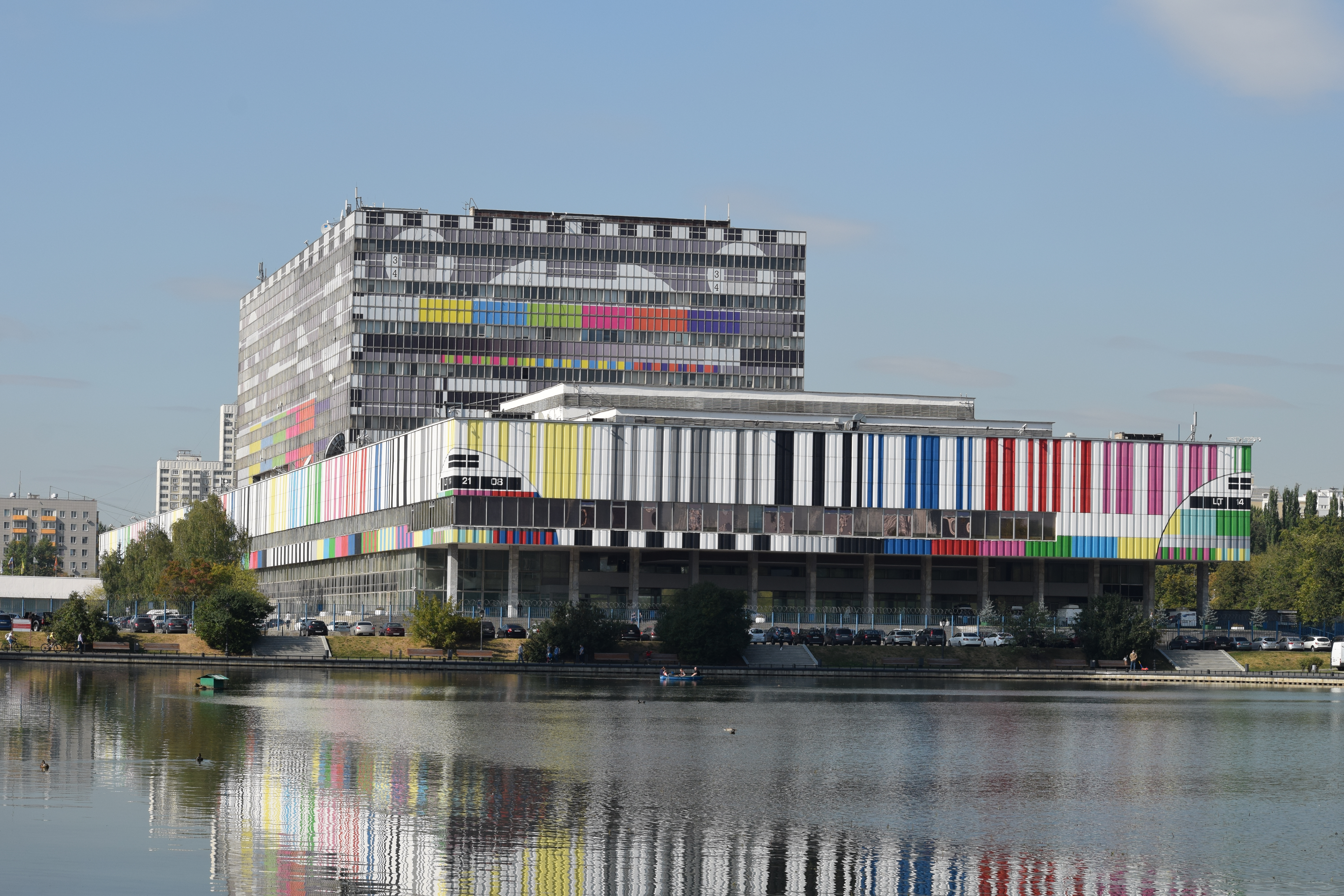
- The Ostankino Technical Center in Moscow, Russia, the headquarters of VID
- Native name: АО «Телекомпания ВИД»
- Formerly: VIDgital (2017-2020)
- Type: Private company
- Industry: Television
- Founded: 1987; 39 years ago
- Founders: Vladislav Listyev; Andrey Rasbash; Alexander Lyubimov; Alexander Politkovsky; Ivan Demidov; Alexander Gorozhankin
- Headquarters: Ostankino Technical Center, 12 Akademika Koroleva Street, Moscow, Russia
- Key people: Vladislav Listyev; Alexander Lyubimov; Larisa Sinelshchikova; Andrey Rasbash; Sergey Kushnerev
- Products: TV programs, entertainment shows, talk shows, documentaries
- Number of employees: 171
- Subsidiaries: AO MuzOboz; AO Disk-kanal; Krylya-media; Pervoye Polye (VID-Design)

VID (Russian: ВИД), (stylized as ВИD, lit. "View"; acronym of Vzglyad i Drugiye, "Outlook and Others",) formerly VIDgital (Russian: ВИDgital) from 2017 to 2020, is a Russian and former Soviet TV production company. VID produces shows for Channel One Russia, NTV and OTR. It is best known for producing the television programmes Wait for Me (Russian: Жди меня), designed to help people find loved ones and Pole Chudes (Поле Чудес) which is a popular Russian version of Wheel of Fortune.

VID's TV shows are also aired by Inter, ONT, Evraziya and Prime TV channels.

== History ==
=== 1987–2000 ===
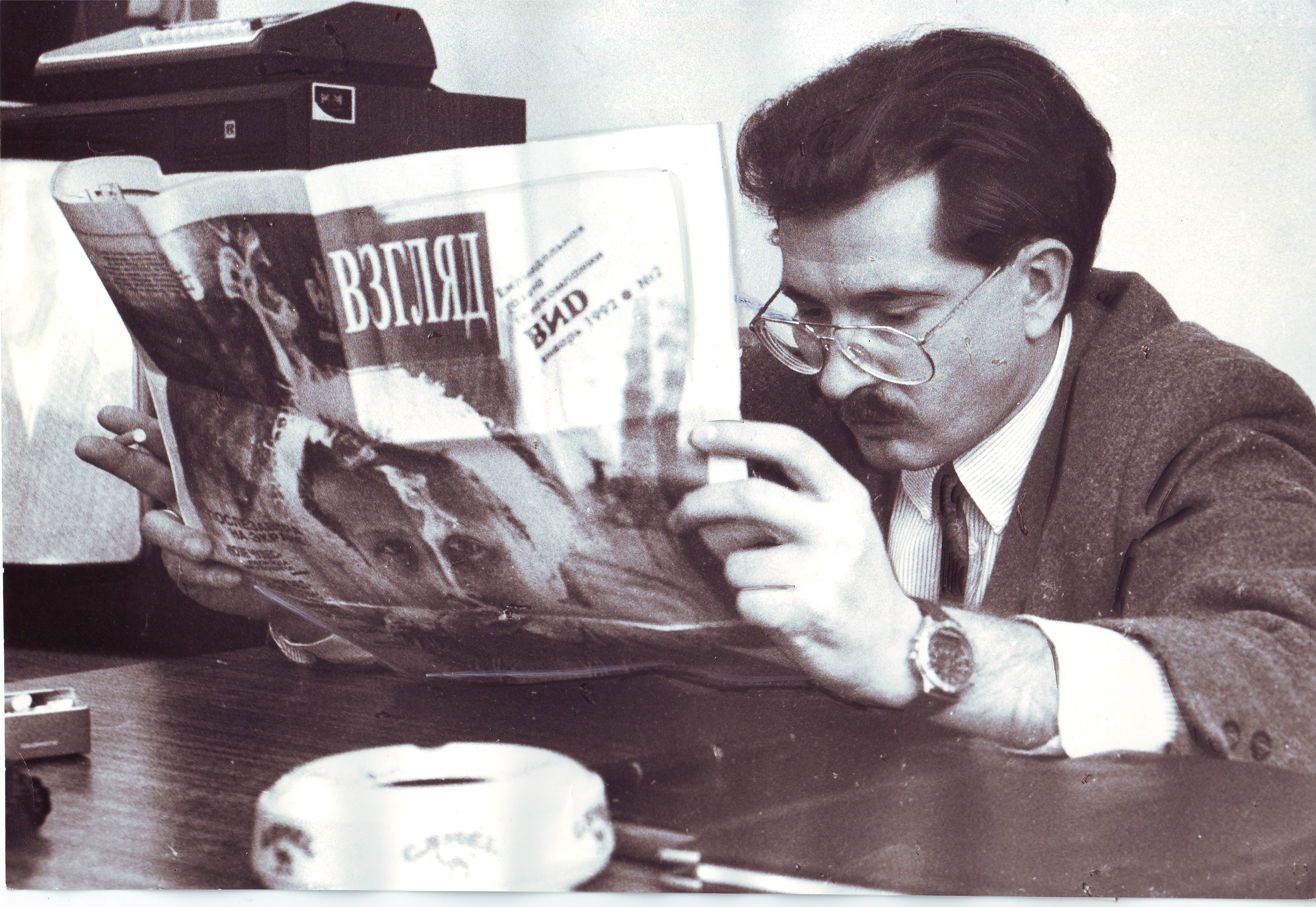
Vladislav Listyev, one of the VID co-founders

The VID Television Company was founded in 1987 by Vladislav Listyev, Andrey Rasbash, Alexander Lyubimov, Alexander Politkovsky, Ivan Demidov and Alexander Gorozhankin, based on Vzglyad, a Russian creative association affiliated with the Youth Editorial Board of the Central Television of the USSR.

In 1990, VID opened new subdivisions in Saint Petersburg and Nizhny Novgorod, which aired their own TV programs.

In Autumn 1991, the Soviet Ministry of Press registered Vzglyad as the official newspaper of the VID Television Company. The newspaper was later renamed Novy Vzglyad, lit. ‘New Outlook’, in May 1992.

VID Predstavlyaet (Russian: ВИD представляет, translated: VID Presents), a TV programme hosted by television speaker Igor Kirillov, was aired on Friday evenings on Ostankino Channel One (1991–1994) and on Wednesdays on Ostankino Channel Four (February–March 1992).

Between 1991 and 1995 VID was in partnership with Experiment, a creative association at Ostankino, the Russian State Television and Radio Company.

Between 1992 and 1994 VID sponsored Ostankino's editorial office for children and co-produced children's programs, Good Night, Little Ones! (Russian: Спокойной ночи, малыши!) and The Call of the Jungle.

In 1992 VID became a shareholder of several companies, such as Muzoboz, Disk-kanal, Pole Chudes, Vzglyad, and InterVID, holding at least 60% of shares in each of them.

From 1993 to 1995 VID, along with ATV and REN TV, was part of the Association of Independent Television Producers, which co-founded the ORT TV channel in 1995.

VID has been a co-founder of TEFI (Russian: ТЭФИ), Russian National TV award by the Russian Academy of Television, since 1994.

From September to November 1998, the RTR TV channel aired Dobroye utro, Rossiya! (Russian: Доброе утро, Россия!, lit. 'Good morning, Russia!'), a morning TV program produced by VID in cooperation with Igor Shestakov's creative workshop.

=== 2000–2017 ===
Later, from 2001 to 2002, VID co-sponsored a group of its subsidiaries.

As part of the reorganization of VID, the following programs suspended their participation in it: VID-Design, later renamed Pervoye Polye (Russian: Первое поле), Obshchestvo Otkrytykh Okon (Russian: Общество открытых окон), Putyovye Sovety (Russian: Путёвые советы), Krylya-Media (Russian: Крылья-Медиа), and others.

In 2000, VID, which had considerably increased the amount of produced content by that time, decided to compete for the Channel 3 broadcasting rights in a contest held by the Russian Ministry of Press and Mass Media.

On 19 April 2000, Larisa Sinelshchikova, CEO of VID, explained this decision as follows: "Any producer dreams of moving to his own home one day. The life of the independent producer on any channel is more like living in a dormitory, so he always longs to move to his own home, all the more so if he ‘produced’ enough relatives to fill up the whole dormitory". At the same time, she believes that "the Government of Moscow wants, so it seems, to have a strong and worthy channel. We are pursuing the same goal".

The broadcasting concept of the channel and the feasibility study were based on the assumption that the new channel's annual budget would be approximately $30,000,000.

On 17 November 2001 VID aired the first season of Posledniy geroy (Russian: Последний герой, translated: Last Hero), the Russian version of the American Survivor reality show, based on the idea that spectators can not only observe the ups and downs of competitions, but also spy on the life of people they don't know.

VID changed its name to VIDgital (VID + digital) on 6 October 2017, explained by Alexander Lyubimov as follows: "We start to seriously consider moving onto the Internet. There you can experiment and try out new turns, new intonations and new ideas".

In September 2017, it was reported that the Zhdi Menya TV show would no longer be broadcast on Channel One Russia. According to federal media resources, Channel One Russia and VIDgital failed to sign the contract for the production of the above-mentioned programme owing to the "new team's personnel policy" and, consequently, the parties’ failure to agree on the candidacy of the new host.

The VIDgital-produced Zhdi Menya began airing on NTV on 27 October 2017.

== Management and shareholders ==
After Listyev's death on 1 March 1995, it was Alexander Lyubimov who managed the company from March 1995 to April 1998.

In April 1998, he suggested Larisa Sinelshchikova, vice-president of the TV-6 Russian commercial TV channel, to become the new CEO of VID.

The Russian financial crisis created a need for new management ideas, and Larisa Sinelshchikova in cooperation with Alexander Lyubimov took an unexpectedly bold decision to expand VID's own television production, an initiative supported by Igor Shabdurasulov and Alexander Akopov, CEOs of ORT and Rossiya television channels respectively.

This measure enables VID to become a major content producer for ORT and, as a result, the leader of Russia's television market in terms of both its standing and finances.

A change in the company's shareholders took place in 1999, with Larisa Sinelshchikova and Sergey Kushnerev becoming VID's new shareholders. The participants did not disclose any information about the sum of the deal, which resulted in all of the previous shareholders giving up their shares, with the exception of Alexander Lyubimov.

In early 2007, VID's main shareholders Alexander Lyubimov and Larisa Sinelshchikova had a major disagreement over the company's further development strategy.

Sinelshchikova promoted her long-lived idea of the umbrella brand, whose implementation would help diversify the management of the company through redistribution of human and financial resources and result in the shareholders’ increased profits.

Lyubimov's rejection of this idea led to Sinelshchikova's withdrawal from VID and her subsequent successful implementation of the umbrella brand concept in her new full-cycle television company, Krasny Kvadrat (Russian: Красный квадрат, translated: Red Square).

== Headquarters ==
VID is based in the Ostankino Technical Center at 12, Akademika Koroleva Street, Moscow.

== Logo ==
The original VID logo was created by Andrey Rasbash.

We wanted the logo to be "alive", back then, everyone was fond of computer graphics and we wanted a living artifact. We thought towards MGM, where the lion roared, but we didn't want animals, we wanted a symbol. And the East is full in every sort of symbols [...]

— Alexander Lyubimov

For this purpose, Rasbash went to the State Museum of Oriental Art of Moscow for advice from Listyev's future wife, Albina Nazimova, who then worked as a restorer at the museum. Among all the options she proposed, Rasbash chose the ceramic mask of the Chinese Taoist philosopher Guo Xiang with a three-pawed toad on his head, based on a ceramic head sculpture found at the Museum of Eastern Art in Moscow. The logo's face was originally a direct copy of the sculpture's, but apparently, the museum attempted to sue VID, leading them to digitally alter the mask in order to avoid legal difficulties. In different cultures, the three-legged toad is interpreted in different ways, such as representing spiritual wealth, power and financial wealth.

The only problem was that the mask had huge ears, like Cheburashka. We sat there, we looked at it and thought, "Well, this is some kind of mess, some terrible Cheburashka", but we cropped off the ears on the computer and everything went well.

— Alexander Lyubimov

The wordmark of the company uses the letter D of the Latin alphabet instead of the Cyrillic Д, so the logo appears as ВИD as opposed to ВИД.

=== Controversy ===
The regular music was a loud, dramatic orchestra-led fanfare that goes off quite bombastic, and is preceded with what sounds like a movie projector and a soft "swoosh" sound.

The original VID opening logo is known being austere and "frightening" in its audio and visuals. When the opening logo was introduced there were many complaints from parents with young children, who found it scary to watch, especially when it preceded or followed children's television. More recently, this version of the opening logo has attracted a large amount of interest from the Internet due to its "eerie" nature, making it a subject of meme culture.

The background music to the intro with the ball falling was composed by Soviet composer Vladimir Ratskevich.

To add to the grievances, the original version of the logo incorporated flashes of bright white light against black backgrounds; this feature was later removed due to epilepsy concerns.

When people started to circulate petitions to remove the old opening logo, VID released a version in 1999 which featured a match being struck, the smoke of which formed the VID logo, although there are no videos of this online. In 2000, a new version of the ident was produced, featuring a smaller version of the logo on a yellow background with the text "VID Television Company presents" (albeit in Russian). In 2002, the mask logo was changed from white to gold.

After VID was renamed to VIDgital in 2017, the logo and intro were heavily redesigned to look more modern and less scary.
