= Alexander Lyubimov =

Russian television journalist, producer and presenter (born 1962)

Aleksander Lubimov
- Александр Любимов
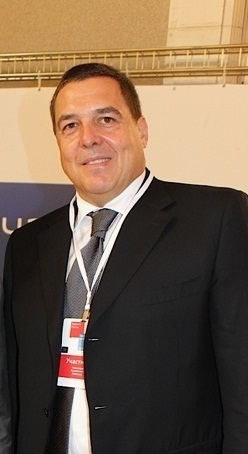
- Lyubimov in 2012
- Born: 23 June 1962 (age 64); Moscow, Russian Soviet Federative Socialist Republic
- Education: MGIMO
- Aleksandr Lyubimov's voice Lyubimov on the Echo of Moscow program, 6 September 2007

Alexander Mikhailovich Lyubimov (Russian: Алекса́ндр Миха́йлович Люби́мов; born June 23, 1962) is a Soviet and Russian television journalist, producer and presenter. He was one of the founders an independent television company VID (17.14%). Director General of the TV company VID (1995-1997), General Director of RBC TV (2011-2014), vice-president of the Russian Television Academy.

== Biography ==
Born in Moscow June 23, 1962. Son of the famous spy Mikhail Lyubimov and actress Ekaterina Vishnevskaya.

In 1976 he joined the Komsomol.

In 1984 he graduated from the MGIMO (Department of International Economic Relations). He speaks English, French and Danish.

From 1985 to 1987 he worked for the international service Radio and Television in the Nordic division.

In 1987 he moved to television a correspondent, and then leading the program Vzglyad, 1991 an A View from the Underground. In the book The Beatles of Perestroika told that Lyubimov first of the leading program private car appeared. Even 10 years later, Ogonyok positioned as the leading national heroes.

From February to August 1992 he served as Director of International Programs and Studios video sharing RGTRK Ostankino.

In March 1995, after the death of Vladislav Listyev, he took the post of Director-General of the television appearance.

Since 1998, member of the Russian Television Academy. At the present time is its vice president.

In March 1998, he was released from the post of head of news broadcasts ORT.

Since November 1998 to June 2001 - author and host of a daily political interview program Here and Now (ORT).

In 2001 – 2003 years - the first Deputy General Director of Channel One Russia.

Since 2001 - producer of the project, Last Hero.

October 5, on December 28, 2008 led RTR television project Name of Russia.

In August 2011, he left the VGTRK, becoming a member of political party Right Cause. In November of the same year he left the party and headed RBC TV channel.

October 27, 2012 elected a member of the Federal Committee of the political party Civic Platform.

December 10, 2014 left the post of General Director of RBC TV, while he remained on the board.

== Awards ==
- Order of Honour (2000)
- Order of Friendship (2006)
