= Vzglyad (Russian TV program) =

Russian television series, 1987 to 2001

- Original Vzglyad hosts, L-R: Alexander Lyubimov, Vlad Listyev and Dmitry Zakharov
- Взгляд
- Genre: Infotainment
- Created by: Anatoly Lysenko; Anatoly Malkin; Kyra Proshutinskaya; Eduard Sagalaev
- Directed by: Andrey Rasbash; Anatoly Malkin; Ivan Demidov
- Opening theme: Brand New by Tatsuhiko Arakawa
- Country of origin: Soviet Union (1987—1991) Russia (1994—2001)
- Original language: Russian

Production
- Production locations: Moscow, Ostankino TV Center, ASB-4 Riga
- Running time: 60 minutes
- Production companies: Soviet Central Television; VID

Original release
- Network: Programme One (1987-1991); 1st channel Ostankino (1994-1995); ORT (1995-2001)
- Release: 2 October 1987 – 23 April 2001

Vzglyad (Russian: Взгляд, lit. 'Outlook') was a popular Russian TV program, officially broadcast from 2 October 1987 to April 2001. It was one of the first programs that changed Russian notions on television. It was also one of the main programs of the television company VID. Vlad Listyev was one of the creators and the first hosts of Vzglyad. Yevgeny Dodolev was the regular contributor to the program and one of the hosts.

== The beginning ==
In 1975, the staff of the Youth Editorial Office of the Central Television Station (Anatoly Lysenko, Eduard Sagalaev, Anatoly Malkin, Kira Proshutinskaya) came up with the idea of a program called "In our kitchen after 11," which would include a discussion of current news in simple and understandable language to the people in decorations stylized as a kitchen. The idea was not approved by the then leadership, and the idea was returned only 12 years later, when in April 1987, at a meeting of the Central Committee of the CPSU, a closed decision was made to create a youth Friday evening program. The decision was made by Alexander Yakovlev, Secretary of the Central Committee of the CPSU for ideology, after completing the practice of jamming foreign radio stations in the USSR and in view of the desire to attract a young audience to television screens in the late evening.

== One of the symbols of Glasnost ==
Vzglyad became one of the symbols of perestroika. It shook up the late 80’s Soviet public notion of TV broadcasting and journalism in general. The program showed young hosts wearing informal clothing, live broadcasting and used popular music videos as music breaks. All of that was completely opposite to what an average Soviet viewer had been used to—strictly rehearsed and censored programs. Vzglyad was widely known and discussed by society and media. It was especially popular among urban youth who represented the interests of the new generation, a generation that wanted change. Usually, hosts invited guests, such as popular political figures or celebrities, and discussed present-day social issues.

Russian journalist Vladimir Mukusev emphasized that the program’s strong side wasn’t the hosts but the guests. He once said in an interview that Vzglyad is not only a story because it influenced the government’s decision-making process. For example, for the first time the first legal Soviet millionaire Artyom Tarasov was shown to public within the walls of Vzglyad's studio. A discussion of high prices for party membership cards let to a grand scandal which, in its turn, led to enactment which created the legal basis for the country's transition to a multi-structural economy and a real market.

== TV program ban ==
The scandal broke out on December 26, 1990, when the leadership of the USSR State Television and Radio Station banned the airing of the New Year's edition of Vzglyad. Leonid Kravchenko, Chairman of the USSR State Television and Radio Broadcasting Company, motivated the ban by the undesirability of discussing the resignation of USSR Foreign Minister Eduard Shevardnadze. On January 10, 1991, the First Deputy Chairman of Gosteleradio of the USSR signed an order suspending production.

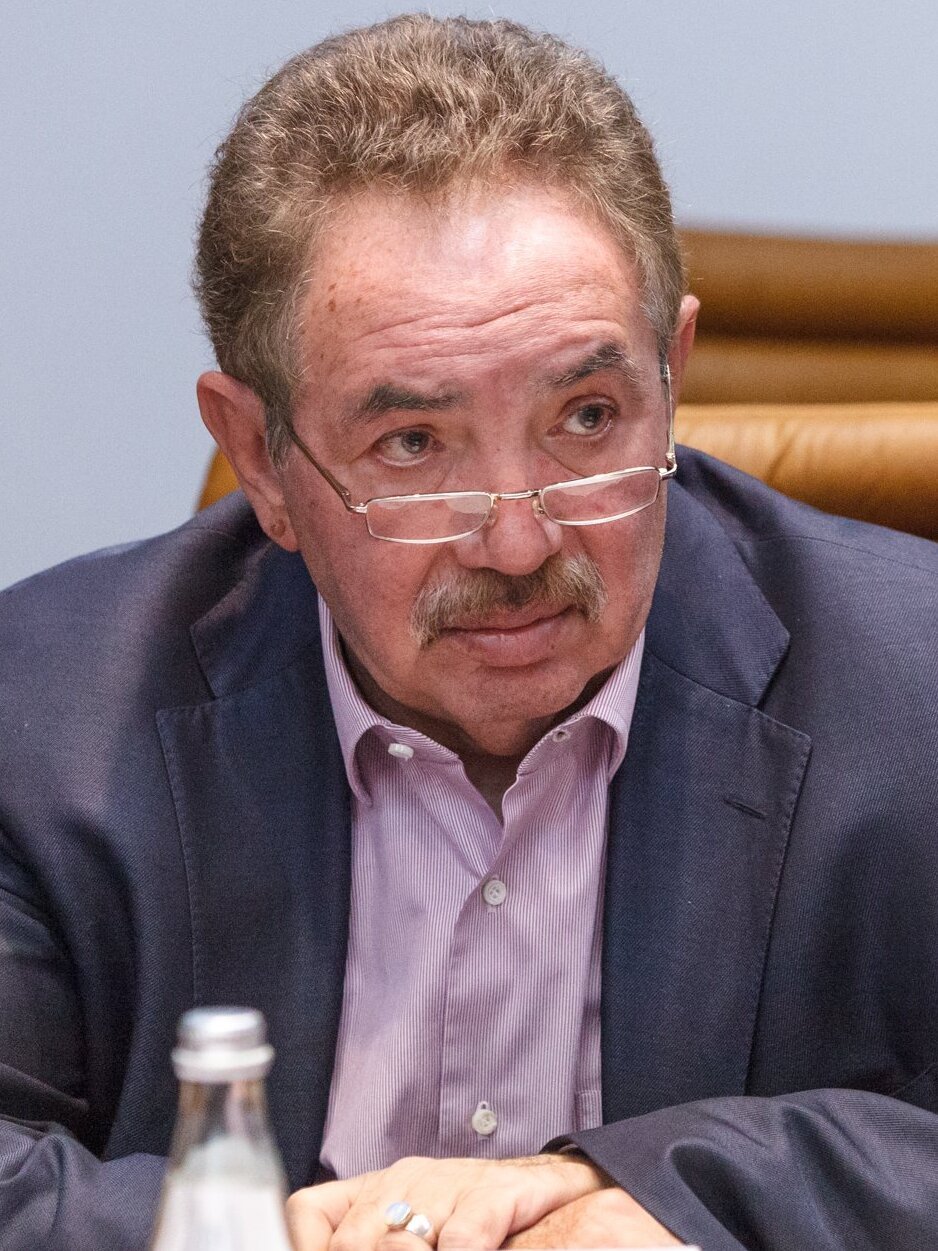
Sagalaev

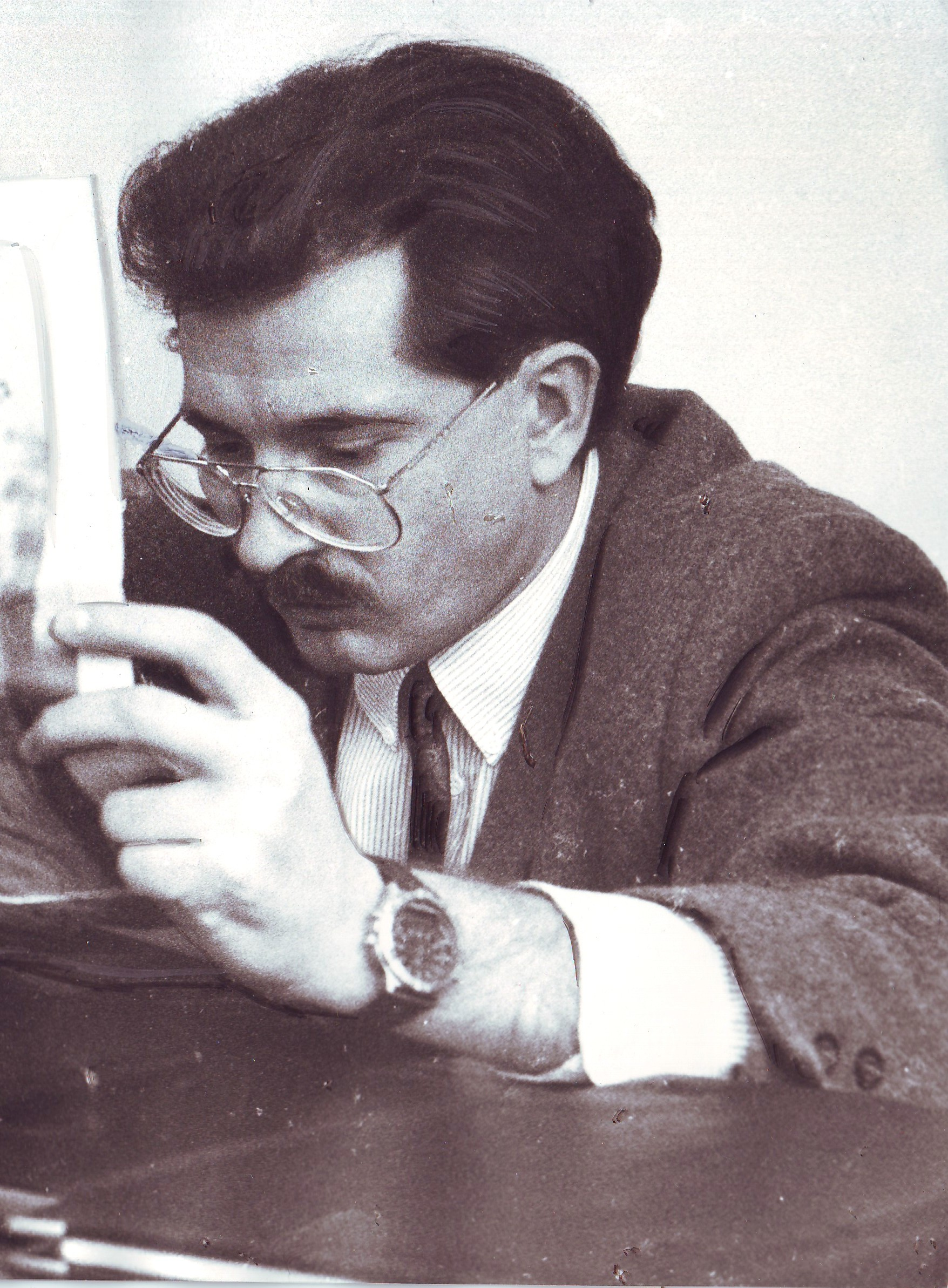
Listyev

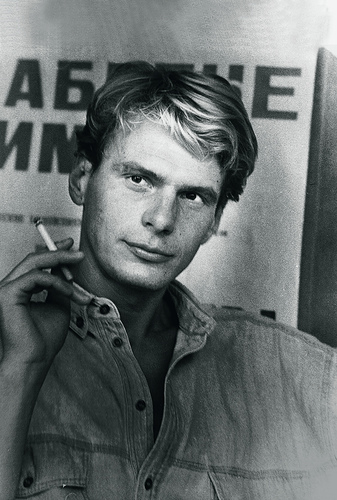
Dodolev

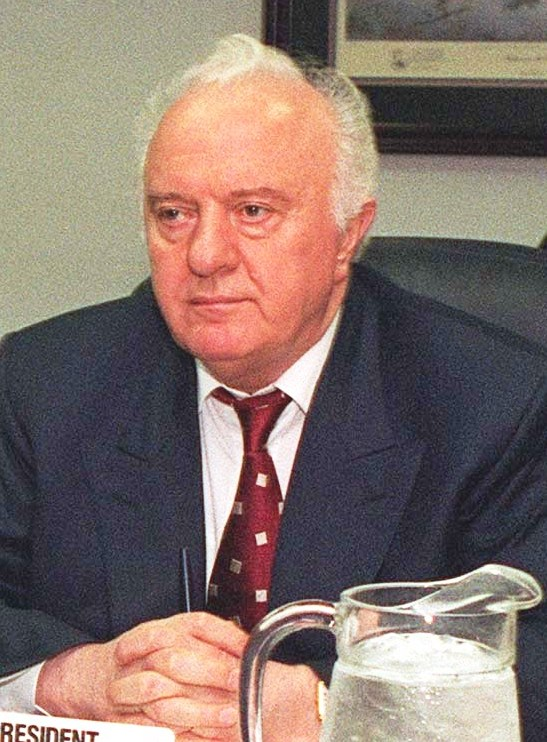
Shevardnadze

On February 26, 1991, a demonstration in defense of Glasnost was held in front of the Moscow Hotel with the participation of "Vzglyad members", which gathered half a million participants.

== Variations ==
The format and success of Vzglyad inspired adaptations and variations in other Soviet republics and post-Soviet states. In Latvian SSR, the program Labvakar (Good Evening!) premiered on January 31, 1988, on Latvian Television (LTV). Following Vzglyad's model, Labvakar addressed social and political issues while subtly challenging Soviet censorship. It became a significant platform for pro-independence sentiment, contributing to Latvia's movement toward sovereignty. Labvakar became a trusted source of alternative information, garnering significant public support. The show’s popularity protected it from complete suppression, as it resonated with growing nationalist sentiments. By exposing Soviet injustices and promoting transparency, it contributed to the eventual restoration of Latvia’s independence on May 4, 1990.
