= Weakest Link (disambiguation) =

Weakest Link is a game show franchise, which has appeared in the following versions:

== Television ==
- Weakest Link (Australian game show)
- Weakest Link (Finland)
- Weakest Link (Germany)
- Weakest Link (Hong Kong game show)
- Weakest Link (India)
- Weakest Link (Irish game show)
- Weakest Link (New Zealand game show)
- Weakest Link (Poland)
- Weakest Link (Russia)
- The Weakest Link (British game show), the original British series
- Weakest Link (American game show), the American version produced by NBC and first syndicated version

== Music ==
- "Weakest Link" (song), a 2024 diss track aimed at Quavo by Chris Brown

== Other uses ==
- The Weakest Link (video game), a 2001 video game based on the TV show
