= Weakest Link =

British television game show

The Weakest Link
- Created by: Fintan Coyle; Cathy Dunning
- Original work: Weakest Link (United Kingdom)
- Years: 2000–present

Films and television
- Television series: Weakest Link (independent international versions, see below)

Games
- Video game(s): Weakest Link (2001)

Miscellaneous
- Genre: Game show
- First aired: 14 August 2000; 26 years ago
- Distributor: BBC Studios

Weakest Link (also known as The Weakest Link) is a television game show which first appeared in the United Kingdom on BBC Two on 14 August 2000 and originally ended on 31 March 2012, when its host Anne Robinson finished her contract. The original British version of the show is still broadcast domestically on Challenge. The game begins with a team of seven, eight or nine contestants who take turns answering general knowledge questions within a time limit to create chains of correct answers in a row. At the end of each round, the players vote one contestant, "The Weakest Link", out of the game. Once two players are left, they play in a head-to-head contest, with five questions asked to each contestant in turn, to determine the winner.

The format has been licensed across the world, with many countries producing their own series of the programme and is the second most popular international franchise, behind only the Who Wants to Be a Millionaire? franchise, which also originated from the United Kingdom.

== Format ==
The programme sees a group of contestants ranging from five to nine players who will need to work as a team to try to win as much as possible of a maximum cash jackpot by correctly answering general-knowledge questions in a series of rapid-fire rounds.

Each round features a money chain of anywhere from five to nine increasing cash values, with a maximum cash target that the team must attempt to reach within a time limit. Questions are asked of the team members sequentially. In the first round, play will typically start with the first player alphabetically or by a random-draw before the game starts. The team can most quickly achieve the target by stringing together a chain of consecutive correct answers, the minimum number of which depends on the number of "links" in the money chain, usually but not always the same as the number of contestants at the start of the show. A correct answer increases the value of the succeeding question, while an incorrect answer breaks the chain, losing all money accumulated in that chain. A contestant can secure the accumulated money in the chain by saying "Bank" before their question is asked, some versions require the contestant to wait to bank until their name is called; doing so however resets the chain to zero and the team must rebuild again. The round ends when the team has either run out of time or banked the target, in which case the round ends prematurely. The target amount is the maximum amount available in the round. If the team banks a total exceeding this amount, it is rounded down to the maximum amount. Only the money that has been banked is taken forward in the game, forming the total prize money available at the end. In the event the host is in the middle of a question when time runs out, the question is abandoned; however, if the question is completely asked before time runs out, the correct answer is announced, whether or not the contestant answered it correctly.

Each round ends with the team voting off one person from the game. Before the votes are revealed, a voice-over announcer reveals who statistically is the Strongest Link and Weakest Link, determined by how many questions were answered correctly and incorrectly, the amount of money banked and lost, and the total monetary value of the questions asked. The votes are then revealed, followed by inquiry by the host for the reasoning behind the vote, along with berating of the contestants. The person with the most votes is named the Weakest Link regardless of the statistics, is eliminated from the game, and wins nothing. In the event of a tie, the Strongest Link is immediately deemed immune from the vote only if they are one of them and must break the tie; if one of the two-way tie is the Strongest Link, the other one is automatically eliminated.

This process repeats, with each successive round beginning with the Strongest Link from the last round, or the second-Strongest Link, if the Strongest Link was voted off, and the time limit available to them decreasing usually by 10 or 15 seconds. Once there are two players remaining, they play one final round, where the money banked is multiplied by a certain amount. In some versions, however, the game has gone straight to the head-to-head finale after the final elimination.

The final two contestants then compete in a head-to-head round to determine the winner, with the Strongest Link from the last round determining who begins the round. The contestants are alternately asked a series of five questions each. The player who correctly answers the most wins the money accumulated in the game. The head-to-head round can conclusively end; for example, player A answered the first three questions correctly, player B answered the first three questions incorrectly, then it can come to a conclusion that even if player B answered the last two questions correctly and player A answered the last two questions incorrectly, player A is conclusively the winner. If there is a draw, the game continues to sudden death, where the first to answer a question correctly over their opponent's incorrect answer wins. The loser, like all other contestants prior, goes home with nothing.

== Game rule and format variations ==
Compared with the original format, the others have some changes, making them not the same as the original.

=== Host ===
In the UK original series, the host was Anne Robinson. Producers chose her with the intention of being both firm to the contestants yet understanding when a contestant gets voted off. However, in producing the show, Robinson began to act cold and harsh towards the contestants. Some early international hosts like Chazia Mourali, Montserrat Ontiveros, Andrei Gheorghe, Neena Gupta, Hülya Uğur Tanrıöver, Fiona Coyne, Goedele Liekens, Laurence Boccolini, and Trine Gregorius went to the BBC Studio for instruction and training purpose (meeting the UK production team and Anne Robinson) to replicate the presenting style.

Even with the 'Weakest Link bible' BBC Worldwide (the format distributor of Weakest Link) still completely in place, fairly soon some international version would show examples of hosting styles other than the firm, cold manner the original format started out with. Then gradually, hosts adapted their own style of presenting. As a result, some international hosts are nicer and more relaxed to the contestants. The first notable example was seen on the 2001-2002 Hong Kong version hosted by Carol Cheng who took on a friendly face as soon as BBC staff had left production after only a handful of episodes in the Summer of 2001. The second, internationally more well-known example would be George Gray's tenure as host in the 2002–03 syndicated version of the American edition. However, it wasn't until Anne Robinson had stepped down as the host of the original British version that more and more countries started local versions (or reboots) where the hosts of the show were nicer. Examples were France (2014–15), Turkey (2015, 2019), Finland (2017–18), Cyprus (2017–21), the Netherlands (2019–20), Greece (2019–23), Australia (2021–22), the United States (2020–, although the hosting attitude of Jane Lynch was more so that of sarcasm, and snarky – reminiscent of her noted Sue Sylvester character from Glee), and the United Kingdom (2021–).

Bridget Maasland, host of the short-lived reboot of the Dutch version (2019-2020), became the first host worldwide not to wear black clothing on every episode. Although she did wear dark and black suits on about half of the shows, she often wore bright coloured outfits on the other episodes. Her style of hosting somewhat resembles the style Anne Robinson adapted in the later UK shows (post 2005), asking contestants more about their private lives, letting them sing and dance during the voting and talk about more than just the mistakes made. The second host wearing more colourful clothes was Turkish presenter İpek Altınbaşak-Farina in the flopped revival of En Zayif Halka in 2019. Russian host Maria Kiseleva was the third host to wear bright (she would wear light-blue or white on the 2020-23 revival and in the 2023 unlicensed Na vykhod!.

=== American version ===
==== Syndicated ====
From the second season of the syndicated version in the United States, after the penultimate round, the last two contestants do not face the clock and the money tree. Instead, the remaining two contestants go straight into the head-to-head round. In the event the Strongest Link is voted off, the Second-Strongest Link decides who goes first.

==== 2020 revival ====
Unlike the original version, the top prize money available increases after each round. The top prize money starts at $25,000 in round 1 and increases by $25,000 per round until round 4. The top prize money in rounds 5 and 6 are set at $250,000 and $500,000, respectively.

A minor addition to the game is that of a buzzer added to each contestant's podium. This is used both to bank money (with contestants not only having to say the word "bank" before being asked the question but must also press the buzzer), as well as to reveal the contestant's vote.

If the team reaches the target but hasn't banked (already reached or exceeded it on the chain), the round ends immediately with no need to bank once the question necessary to achieve the target has been answered.

Some non-gameplay variations were also adapted to the revived series: the contestants no longer handwrite their votes, rather they vote via a touch screen panel, tapping the button of the player they wish to vote off. This screen is also used to present visual information for visual questions – where the host will ask the contestants to identify items that appear on the screen. Additionally, the host will discuss the contestants' mistakes before the vote reveals – with the weakest link being eliminated immediately after the vote reveal. Like season 2 of the syndicated version, once only two contestants remain the game goes straight to the head-to-head round.

Changes from this version were featured in the 2021 Australian version – with the top prize being $250,000 and the prize increases for each round being as follows ($10,000, $15,000, $20,000, $30,000, $75,000, $100,000).

Although many have come close, the only person to play a perfect game in the 2020 revival was a woman named Kaya in Season 1 Episode 7. She got all 18 of her questions correct during regular play and then 7 correct in the final round (2 were in Sudden Death). She won $67,500.

=== French version ===
The first reboot of the French version (aired from 2014 to 2015) also does not use the clock and money tree for the final round, and in the penultimate round is the 3-player triple stake round for €15,000 and lasts 90 seconds.

=== Dutch version ===
On the daily Dutch version that started in May 2019, just like on the latest French version, round 8 was cut from the format as from the first week of airing. Instead, in round 7, the money triples, and one last player is eliminated after that round. Making the top prize money no longer €10,000, but €9,000. After that, the remaining two contestants go straight into the head-to-head round. However, in the 2nd series, the number of contestants dropped to 7. The top prize money decreased to €8,000, and the 90-second round returned.

== International versions ==
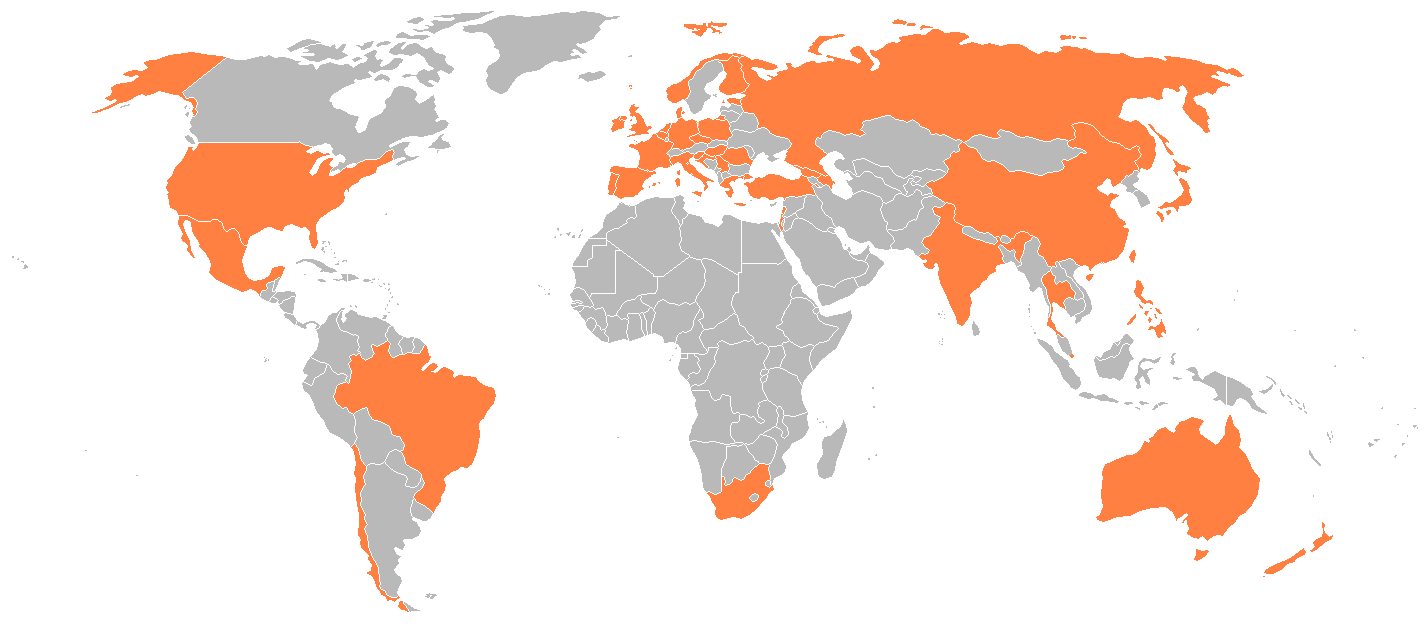
Countries that have produced their own version

The format is currently distributed by BBC Studios, the commercial arm of the BBC, following their merger with BBC Worldwide and also is produced by different production companies. Australia was the 1st country to adapt the format; not all the international versions share the same title as UK.

As with the original British version, all of the hosts wear black clothing (or sometimes dark colours with black). Most versions also have disciplinarian female hosts, again similar to the British original—with exceptions being Babken Chobanyan (Armenia), Fausto Silva (Brazil), Tasos Tryfonos (Cyprus and Greece), Julien Courbet, Vincent Dedienne and Olivier Minne (France), Riku Nieminen (Finland), Nikolai Fomenko (Russia, 2007-2008), Eamon Dunphy (Ireland), Edu Manzano, Allan K. (both Philippines), Shirō Itō (Japan), Pedro Granger (Portugal), Enrico Papi (Italy), Nikola Kojo (Serbia, 2023-2025), Tseng Yang Qing (Taiwan), Baybars Altuntaş (Turkey), George Gray (United States) and Romesh Ranganathan (United Kingdom, 2021 till now). Gray, Courbet, Ranganathan, and Nieminen are comedians, and those versions were designed to play off comedy.

In May 2010, the Croatian adaptation reached its 1,008th episode; the British original is the only version to have reached as many episodes.

Legend:

Currently airing No longer airing Unsold pilot Future version

Country	Local title	Host	TV station	Top prize	Catchphrase	Catchphrase Translation	First episode	Last episode
Arab world	الحلقة الأضعف; Elhalka Eladaaf	Rita Khoury	Future Television	$16,000	أنت الحلقة الأضعف ، الله معك	You are the Weakest Link. May God be with you.	14 October 2001	April 2003
Armenia	Թույլ օղակ Tuyl oghak	Babken Chobanyan	AMPTV	֏2,000,000	Դուք ամենաթույլ օղակն եք. Ցտեսություն։	You are the Weakest Link. Goodbye!	30 March 2024	20 July 2025
Armenia	Թույլ օղակ Tuyl oghak	Anita Hakhverdyan	AMPTV	֏2,000,000	Դուք ամենաթույլ օղակն եք. Ցտեսություն։	You are the Weakest Link. Goodbye!	30 March 2024	20 July 2025
Australia	The Weakest Link	Cornelia Frances	Seven Network	$100,000	You are the Weakest Link. Goodbye!		5 February 2001	22 April 2002
Australia	The Weakest Link	Magda Szubanski	Nine Network	$250,000	You are the Weakest Link. Goodbye!		25 May 2021	1 February 2022
Azerbaijan	Zəif bənd	Kamila Babayeva	Lider TV	45,000,000m (2004–05); 9,000₼ (2006–07)	Ən zəif bənd sizsiniz. Xudahafiz!	You are the weakest link. Goodbye!	May 2004	April 2007
Azerbaijan	Zəif bənd	Solmaz Süleymanlı	Lider TV	9,000₼	Ən zəif bənd sizsiniz. Xudahafiz!	You are the weakest link. Goodbye!	3 March 2012	2014
Belgium (Flanders)	De zwakste schakel	Goedele Liekens	VTM	fr. 2,000,000	Jij bent de zwakste schakel. Salut!	You are the weakest link. Goodbye!	29 August 2001	December 2001
Brazil	Ponto fraco	Fausto Silva	TV Globo	R$1,000,000			2001 (Pilots rejected by BBC)	
Chile	El rival más débil	Catalina Pulido	Canal 13	$40,000,000	Tú eres el rival más débil. ¡Adiós!	You are the weakest rival. Goodbye!	31 March 2004	August 2004
China	汰弱留强·智者为王; Tài ruò liú qiáng·zhìzhě wéi wáng	Chen Luyu	Syndicated	¥200,000	你被淘汰啦，再见!	You are eliminated, goodbye!	9 February 2002	2004
China	智者为王; Zhìzhě wéi wáng	Shen Bing	Nanjing TV	¥200,000	你被淘汰啦，再见!	You are eliminated, goodbye!	9 February 2002	2004
China	智者为王; Zhìzhě wéi wáng	Xia Qing	Nanjing TV	¥200,000	你被淘汰啦，再见!	You are eliminated, goodbye!	9 February 2002	2004
Croatia	Najslabija karika	Nina Violić	HRT 1	kn 90,000	Vi ste najslabija karika. Doviđenja!	You are the weakest link. Goodbye!	26 April 2004	31 May 2010
Croatia	Najslabija karika	Daniela Trbović	HRT 1	kn 90,000	Vi ste najslabija karika. Zbogom!	You are the weakest link. Goodbye!	26 April 2004	31 May 2010
Croatia	Najslabija karika	Mirko Fodor	HRT 1	kn 90,000	Vi ste najslabija karika. Zbogom!	You are the weakest link. Goodbye!	26 April 2004	31 May 2010
Cyprus	Ο Πιο Αδύναμος Κρίκος; O Pio Adynamos Krikos	Tasos Tryfonos	RIK 1	€5,000	Είστε ο πιο αδύναμος κρίκος, Λυπάμαι πολύ!	You are the Weakest Link! and I'm sorry for you!	18 September 2017	6 March 2021
Czech Republic	Nejslabší! Máte padáka!	Zuzana Slavíková	TV Nova	Kč 1,000,000	Jste Nejslabší, a máte padáka!	You are the weakest, and you're fired!	15 February 2002	1 July 2004
Denmark	Det svageste led	Trine Gregorius	DR1	kr. 200,000	Du er det svageste led, farvel!	You are the weakest link, goodbye!	2003	2003
Estonia	Nõrgim lüli	Tuuli Roosma	Kanal 2	kr 80,000	Sina oled nõrgim lüli, head aega!	You are the Weakest Link, goodbye!	5 September 2004	18 July 2005
Finland	Heikoin lenkki	Kirsi Salo	MTV3	€15,000 €16,000 €18,000	Sinä olet heikoin lenkki, hyvästi!	You are the weakest link, goodbye!	6 September 2002	18 February 2005
Finland	Heikoin lenkki	Riku Nieminen	Nelonen	€20,000	Sinä olet heikoin lenkki, hyvästi!	You are the weakest link, goodbye!	20 March 2017	21 May 2018
France	Le maillon faible	Laurence Boccolini	TF1	F 150,000 (2001) €20,000 (2002–03) €50,000 (2003–07)	Vous êtes le maillon faible, au revoir!	You are the weak link, goodbye!	9 July 2001	12 August 2007
France	Le maillon faible	Julien Courbet	D8	€45,000	Vous êtes le maillon faible, au revoir!	You are the weak link, goodbye!	8 September 2014	22 July 2015
France	Le maillon faible	Vincent Dedienne	M6	€57,500	Vous êtes le maillon faible, au revoir!	You are the weak link, goodbye!	16 October 2024	
France	Le maillon faible	Olivier Minne	M6	€40,000	Vous êtes le maillon faible, au revoir!	You are the weak link, goodbye!	29 November 2025	
Georgia	სუსტი რგოლი Susti rgoli	Nino Burduli	Rustavi 2	₾8,000	თქვენ სუსტი რგოლი ხართ, და ამიტომ ტოვებთ პროექტს!	You are the Weakest Link, that why you are leaving now!	17 January 2005	2005
Germany	Der Schwächste fliegt!	Sonja Zietlow	RTL	DM50,000 (2001)	Du bist der Schwächste, du fliegst, und tschüss!	You are the weakest, you're kicked off, and goodbye!	19 March 2001	23 February 2002
Germany	Der Schwächste fliegt!	Sonja Zietlow	RTL	€50,000 (2002)	Du bist der Schwächste, du fliegst, und tschüss!	You are the weakest, you're kicked off, and goodbye!	19 March 2001	23 February 2002
Greece	Ο Πιο Αδύναμος Κρίκος; O Pio Adynamos Krikos	Elena Akrita	MEGA	₯5,000,000	Είστε ο πιο αδύναμος κρίκος, Λυπάμαι πολύ!	You are the weakest link. I'm sorry for you!	27 October 2001	15 February 2003
Greece	Ο Πιο Αδύναμος Κρίκος; O Pio Adynamos Krikos	Elena Akrita	MEGA	€15,000	Είστε ο πιο αδύναμος κρίκος, Λυπάμαι πολύ!	You are the weakest link. I'm sorry for you!	27 October 2001	15 February 2003
Greece	Ο Πιο Αδύναμος Κρίκος; O Pio Adynamos Krikos	Tasos Tryfonos	Skai TV	€10,000	Είστε ο πιο αδύναμος κρίκος, Λυπάμαι πολύ!	You are the weakest link. I'm sorry for you!	21 September 2019	24 July 2022
Greece	Ο Πιο Αδύναμος Κρίκος; O Pio Adynamos Krikos	Tasos Tryfonos	ERT1	€10,000	Είστε ο πιο αδύναμος κρίκος, Λυπάμαι πολύ!	You are the weakest link. I'm sorry for you!	12 September 2022	12 May 2023
Greece	Ο Πιο Αδύναμος Κρίκος; O Pio Adynamos Krikos	Maria Bakodimou	Open TV	€10,000	Είστε ο πιο αδύναμος κρίκος, Γειά σας!	You are the Weakest Link, bye-bye!	2 March 2026	19 June 2026
Greece	Ο Πιο Αδύναμος Κρίκος; O Pio Adynamos Krikos	Tasos Dousis	Open TV	€10,000	Είστε ο πιο αδύναμος κρίκος, Γειά σας!	You are the Weakest Link, bye-bye!	3 October 2026	
Hong Kong	一筆OUT消; Jat1 bat1 OUT siu1	Carol Cheng	TVB Jade	HK$3,000,000	你係眾望所歸，無得留低，你要一筆OUT消, Goodbye!	You had been eliminated and leave as expected. You are the Weakest Link, Goodbye!	20 August 2001	18 January 2002
Hungary	A leggyengébb láncszem	Krisztina Máté	TV2	Ft 3,000,000	Ön a leggyengébb láncszem, viszlát!	You are the weakest link, goodbye!	12 August 2001	May 2002
Hungary	Nincs kegyelem	Krisztina Máté	TV2	Ft 6,000,000	Ön a leggyengébb láncszem, viszlát!	You are the weakest link, goodbye!	12 August 2001	May 2002
India	Kamzor Kadii Kaun	Neena Gupta	Star Plus	Rs. 25,00,000/-	Aap is round ke kamzor kadii hain. Aap jaa sakte hain. Namaste!	You are the weakest link in this round, you can leave now, goodbye!	25 December 2001	21 May 2002
Ireland	The Weakest Link	Eamon Dunphy	TV3	€10,000	You are the Weakest Link. Goodbye!		17 September 2001	July 2002
Israel	החוליה החלשה; HaChulia HaChalasha	Pnina Dvorin	Channel 10	₪100,000	!אתה החוליה החלשה, שלום	You are the weakest link, goodbye!	31 January 2002	23 August 2004
Israel	החוליה החלשה; HaChulia HaChalasha	Hana Laszlo	Channel 10	₪80,000	!אתה החוליה החלשה, שלום	You are the weakest link, goodbye!	31 January 2002	23 August 2004
Italy	Anello debole	Enrico Papi	Italia 1	€15,000/₤29,044,050	Lei è l'Anello Debole, se ne vada!	You are the weakest link, leave!	29 October 2001	17 November 2001
Japan	The Weakest Link ウィーケストリンク☆一人勝ちの法則; Uikesutorinku: Hitori-gachi no Hosoku	Shirō Itō	Fuji Television	¥16,000,000	ウィーケストリンクと決定しました。__君、退場!	You have been voted as the Weakest Link. __, Leave!	8 April 2002	16 September 2002
Mexico	El rival más débil	Montserrat Ontiveros	Azteca Trece	$200,000	Tú eres el rival más débil. ¡Adiós!	You are the weakest rival. Goodbye!	2 August 2003	27 September 2009
Mexico	El rival más débil	Lolita Cortés	Azteca Trece	$200,000	Tú eres el rival más débil, te vas.	You are the weakest rival. You Leave!	27 July 2013	27 December 2014
Netherlands	De zwakste schakel	Chazia Mourali	RTL 4	€10,000	Je bent de zwakste schakel, tot ziens!	You are the Weakest Link. Goodbye!	6 May 2001	28 August 2004
Netherlands	De zwakste schakel	Bridget Maasland	RTL 4	€10,000 (2019) €8,000 (2020)	Je bent de zwakste schakel, dag!	You are the Weakest Link. Bye!	6 May 2019	March 2020
New Zealand	The Weakest Link	Louise Wallace	TVNZ 1	$20,000	You are the Weakest Link. Goodbye!		17 July 2001	March 2002
North Macedonia	Најслаба алка Najslaba alka	Zivkica Kalenikova	Alfa TV	ден 320,000	Вие сте Најслабата алка, збогум!	You are the Weakest Link. Goodbye!	3 May 2010	July 2011
Norway	Det svakeste ledd	Anne Grosvold	NRK1	kr. 200,000	Du er det svakeste ledd, adjø!	You are the Weakest Link. Goodbye!	30 August 2004	6 December 2004
Philippines	The Weakest Link	Edu Manzano	IBC	₱1,000,000	You are the Weakest Link. Goodbye!		15 October 2001	October 2002
Philippines	The Weakest Link	Allan K.	IBC	₱1,000,000	You are the Weakest Link. Goodbye!		15 October 2001	October 2002
Poland	Najsłabsze ogniwo	Kazimiera Szczuka	TVN	zł27,000	Jesteś najsłabszym ogniwem, do widzenia!	You are the Weakest Link. Goodbye!	1 March 2004	22 December 2005
Portugal	O elo mais fraco	Julia Pinheiro	RTP1	€10,000	Você é o elo mais fraco, adeus!	You are the Weakest Link, goodbye!	11 June 2002	2003
Portugal	O elo mais fraco	Luisa Castel-Branco	RTP1	€10,000	Você é o elo mais fraco, adeus!	You are the Weakest Link, goodbye!	11 June 2002	2003
Portugal	O elo mais fraco	Pedro Granger	RTP1	€10,000	Você é o elo mais fraco, adeus!	You are the Weakest Link, goodbye!	19 September 2011	25 May 2012
Romania	Lanțul slăbiciunilor	Andrei Gheorghe	Pro TV	L500,000,000	Ești veriga cea mai slabă din lanțul slăbiciunilor. La revedere, Drum bun!	You are the weakest link in Chain of Weakness. Goodbye and have a nice day!	13 October 2001	2002
Russia	Слабое звено Slaboye zveno	Mariya Kiselyova; Leonid Yakubovich (25 December 2002)	ORT/Channel One	₽300,000 (25 September – 30 October 2001) ₽400,000 (1 November 2001 – October 2004) ₽350,000 (October 2004 – 2 July 2005) ₽1,000,000 (celebrity editions, 2001–2004)	Вы самое слабое звено, прощайте!	You are the Weakest Link. Goodbye!	25 September 2001	2 July 2005
Russia	Слабое звено Slaboye zveno	Nikolai Fomenko	Channel 5	₽350,000	Вы самое слабое звено, прощайте!	You are the Weakest Link. Goodbye!	2 December 2007	28 December 2008
Russia	Слабое звено Slaboye zveno	Mariya Kiselyova	Mir	₽320,000 (14 February – 5 November 2020) ₽400,000 (13 November 2020 – 13 January 2023)	Вы самое слабое звено, прощайте!	You are the Weakest Link. Goodbye!	14 February 2020	13 January 2023
Serbia	Najslabija karika	Sandra Lalatović	BKTV	din 5,000,000	Vi ste najslabija karika. Doviđenja!	You are the weakest link. Goodbye!	September 2003	April 2006
Serbia	Najslabija karika	Nikola Kojo	Prva TV	din 5,000,000	Vi ste najslabija karika. Doviđenja!	You are the weakest link. Goodbye!	21 March 2023	3 June 2025
Singapore	智者生存; Zhizhe Shengcun	Yvette Cui (Cui Lixin)	Mediacorp Channel 8	S$100,000	你是最弱一環,再見!	You are the Weakest Link. Goodbye!	19 May 2002	2003
Singapore	The Weakest Link	Asha Gill	Mediacorp Channel 5	S$1,000,000	You have been voted the Weakest Link. Goodbye!		27 October 2002	2003
Slovenia	Najšibkejši člen	Violeta Tomič	SLO 1	SIT 2,400,000	Vi ste Najšibkejši člen! Adijo!	You are the Weakest Link, Goodbye!	3 October 2003	25 November 2005
South Africa	The Weakest Link	Fiona Coyne	SABC3	R 50,000 (2003–04)	You are the Weakest Link. Goodbye!		3 September 2003	27 October 2007
South Africa	The Weakest Link	Fiona Coyne	SABC3	R 100,000 (2005–07)	You are the Weakest Link. Goodbye!		3 September 2003	27 October 2007
Spain	El rival más débil	Nuria González	TVE1	€7,200	Eres el rival más débil, ¡adiós!	You are the weakest rival, goodbye!	15 May 2002	1 October 2004
Spain	El rival más débil	Karmele Aranburu	TVE1	€7,200	Eres el rival más débil, ¡adiós!	You are the weakest rival, goodbye!	15 May 2002	1 October 2004
Spain	El rival más débil	Karmele Aranburu	TVE2	€7,200	Eres el rival más débil, ¡adiós!	You are the weakest rival, goodbye!	15 May 2002	1 October 2004
Spain	El rival más débil	Luján Argüelles	Telecinco	€50,000	Eres el rival más débil, ¡adiós!	You are the weakest rival, goodbye!	4 September 2024	28 August 2025
Sweden	Svagaste länken	Kajsa Ingemarsson	Sjuan	kr 100,000	Du är den svagaste länken, hejdå!	You are the weakest link. Goodbye!	31 October 2011	2012
Taiwan	The Weakest Link 智者生存; The Weakest Link zhizhe shengcun	Belle Yu	STAR Chinese Channel	NT$320,000	你是本回合被淘汰的參賽者, goodbye!	You are person eliminated at this round, goodbye!	22 October 2001	11 February 2002
Taiwan	The Weakest Link 智者生存; The Weakest Link zhizhe shengcun	Tseng Yang Qing	STAR Chinese Channel	NT$320,000	第_回合被淘汰的是_,再見!	The person eliminated in the _th round is _, bye!	22 October 2001	11 February 2002
Thailand	The Weakest Link กำจัดจุดอ่อน; The Weakest Link Kamchat Chut On	Kritika Kongsompong	ThaiTV 3	฿1,000,000	คุณคือจุดอ่อนของทีม เชิญค่ะ	You are the weakest link of the team. Leave!	7 February 2002	26 December 2002
Turkey	En zayıf halka	Hülya Uğur Tanrıöver	Show TV	TL 50,000,000,000; TL100,000,000,000	En zayıf halka siz oldunuz, güle güle!	You are the weakest link, goodbye!	9 September 2001	14 June 2002
Turkey	En zayıf halka	Baybars Altuntaş	TV8	₺20,000	En zayıf halka siz oldunuz, güle güle!	You are the weakest link, goodbye!	21 September 2015	15 November 2015
Turkey	En zayıf halka	İpek Altınbaşak-Farina	ATV	₺80,000	En zayıf halka siz oldunuz, güle güle!	You are the weakest link, goodbye!	24 July 2019	21 September 2019
United Kingdom	The Weakest Link	Anne Robinson	BBC Two (Daytime); BBC One (Primetime)	£10,000 (Daytime) £20,000 (Primetime) £50,000 (Primetime)	You are the Weakest Link. Goodbye!		14 August 2000	31 March 2012
United Kingdom	The Weakest Link	Anne Robinson	BBC Two	£15,000	You are the Weakest Link. Goodbye!		17 November 2017	
United Kingdom	The Weakest Link	Romesh Ranganathan	BBC One	£50,000	You are the Weakest Link. Goodbye!		18 December 2021	
United Kingdom	The Weakest Link	Romesh Ranganathan	BBC Two	£10,000	You are the Weakest Link. Goodbye!		18 November 2022	
United States	The Weakest Link	Anne Robinson	NBC	$1,000,000	You are the Weakest Link. Goodbye!		16 April 2001	14 July 2002
United States	The Weakest Link	George Gray	Syndicated	$75,000	You are the Weakest Link. Goodbye!		7 January 2002	20 May 2003
United States	The Weakest Link	George Gray	Syndicated	$100,000	You are the Weakest Link. Goodbye!		7 January 2002	20 May 2003
United States	The Weakest Link	Jane Lynch	NBC	$1,000,000	You are the Weakest Link. Goodbye!		29 September 2020	10 July 2024
United States	The Weakest Link	Jane Lynch	Fox	$1,000,000	You are the Weakest Link. Goodbye!		15 September 2025	

== See also ==
- List of television game show franchises
