= Weakest Link (Hong Kong game show) =

- 一筆OUT消
- Genre: Game show
- Created by: Fintan Coyle, Cathy Dunning
- Based on: The Weakest Link
- Presented by: Carol Cheng
- Announcer: Kevin So (So Keung Man)
- Theme music composer: Paul Farrer
- Country of origin: Hong Kong
- Original language: Cantonese
- No. of episodes: 108

Production
- Production locations: Studio 6,T.V. City, 220 Clear Water Bay Road, Hong Kong
- Running time: 60 minutes per episode
- Production companies: ECM Production; Sharp-Roxy (Hong Kong) Ltd; BBC Worldwide

Original release
- Network: TVB Jade
- Release: August 20, 2001 – January 18, 2002

一筆OUT消 (Cantonese Yale: Yāt Bāt OUT Sīu) is the Hong Kong edition of the British show The Weakest Link, presented by Carol Cheng in the Cantonese language. The Chinese title of the show is a word play of Chinese idiom 一筆勾銷 (Cantonese Yale: Yāt Bāt Ngāu Sīu), which means "Written off".

== Purchase ==
The show format and production license, TVB was quickly bought from The Weakest Link International License Holder BBC Worldwide and ECM Production. Then the show started quickly to air on TVB Jade, after rival ATV took most of the ratings with the Cantonese language version of Who Wants to Be a Millionaire?. The top prize was HK$3,000,000. It premiered on August 20, 2001.

== Host ==
As per the licensing agreement, hostess Carol Cheng initially had to act just like Anne Robinson, complete with the same cold and mean style of presenting. BBC staff were present for the first five tapings, and the network and production team had to model the show after the British version. Because Chinese culture typically does not value confrontational behaviour towards people, TVB received many viewers complaints about the show. Bowing to public pressure, the broadcaster changed the style of the show, and Carol Cheng became gentler with the contestants. As a result, the ratings went up, and eventually the show beat Who Wants to be a Millionaire (albeit occasionally) in ratings. Since TVB ordered only 108 daily weekday shows, the series finale aired on January 18, 2002.

== Game play ==
The game play was identical to that of the U.S. nighttime show, with the first round lasting 2:30 and each succeeding round lasting 10 seconds less than the preceding round, until Round 7, which lasts for 90 seconds for double the stakes or a possible $750,000. The final round is a 5-question shootout in which the player who answers more questions correctly wins all the money, with "sudden death" play in the event of a tie. Unlike the British version, the first round started with the person whose first character (surname) in their Chinese name is first alphabetically. The money chain for each round is as follows (in HK$):

Question	Value
1	$3,000
2	$7,000
3	$15,000
4	$30,000
5	$75,000
6	$150,000
7	$225,000
8	$375,000
