= The Weakest Link (Taiwanese game show) =

Taiwanese television quiz show (2001–2002)

- 智者生存
- Genre: Game show
- Created by: Fintan Coyle, Cathy Dunning
- Based on: The Weakest Link
- Presented by: Belle Yu; Tseng Yang Qing
- Theme music composer: Paul Farrer
- Country of origin: Taiwan
- Original language: Mandarin
- No. of episodes: 27

Production
- Running time: 45 minutes per episode
- Production companies: Jason's Entertainment Co., Ltd; ECM Production; BBC Worldwide.

Original release
- Network: STAR Chinese Channel
- Release: October 22, 2001 – February 11, 2002

The Weakest Link 智者生存 (Weakest Link zhizhe shengcun) is the Taiwanese edition of the British show The Weakest Link, presented by Taiwanese actress and reality host Belle Yu, who was later replaced by Taiwanese author Tseng Yang Qing. The Chinese title of the show is a word play of Chinese idiom 智者生存, which means "Wise man survival".

== Game play ==
The first round lasting 3:00 and each following round lasting 10 seconds less than the preceding round, until Round 7, which lasts for 2 minutes, for triple the stakes or a possible NT$120,000. The final round is a 5-question shootout in which the player who answers more questions correctly wins all the money, with "sudden death" play in the event of a tie.

== Special episode ==
The show aired one celebrity special in January 2002, the celebrity contestants were playing for charity. The charity went to the Children's Burn Fund of the Republic of China, so the children will have a happy Christmas. In the eighth position, former host Belle Yu also made an appearance in the celebrity special, who originally hosted the show before Tseng Yang Qing.

== Money tree ==
Question	Price (NT$)
8	40,000
7	30,000
6	22,500
5	15,000
4	10,000
3	5,000
2	2,500
1	1,000
