= The Weakest Link (South African game show) =

South African television quiz show (2003–2007)

- Presented by: Fiona Coyne
- Country of origin: South Africa
- No. of seasons: 5
- No. of episodes: 110

Original release
- Network: SABC 3
- Release: 2003 – 2007

Related
- The Weakest Link

The Weakest Link is a South African game show based on the original version in the United Kingdom. It was broadcast on SABC 3 and was hosted by actress and playwright Fiona Coyne.

Five seasons were broadcast between 2003 and 2007, each with 22 episodes. Two additional seasons were commissioned by SABC in 2009, though they were cancelled due to the station's internal issues.

The show featured nine contestants competing for a top prize of R50,000. It was filmed in Johannesburg.

Coyne beat 500 hopefuls to get the hosting role, and flew to the United Kingdom to train with Anne Robinson, the host of the original British version. Her appearance, hair, dress and style of speaking to contestants were based on those of Robinson.

The 100th episode was won by presenter and actress Ashley Hayden.
