= Fiona Coyne =

Fiona Coyne may refer to:

- Fiona Coyne (Degrassi character), a fictional character from Degrassi: The Next Generation
- Fiona Coyne (presenter) (1965–2010), host of the South African version of The Weakest Link
- "Fiona Coyne", a single from Skylar Spence’s 2015 album Prom King, named after the Degrassi character
