= Field of Wonders =

The Field of Wonders may refer to:

- The Field of Wonders (in the Land of the Fools), a fictional location in the 1936 Russian fantasy novel The Golden Key, or The Adventures of Buratino
- The Field of Wonders, Soviet, later Russian adaptation of the U.S. game show Wheel of Fortune
- The Field of Wonders (computer game), 1993 Russian computer game based on the game show
- The Field of Wonders (comedy), Russian comedy film
