= The Weakest Link (Irish game show) =

Irish television quiz show (2001–2002)

- Presented by: Eamon Dunphy
- Country of origin: Ireland
- No. of seasons: 1
- No. of episodes: 26

Original release
- Network: TV3
- Release: 17 September 2001 – July 2002

Related
- The Weakest Link

The Weakest Link (also known as The Weakest Link Ireland) is the Irish version of the quiz show, The Weakest Link.

The show was broadcast on TV3 from 17 September 2001 and was presented by Eamon Dunphy. Almost all spin-offs of the original show followed the BBC formula, which required the host to be a woman, but the Irish creators chose Dunphy because Irish viewers were already familiar with his abrasive style.

The producers of the series used the euro as the banking currency. This reduced the prize fund as the Irish pound was still in full circulation at the time and the euro would not be issued until January 2002.

26 episodes aired over the course of 6 months, but despite the format's success in the UK, the show was not renewed for a second season in Ireland.

== Money tree ==
| Question | Price (€) |
|---|---|
| 9 | €1,000 |
| 8 | €800 |
| 7 | €600 |
| 6 | €450 |
| 5 | €300 |
| 4 | €200 |
| 3 | €100 |
| 2 | €50 |
| 1 | €20 |
