= Official Ireland =

Irish phrase

"Official Ireland" (Irish: Éire Oifigiúil) is a term widely used in the Republic of Ireland to denote The Establishment. It refers to the most powerful figures in the media, the Catholic Church, and the political parties, who control the national debate.

It generally denotes support for constitutional Irish republicanism, private property, the Catholic Church, libertarianism in economics, Gaelicisation and Irish language revival, and rural life.

== History ==
The term was first used by footballer and journalist Eamon Dunphy.

Dr. Elaine Byrne has said "Official Ireland is predominantly male, over 50 and earners over €100,000. For the most part, it includes the speakers at this MacGill summer school]] and those that attend it. Official Ireland is characterised by the sameness of people in positions of power which means a uniformity of decision-making. This closed-minded conformism dismisses and belittles anyone who opposes the group consensus."

In recent times, the economist David McWilliams has repeatedly criticised the response of the so-called "Official Ireland" to the Great Recession of the late 2000s and early 2010s. Jonathan Sugarman also used the term in 2017.
