= Der Schwächste fliegt! =

2001 German television game show

- Created by: Fintan Coyle & Cathy Dunning
- Based on: The Weakest Link
- Presented by: Sonja Zietlow
- Theme music composer: Paul Farrer
- Country of origin: Germany
- Original language: German
- No. of seasons: 3 (March 2001-August 2001, September 2001-December 2001, February/March 2002)

Production
- Producer: Kai Sturm
- Editor: Uwe Juppe
- Running time: 45 minutes (approx)
- Production company: RTL Stormy Entertainment

Original release
- Network: RTL
- Release: March 19, 2001 – March 2002

Der Schwächste fliegt! is the German version of the game show The Weakest Link, literally meaning The Weakest one flies (colloquial German for: is thrown out).

It was first broadcast on 19 March 2001, on RTL. The show premiered on weekdays at 3:00 pm and was hosted by Sonja Zietlow (who was already known for a tough-talking style on her self-titled talk show from previous years). Like the British version, the show pitted nine contestants against each other for a pot of DM 50,000 (which had to be donated to charity, the winner picking the exact recipient). But by September of that year, the show was sinking fast in the ratings, to try and counteract the situation, she treated the contestants with more respect. Previously, she had bullied the contestants with insults such as "Da wollen wir doch mal sehen, wer unsere kostbare Studioluft lang genug weggeatmet hat!" (Let's take a look: who has used up our valuable studio air long enough?)

The change in Sonja's behaviour did not save the show, and it was cancelled in December. In February 2002 (after the introduction of the euro as a physical currency), the show was given another chance in the late-night Saturday slot, this time with a newly revamped studio, that now featured an audience, and a higher prize of €50,000. This version lasted for only two months.
