= Eamon Dunphy =

Irish association football player and journalist

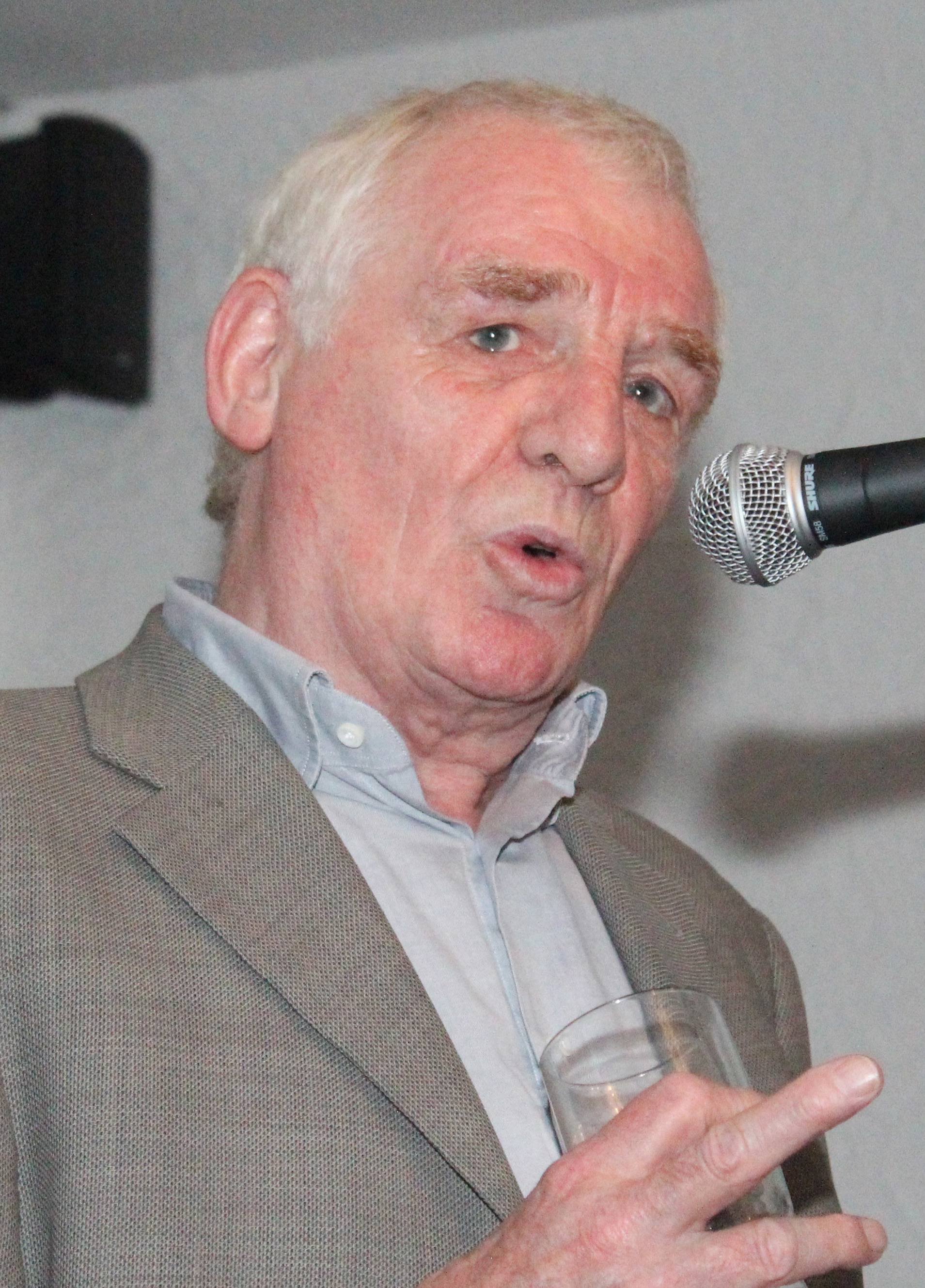
- Dunphy in 2013

Personal information
- Full name: Eamon Martin Dunphy
- Date of birth: 3 August 1945 (age 81)
- Place of birth: Dublin, Ireland
- Position: Midfielder

Youth career
- 195x–1962: Stella Maris
- 1962–1965: Manchester United

Senior career*
Years	Team	Apps	(Gls)
1965–1966	York City	22	(3)
1965–1973	Millwall	274	(24)
1973–1975	Charlton Athletic	42	(3)
1975–1977	Reading	77	(3)
1977–1978	Shamrock Rovers	33	(2)
Total		448	(35)

International career
1965–1971	Republic of Ireland	23	(0)
- * Club domestic league appearances and goals

Eamon Martin Dunphy (born 3 August 1945) is an Irish media personality, journalist, broadcaster, author, sports pundit and former professional footballer. He grew up playing football for several youth teams including Stella Maris, then moved to England playing for the youth side of Manchester United, then York City, Millwall, Charlton Athletic and Reading before returning to Ireland to turn out for Shamrock Rovers.

Since retiring from the sport, he has become recognisable to Irish television audiences as a football analyst during coverage of the Premier League, UEFA Champions League and international football on RTÉ.

In addition to his slot with RTÉ, Dunphy has worked for its rival television station, TV3 (for which he has presented a chat show and a game show), and rival radio stations Today FM and Newstalk. He was the original presenter of The Last Word on Today FM. Between 2004 and 2006, Dunphy presented the breakfast programme on Dublin's local Newstalk 106 radio station before it became a national broadcaster.

Later he moved to RTÉ Radio 1, where he presented a weekly programme, Conversations with Eamon Dunphy until 2009. He then returned to Newstalk, now broadcasting nationwide, only to leave again in 2011. Dunphy writes a column on football for the Irish Daily Star newspaper and hosts his podcast The Stand.

== Early life ==
Dunphy grew up in Drumcondra, Dublin, in what he described as "a one-room tenement flat [with] no electricity, no hot water". He attended Saint Patrick's National School, Drumcondra. In 1958 he got a one year government scholarship to Sandymount High School but he had to work as a messenger at tweed clothing shop Kevin and Howlin.

== Football playing career ==
=== Club career ===
A promising footballer, he left Dublin while still a teenager to join Manchester United as an apprentice. Dunphy did not break into the first team at United, and subsequently left to play for York City, Millwall, Charlton Athletic, Reading and Shamrock Rovers. It was at Millwall that Dunphy made the most impact; he was considered an intelligent and skilful player in the side's midfield.

Dunphy was a member of "The Class of '71", the Millwall side that failed by just one point to gain promotion to the Football League First Division.

He accompanied Johnny Giles back to Ireland to join Shamrock Rovers in 1977. Giles wanted to make the club Ireland's first full-time professional club, and hoped to make Rovers into a force in European football by developing talented young players at home who would otherwise go to clubs in England. Dunphy was originally intended to be in charge of youth development. However, despite an FAI Cup winners medal in 1978 (his only medal in senior football) and two appearances in the UEFA Cup Winners' Cup, Dunphy became disillusioned with the Irish game and dropped out of football altogether to concentrate on a career in journalism.

=== International career ===
Dunphy played 23 times for the Republic of Ireland and was Millwall's most capped international footballer with 22 caps, until surpassed by David Forde and Shane Ferguson.

He made his Ireland début on 10 November 1965 in the play-off at the Parc des Princes in Paris for the 1966 FIFA World Cup which Spain won 1–0, thanks to a José Ufarte goal. He went on to become, in his own words, "a good player, not a great player".

== Journalism ==
=== Newspaper work ===
After retiring from the game, Dunphy first began writing on football for the Sunday Tribune and then contributing regular columns on both football and current events for the Sunday Independent. He has also worked for Ireland on Sunday (now The Irish Mail on Sunday), The Sunday Press (now defunct), and the Irish Examiner. He writes a column on football for the Irish Daily Star. He coined the term "Official Ireland" to refer to the establishment.

In 1992 Dunphy wrote an article in the Sunday Independent alleging that politician Proinsias de Rossa was aware, while a member of the Workers' Party, of the Official IRA's alleged illegal activities, including bank robberies and forgery. In 1999 a High Court jury awarded £300,000 to de Rossa. In 2020 one of the Sunday Independent's most senior executives admitted that the paper went too far in the vindictive nastiness of its attacks on John Hume mounted by Dunphy in an incendiary back page piece.

=== Books ===
Since the 1980s, Dunphy has written a number of books. His first and most widely praised book is Only a Game? The Diary of a Professional Footballer, which is an autobiographical account of his days playing for Millwall. Written in diary form, it recorded events from the dressing room of his 1973–74 season, which began well for him at Millwall but subsequently ended in disillusionment: after being substituted in a 27 October 1973 home loss to eventual league winners Middlesbrough, Dunphy did not play another game all season, the club finishing mid-table.

In 1985, rock band U2 and manager Paul McGuinness commissioned him to write the story of their origins, formation, early years and the time leading up to their highly successful album The Joshua Tree. His book Unforgettable Fire - Past, Present, and Future - The Definitive Biography of U2 was published in 1988. It received some favourable reviews, but critics close to the band spoke of many inaccuracies. A verbal war erupted in the press during which Dunphy called lead singer Bono a "pompous git".

Dunphy has also written a biography of long-serving Manchester United manager Matt Busby and in 2002 ghost wrote the autobiography of Republic of Ireland and Manchester United player Roy Keane.

== Broadcasting career ==
=== Television ===
Since the mid-1980s, Dunphy has regularly appeared as an analyst during football coverage on Raidió Teilifís Éireann (RTÉ). Since RTÉ acquired the rights to show English football, he has been a regular contributor to Premier Soccer Saturday. He also contributes to analysis of UEFA Champions League games and, in international football, RTÉ's coverage of FIFA World Cups, UEFA European Football Championships and qualifying matches involving the Republic of Ireland national football team. He contributed to RTÉ Sport's coverage of the 2010 FIFA World Cup in South Africa. Dunphy's earnings from RTÉ for his football analysis (plus a radio show) include €328,051 in 2008 and €285,915 in 2007.

In 2001, he became the first male host of the quiz show The Weakest Link, which aired on TV3, for just one series. In 2003, he was hired again by TV3 to host their new Friday night chat show, entitled The Dunphy Show. Pitted head-to-head with RTÉ's long-running flagship programme, The Late Late Show, Dunphy's show lost what was a highly publicised "ratings war", and was cancelled before its original run was to conclude.

He is the first presenter of a made-for-mobile television show on the 3 mobile network in Ireland. His rants and "Spoofer of the Week" are watched by thousands of 3 Mobile customers. The shows were awarded "Best Entertainment Show" at Ireland's Digital Media Awards. Dunphy admits he never uses a mobile himself but enjoys filming for a mobile audience from his living room in Ranelagh.

In 2009, he made an emotive outburst on The Late Late Show during a discussion regarding then-Taoiseach Bertie Ahern's financial affairs.

In July 2018, Dunphy announced that he was leaving RTÉ after 40 years with the broadcaster, and that he intended to focus on his podcast The Stand with Eamon Dunphy.

=== Radio ===
Dunphy has also had a prominent radio career with several stations, including Today FM, Newstalk and RTÉ Radio 1.

He was the original host in 1997 of the popular current affairs show The Last Word on Today FM. In September 2004, he took over The Breakfast Show slot on the Dublin radio station Newstalk 106 from David McWilliams. The show tried to court controversy and listeners in equal measure. He failed to attract the large listenership predicted, with only a few additional thousand tuning in. He announced in June 2006 his intention to leave Newstalk 106, citing an inability to sustain the demands of an early morning schedule. After his departure from Newstalk 106, he confirmed he was suffering from a viral illness. He later recovered.

In July 2006, RTÉ announced that Dunphy would present a new weekly programme as part of the new RTÉ Radio 1 autumn schedule.

He rejoined Newstalk but left again in 2011 "due to interference from management and a push to put a more positive spin on the news". On his last show he accused his boss Denis O'Brien of "hating journalism". He quit after Sam Smyth was sacked from Today FM (also owned by O'Brien), and said management at Newstalk were trying to remove "dissenting voices" like Constantin Gurdgiev from the airwaves.

== Personal life ==
Dunphy was a daily Mass-goer until he was preparing for marriage to his first wife, Sandra from Salford, when he was 21. He was Catholic and she was Protestant. The priest instructing them for marriage disapproved strongly of the mixed couple, saying that he should not marry her because she was "not a proper person". Dunphy's observance was already weakening but he quit his daily Mass-going at this point. He and Sandra had two children, a boy and a girl, and Dunphy is now a grandfather. His first marriage ended and he moved to Castletownshend in Cork for two years in the early 1990s. He lived with another partner, Inge, before meeting his second wife, RTÉ commissioning editor Jane Gogan, in the Horseshoe Bar in Dublin in 1992. They married at the Unitarian Church on St Stephen's Green on 24 September 2009.

In 2002 Dunphy was banned from driving for a decade after being arrested for drunk driving and had eight previous convictions under the Road Traffic Act.

In an interview with An Phoblacht, Dunphy, who had previously written highly critical articles on the Provisional IRA and Sinn Féin, stated that he is now a Sinn Féin supporter and declared he had voted for them in the 2011 general election. He described their representatives as "incredibly hard-working and incredibly intelligent". In May 2017, he said that he is a Liverpool supporter.

He published his autobiography entitled The Rocky Road in October 2013.

Dunphy lives near Ranelagh in Dublin and owns a holiday home in Deauville, France.

== In popular culture ==
The deceased satirist and actor Dermot Morgan, known to international audiences as Father Ted, did a much-admired Eamon Dunphy impression on the satirical radio show Scrap Saturday. Different sketches had him engaged in apparent inane and ridiculous arguments. They ranged from his criticism of Mother Teresa for "not being a real nun" to his attack on the week's weather. Dunphy left RTÉ's analysis team the day before the 1986 FIFA World Cup Final, when he objected to Morgan's portrayal of him and Giles as monosyllabic.

Dunphy's hyperbole was parodied on RTÉ's Après Match show lampooning celebrities, footballers and broadcasters.

Oliver Callan also does impersonations of Dunphy, one of which Dunphy approved for a radio charity advertisement.
