= Slaboye Zveno =

Russian television game show

- Based on: Weakest Link
- Directed by: Tatiana Dmitrakova (2001–2008); Guzel Kireeva (2020–2023)
- Presented by: Mariya Kiselyova (2001–2005, 2020–2023), Nikolai Fomenko (2007–2008); Leonid Yakubovich (25 December 2002)
- Narrated by: Dmitry Roshektayev (2001–2005), Pavel Kipnis (2007–2008), Pyotr Kuleshov (2020–2023)
- Theme music composer: Paul Farrer
- Composer: Paul Farrer
- Country of origin: Russia
- Original language: Russian
- No. of seasons: 6

Production
- Executive producer: Pavel Korchagin (2020–2023)
- Producer: Andrey Mogirev (2020–2023)
- Running time: 38-50 minutes
- Production companies: Ways Media (2001–2005, 2007–2008); Studio 2V (2020–2023)

Original release
- Network: Channel One (2001–2005), Petersburg – Channel 5 (2007–2008); MIR (2020–2023)
- Release: 25 September 2001 – 13 January 2023

Slaboye zveno (Russian: Слабое звено, English translation: A weak link) is the Russian version of the game show The Weakest Link. It was first broadcast on September 25, 2001, on Channel One Russia, and last broadcast on July 2, 2005, after the host Mariya Kiselyova asked for a maternity leave and the rights for the network to broadcast the show expired before her return.

Channel 5 had broadcast the show from December 2, 2007, to December 28, 2008, with Nikolai Fomenko as host.

The show would not be broadcast again until 2020, when MIR acquired the rights to present the show. The revival premiered on February 14, with Kiselyova as the host once again. On March 1, 2022, following the Russian invasion of Ukraine, BBC Studios revoked the rights for any Russian networks to exhibit a version of the show. The episodes that had been already in production aired normally, with the final episode of the 2020 revival premiering on January 13, 2023.

Since March 8, 2023, an unlicensed version of the show deemed Na Vyhkod! (Russian: На выход!, English translation: To the way out) has been broadcast on STS, with roughly the same format as the original show.

== Money tree ==
Question	Price (rubles ₽.)			
Question	September—October 2001	2001—2008, November 2020-January 2023	Special editions from 2001—2004	February—November 2020
9	30,000	—		
8	24,000	50,000	125,000	40,000
7	18,000	40,000	100,000	30,000
6	13,000	30,000	75,000	20,000
5	9,000	20,000	50,000	15,000
4	6,000	10,000	25,000	10,000
3	3,000	5,000	12,000	5,000
2	1,500	2,000	6,000	2,000
1	500	1,000	3,000	1,000

== Trivia ==
In late 2002, the channel's several leading game show hosts swapped places. In the event Mariya Kiselyova hosted the New Year edition of Who Wants to Be a Millionaire?, while Pole Chudes host Leonid Yakubovich hosted The Weakest Link. That episode has set a record. The winner Roman Madyanov has received a prize of ₽402,000 rubles (out of the grand prize of one million rubles).
