= Najsłabsze ogniwo =

- Logo of the show
- Presented by: Kazimiera Szczuka
- Music by: Paul Farrer
- Country of origin: Poland
- Original language: Polish
- No. of seasons: 4
- No. of episodes: ca. 200

Production
- Running time: ca. 45 minutes
- Production companies: ITI Film Studio; BBC WorldWide

Original release
- Network: TVN
- Release: 1 March 2004 – 22 December 2005

Najsłabsze ogniwo is the Polish version of the game show Weakest Link aired from 1 March 2004 to 22 December 2005 on TVN. The show was hosted by Kazimiera Szczuka. The show consisted of seven rounds and a final with 8 contestants against each other for a pot of 27,000 złoty (PLN). This show was watched usually by 3 million viewers (average 1.5 million).

== The game's prizes for questions ==
- 1. question correct • 100 zł
- 2. question correct • 300 zł
- 3. question correct • 600 zł
- 4. question correct • 900 zł
- 5. question correct • 1,300 zł
- 6. question correct • 1,800 zł
- 7. question correct • 2,400 zł
- 8. question correct • 3,000 zł
