= The Dunphy Show =

- Genre: Light entertainment
- Directed by: Maurice Linnane
- Presented by: Eamon Dunphy
- Opening theme: "I Fought the Law"
- Composer: The Clash
- Country of origin: Ireland
- Original language: English
- No. of series: 1
- No. of episodes: 15

Production
- Executive producer: Jane Gogan
- Producer: Cillian Fennell
- Production location: The Helix
- Camera setup: Multi-camera
- Running time: 120 minutes
- Production companies: DC Productions; Double Z Enterprises

Original release
- Network: TV3
- Release: 5 September – 12 December 2003

Related
- The Late Late Show

The Dunphy Show is an Irish chat show hosted by Eamon Dunphy that aired for one series on TV3 in 2003. The programme featured guest interviews, audience participation and live music from guest music groups. The Dunphy Show aired every Friday night in direct competition with The Late Late Show on Raidió Teilifís Éireann (RTÉ).

== History ==
=== Challenging The Late Late Show ===
Since 1962, RTÉ's The Late Late Show had enjoyed total dominance of the Irish chat show market on a Saturday night and subsequently on Friday nights. In 2002, TV3 set about devising their own chat show which would go "head-to-head" and challenge RTÉ's monopoly. By the start of 2003, planning was at an advanced stage after six months of preparatory work; however, little details were revealed about the precise nature of the show or who would host. Ironically, the team behind the programme included Cillian Fennell, an ex-RTÉ producer who had worked on The Late Late Show during Gay Byrne's final season.

In May 2003, TV3 announced that former soccer player and journalist Eamon Dunphy had signed a contract to present the new show. Following the announcement the media immediately declared a "clash of the chat shows" and a clash of personalities between Dunphy and Pat Kenny. In an interview with the RTÉ Guide, Kenny described broadcasting as a "hobby for Dunphy" and that "if it goes pear-shaped for Eamon he'll write another book about Gazza or something". Former chat show host Gay Byrne said that "there wasn't enough room for two talk shows" and that TV3 would be "scalded by the experience".

=== Debut ===
The Dunphy Show made its debut at 9:00 p.m. on 5 September 2003 for an initial run of thirty programmes. The opening set of guests included former footballer Páidí Ó Sé, author Candace Bushnell, journalist Robert Fisk, jockey Kieren Fallon and Huey Morgan from the Fun Loving Criminals, while the musical guests were Joe Dolan and his band, and singer-songwriter Paul Brady. The opening programme received relatively good reviews, with Shane Hegarty of The Irish Times stating that "while there was little of the controversial Dunphy on show, there remained a real edge about the TV3 host. Ding, ding. End of round one. Kenny should be worried, Dunphy should be happy."

=== Cancellation ===
The first edition of The Dunphy Show attracted a total audience of 342,000. The first three shows attracted an average total audience of 260,000 compared to 615,000 for The Late Late Show, however, the numbers tuning in for the third edition of Dunphy's chat show fell to 157,000. In November it was announced that the show would be going off-air for a six-week break at Christmas due to commercial reasons and for contractual reasons with Dunphy. This was viewed in some media circles as an indication that the show was failing and it came in for some harsher criticism after a promising start. On 5 December 2003, exactly three months to the day since the show began, TV3 announced that it was cancelling The Dunphy Show.

== Production ==
The Dunphy Show was broadcast from The Helix at Dublin City University (DCU) in front of an audience of 450, All bar one of the shows were broadcast live.
