= The Weakest Link (video game) =

2001 video game

Weakest Link
- Developer: Traveller's Tales
- Publisher: Activision
- Platforms: PlayStation, Microsoft Windows, PlayStation 2
- Release: EU: 28 September 2001; NA: 2 October 2001 (PS); NA: 8 November 2001 (PC)
- Genre: Game show
- Modes: Single-player, multiplayer

The Weakest Link (also known as Weakest Link in the English (US) version and Le Maillon Faible in the French version) is a video game based on the television game show of the same name, developed by Traveller's Tales and published by Activision under license from BBC Multimedia for the PlayStation, PlayStation 2 and Microsoft Windows platforms (although the PlayStation 2 port was released exclusively in Europe). In the English (UK / US) version, Anne Robinson, the television show's real-life host, features in the game throughout gameplay and recorded footage.

== Development and release ==
On 17 April 2001, BBC Worldwide's software division BBC Multimedia signed an agreement with Activision to release video games based on the show in countries where a local version of the show was airing. The game would be released for the PlayStation, PlayStation 2 and Windows at the end of the year, with potential releases for Nintendo systems and the Xbox also planned. The game was officially revealed the following month at E3 2001, with an appearance from Anne Robinson at Activision's booth. In August, it was announced that the game would be released on 28 September on all three platforms in the UK.

The game's release was made to captalise on the success of the Who Wants to Be a Millionaire? video games by Eidos Interactive.

== Reception ==
Reception

Aggregate scores
| Aggregator | Score | | |
| Aggregator | PC | PS | PS2 |
|---|---|---|---|
| GameRankings | 55% | 75% | 63% |
| Metacritic | 47/100 | 63/100 | N/A |

Review scores
| Publication | Score | | |
| Publication | PC | PS | PS2 |
|---|---|---|---|
| AllGame | 1.5/5 | 2.5/5 | N/A |
| Computer Gaming World | 1.5/5 | N/A | N/A |
| Electronic Gaming Monthly | N/A | 7/10 | N/A |
| Eurogamer | 6/10 | N/A | N/A |
| Game Informer | N/A | 7/10 | N/A |
| GameRevolution | D+ | N/A | N/A |
| GameSpot | 4.4/10 | N/A | N/A |
| GameZone | 6/10 | N/A | N/A |
| IGN | 3.5/10 | N/A | N/A |
| PlayStation Official Magazine – UK | N/A | N/A | 4/10 |
| Official U.S. PlayStation Magazine | N/A | 3.5/5 | N/A |
| PC Gamer (US) | 73% | N/A | N/A |

The PlayStation version received "mixed" reviews, while the PC version received "generally unfavorable reviews", according to the review aggregation website Metacritic.

IGN criticized the PC version's gameplay for slow pace and the graphics by stating they were "drab".
