= Leonid Yakubovich =

Russian actor and television host (born 1945)

Leonid Yakubovich PAR
- Леонид Якубович
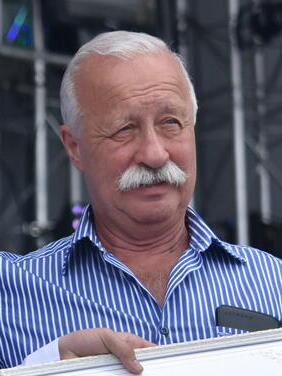
- Yakubovich in 2019
- Born: Leonid Arkadyevich Yakubovich; 31 July 1945 (age 81); Moscow, RSFSR, USSR
- Citizenship: Soviet Union; Russia
- Occupations: Television host; actor; film producer; screenwriter; prose; showman
- Years active: 1979–present
- Height: 1.68 m (5 ft 6 in)
- Title: People's Artist of Russia (2002)
- Awards: Order of Friendship

Leonid Arkadyevich Yakubovich PAR (Russian: Леонид Аркадьевич Якубович, born 31 July 1945) is a Russian actor, television host and showman, best known for hosting the game show Pole Chudes (the Russian version of the Wheel of Fortune – literally, The Field of Wonders – and the celebrity episode of Slaboye Zveno). Yakubovich is one of the best-known television and internet personalities in Russia. In January 2023, Ukraine imposed economic sanctions on Leonid Yakubovich for his support of 2022 Russian invasion of Ukraine.

== Biography ==
Yakubovich was born in Moscow to a Jewish family, His father was born in Belarus to Belarusian-Jewish parents. In his youth, Yakubovich sought a practical profession, and studied metal craftsmanship. After finishing his education, he went to work at ZIL as a heat-gas technician. In college, Yakubovich started performing in the Russian KVN show.

In the 1980s he became a freelance satire writer and actor, and even played in the Russian children's "film-magazine" Yeralash. Even so, Yakubovich was not considered experienced enough for regular work in television until in 1991 he accepted Vladislav Listyev's proposal to host Pole Chudes. Listyev was previously a mentor to Yakubovich, and helped sharpen his acting skills, among others.
