= Heikoin lenkki =

Finnish game show

- Genre: Game show
- Created by: Fintan Coyle; Cathy Dunning
- Presented by: Kirsi Salo; Riku Nieminen
- Composer: Paul Farrer
- Country of origin: Finland
- Original language: Finnish
- No. of seasons: 2
- No. of episodes: 130

Production
- Executive producer: Markus Selin (2002–2005)
- Producers: Petteri Ahomaa (2002–2005); P&G (2017–2019)
- Running time: 45 minutes
- Production companies: 2002–2005: Solar Films; 2017–2018: Banijay Finland ltd

Original release
- Network: MTV3
- Release: 6 September 2002 – 18 February 2005
- Network: Nelonen
- Release: 20 March 2017 – 21 May 2018

Heikoin lenkki is the Finnish version of the international franchise The Weakest Link, which debuted on BBC Two in August 2000. It was hosted by journalist Kirsi Salo. It premiered in 2002, but after three years, the show was axed due to the host's pregnancy. It was shown on the MTV3 network on Fridays at 8:35 pm.

The show was brought back in 2017 with new host Riku Nieminen.

Originally, nine contestants played for a prize of €15,000, but that was changed to eight players competing for €18,000.

== Money tree ==
| Question | Price (€) | | |
| Question | 2002 | 2002–2005 | 2017–2018 |
|---|---|---|---|
| 9 | €1,500 | — | |
| 8 | €1,200 | €2,000 | €2,500 |
| 7 | €900 | €1,400 | €1,250 |
| 6 | €675 | €900 | €750 |
| 5 | €450 | €500 | €500 |
| 4 | €300 | €200 | €200 |
| 3 | €150 | €100 | €100 |
| 2 | €75 | €50 | €50 |
| 1 | €30 | €20 | €20 |
