= The Establishment =

Dominant group that holds power

In sociology and in political science, the term the establishment describes a dominant social group, the elite who control a polity, an organization, or an institution. In the praxis of wealth and power, the Establishment usually is a self-selecting, closed elite entrenched within specific institutions—hence, a relatively small social class can exercise all socio-political control.

In 1955, British journalist Henry Fairlie popularized the contemporary usage of the term The Establishment to denote the network of socially prominent and politically important people:

By the 'Establishment' I do not mean only the centres of official power—though they are certainly part of it—but rather the whole matrix of official and social relations within which power is exercised. The exercise of power in Britain (more specifically, in England) cannot be understood unless it is recognised that it is exercised socially.

Consequently, the term the Establishment became common usage in the press of London; The Oxford English Dictionary cites Fairlie's column originating the British usages of the term the Establishment, as in the established church denoting the official Church of England. Moreover, in sociologic jargon, an outsider is the person who is not a member of The Establishment.

== Australia ==
The term establishment is often used in Australia to refer both to the main political parties and also to the powers behind those parties. In the book, Anti-political Establishment Parties: A Comparative Analysis by Amir Abedi (2004), Amir Abedi refers to the Labor Party and the Coalition Parties (the Liberal Party and the National/Country Party) as the establishment parties.

== Canada ==
The original Canadian Establishment began as a mix between the British and American models, combining political appointments and business acumen. In Francophone Canada, the local leaders of the Catholic Church played a major role. The Family Compact is the first identifiable Canadian Establishment in Anglophone Canada.

The journalist Peter C. Newman defined the modern Canadian Establishment in his 1975 book The Canadian Establishment. It catalogued the richest individuals and families living in Canada at the time. All of the specific people he identified were prominent business leaders, especially in the media and in public transit. Newman reports that several of these old families have maintained their importance into the twenty-first century.

== Hong Kong ==
The term is also used in politics of Hong Kong, where political parties, community groups, chambers of commerce, trade unions and individuals who are cooperative with and loyal to the Chinese Communist Party and the post-handover Hong Kong Government are labelled (most often self-labelled) "pro-Beijing" or "pro-establishment". The term first appeared in 2004.

== Ireland ==
The term "Official Ireland" is commonly used in the Republic of Ireland to denote the media, cultural and religious establishment.

== Pakistan ==
In Pakistan, the term "The Establishment" refers to the military and their relations with the intelligence community and high-level political officials that allow them to exert dominance over the government.

== United Kingdom ==
The United Kingdom has numerous entrenched groups that are regarded as forming the establishment: these include the royal family, the aristocracy, the landed gentry, prestigious public schools like Eton College and Harrow School, the privy council, senior civil servants, lawyers, academics, Church of England clergy, financiers, industrialists, the armed services and other professionals.

== United States ==
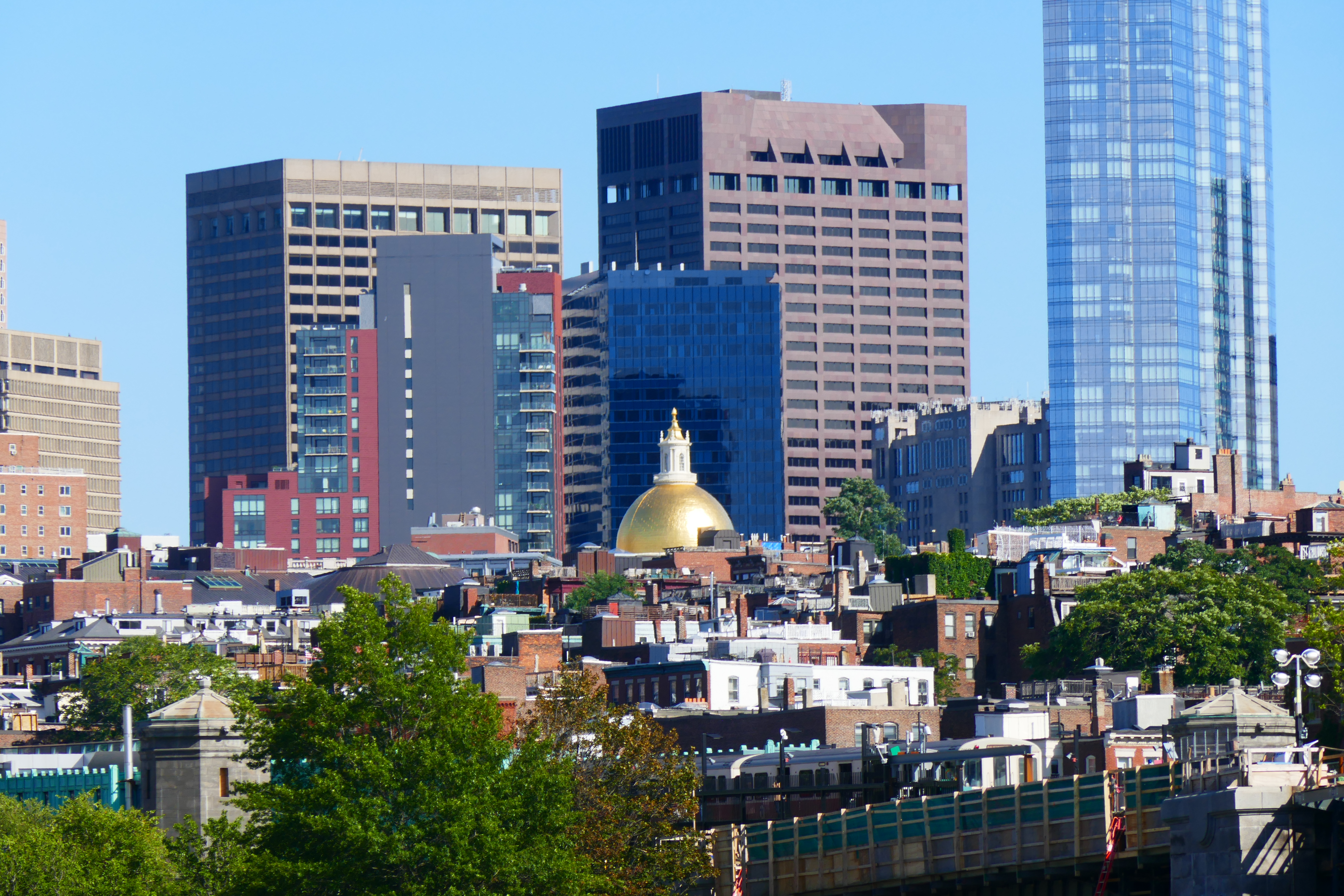
Beacon Hill, Boston: a preeminent Boston Brahmin neighborhood.

In the United States, the term the establishment typically refers to the two-party political system, in which the Republican Party and the Democratic Party are perceived as alike in their support of neoliberalism, defined by anti-labor and pro-federal policy, as well as vehement defense of corporate interests. This use can also refer to the original coinage of the term the Establishment in 1955, referring to the intricate matrix of power and connections among corporations, politicians, non-governmental organizations, government agencies, and some social groups.

The overt exertion of the power of the establishment has significantly increased in the wake of Donald Trump's election as president in 2016, though it was a powerful force long before his election. A marked increase of political polarization, both perceived and actual, was noted under his election. This further increases power and reach through division. Within the two parties, the term has largely fallen out of use, except as a pejorative.

The term also refers to White Anglo-Saxon Protestants (WASPs), who constitute much of the social elites that have dominated historical American society, culture, and politics, enjoying education, voting rights, and land ownership. In the 1950s, the New Left criticised WASP hegemony of American society. Some prominent American families have held disproportionate wealth and wielded disproportionate political power over the decades. Experts talk about what C. Wright Mills called the "power elite", and about leadership communities in policy areas such as foreign policy.

Traditionally, WASP and Protestant establishment families have been associated with Episcopal (Anglican), Presbyterian, United Methodist, Congregationalist, and other mainline Protestant denominations.

== See also ==
- Anti-establishment – Opposition to the conventional social, political, and economic principles of a society
- Boston Brahmins – Upper class Bostonians
- Cabal – Clever scheme or artful plot, usually crafted for evil purposes
- Cronyism – Government favoritism
- Deep state – Covert government networks
- Drain the swamp – American political catch phrase
- First Families of Virginia – Socially prominent families in colonial Virginia
- Iron law of oligarchy – Political theory developed by Robert Michels
- New World Order (conspiracy theory) – Conspiracy theory regarding a totalitarian world government
- Power to the people (slogan) – Political slogan or rallying cry
- Ruling party – Political party or coalition holding a majority of elected positions
- State religion – Religion or creed endorsed by the state
- Status quo – Latin term meaning the existing state of affairs
- The Man – Slang phrase
- The powers that be – Phrase referring to those who hold authority
- International Democracy Union – International alliance of right-of-centre political parties
