= Fiona Coyne (presenter) =

South African actress, writer and television personality/presenter

- Born: 22 June 1965; Springs, South Africa
- Died: 18 August 2010 (aged 45); Fish Hoek, South Africa
- Occupations: Actress; author; playwright; television presenter
- Known for: Hosting the South African version of The Weakest Link

Fiona Coyne (22 June 1965 – 18 August 2010) was a South African actress, author, playwright and television presenter who hosted the South African version of The Weakest Link.

Coyne was born in Springs, South Africa in 1965. She was a member of the Capab drama group for seven years after training as an actor. She also worked at a rhinoceros and elephant sanctuary in Kenya for four years.

She was the playwright of many notable plays such as The Birthday, Glass Roots and As the Koekie crumbles.

In 2009, Coyne appeared in The Adventures of Pinocchio, a pantomime by Janice Honeyman, as Katarina the Cat. She also authored the book Who Moved My Ladder? The Working Woman's Guide to Success.

Coyne was best known in South Africa for her position as the presenter of The Weakest Link. Her appearance, hair, dress and style of speaking to contestants were based on those of Anne Robinson, who hosted the British version of the show. Coyne beat approximately 500 people for The Weakest Link position. She travelled to London in 2003 to train with Anne Robinson before the South African version of the show was launched.

Coyne died at her home in Fish Hoek, South Africa, on 18 August 2010, aged 45, from a suspected suicide. She had recently divorced her husband, Willie Fritz, after 22 years of marriage. She had reportedly left notes for her housekeeper, Zoleka Shumani, and her family. Her funeral was held at St. Peter's Roman Catholic church in Strand, Western Cape.
