= Louise Wallace =

New Zealand television presenter

Louise Wallace MNZM
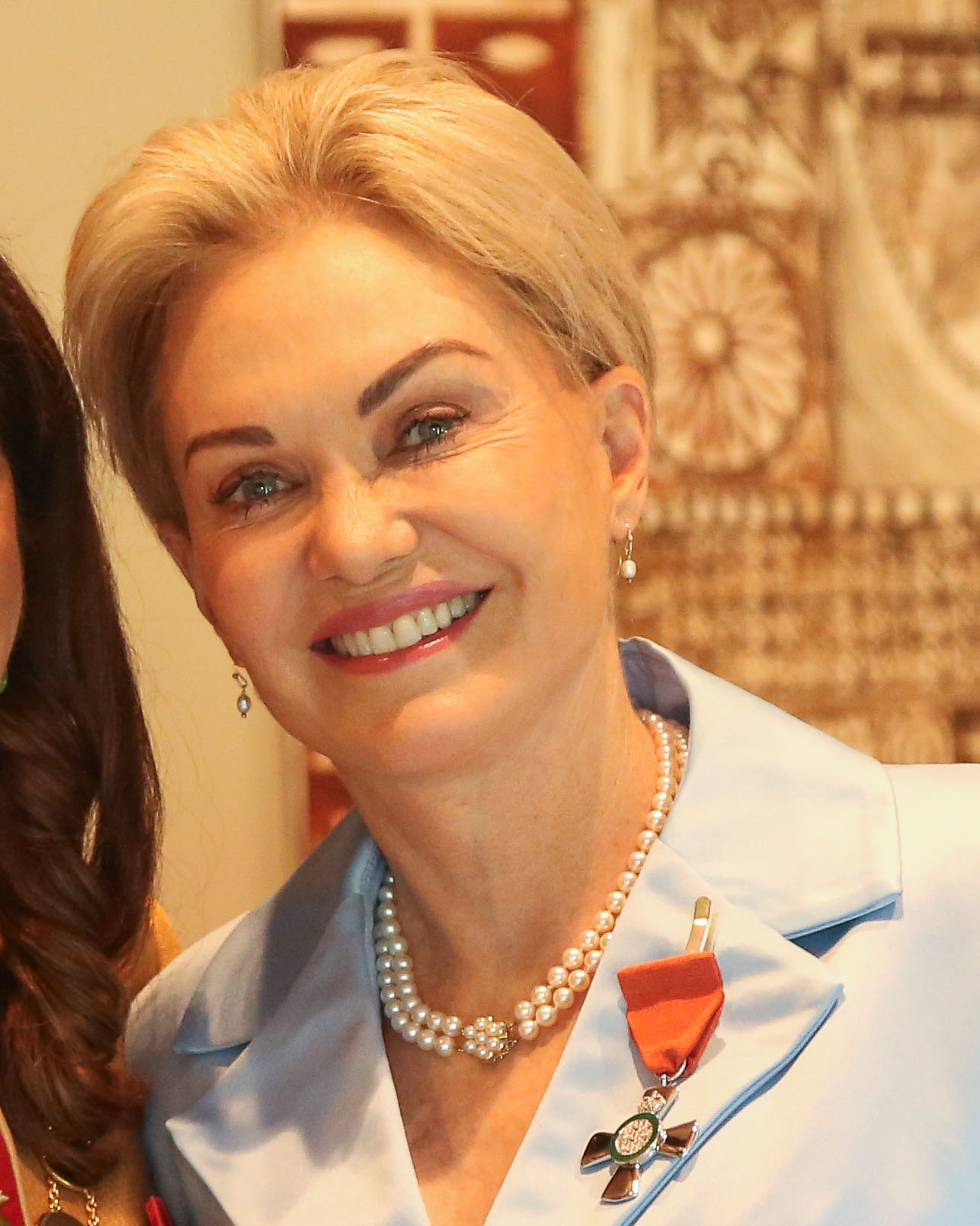
- Wallace in 2025
- Born: Louise Annette Hooper; 21 November 1959 (age 66); Auckland, New Zealand
- Education: St Cuthbert's College; Auckland Technical Institute; Webber Douglas Academy of Dramatic Art; University of Sydney
- Occupations: Actor, presenter, TV personality
- Spouse: Scott Wallace (m. 1983)
- Children: 2

Louise Annette Wallace MNZM (née Hooper; born 21 November 1959) is a New Zealand television presenter, actress, and director.

== Early life ==
Born Louise Annette Hooper in Auckland on 21 November 1959, Wallace was educated at St Cuthbert's College. She went on to study at Auckland Technical Institute, where she completed a diploma in marketing and advertising; the University of Auckland and the Webber Douglas Academy of Dramatic Art, gaining a diploma in drama and acting; and the University of Sydney, graduating with a Bachelor of Arts degree in 1986.

== Career ==
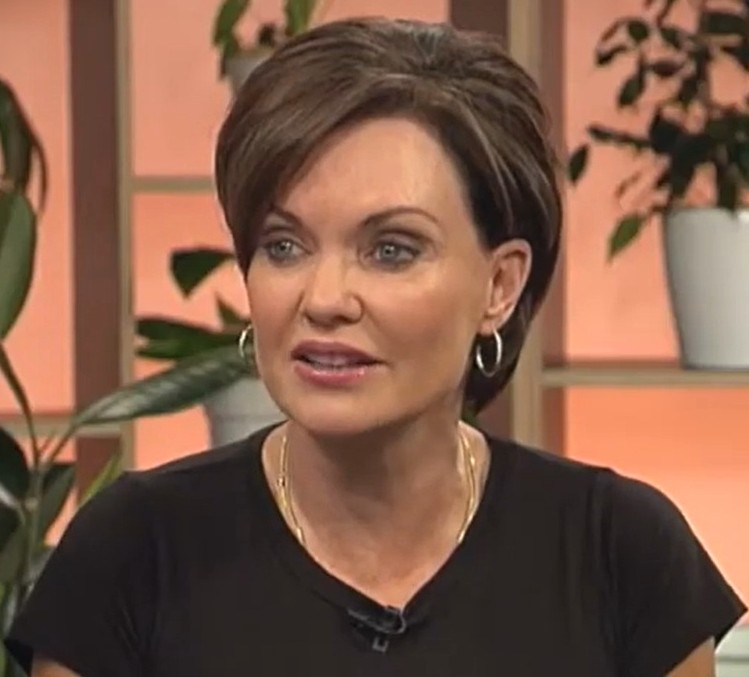
Wallace in 2017

After living in Australia and contributing to television shows on Network Ten, Nine Network, and ABC Television, Wallace returned to Auckland in 1989 to work as a current affairs reporter and presenter for New Zealand's first private-commercial television channel TV3. She filed stories for shows such as 60 Minutes, 20/20, and Nightline and worked as a sports presenter on the network's flagship show 3 News. Wallace's work earned her the Steinlager Prize (for sports presenting) and the award for Best Tourism Story at the Qantas Media Awards in 1992 and 1993, respectively. In 1996, she was a finalist for Best Presenter at the New Zealand Film and Television Awards.

Wallace departed TV3 in 1998 and subsequently worked predominantly as an actress, with roles on Street Legal and Legend of the Seeker. She also worked as a presenter, fronting documentaries and features, as well as the New Zealand version of the international quiz show The Weakest Link in 2001, 2002, and 2009. In 2003, she appeared as a contestant on reality television game show Celebrity Treasure Island and would serve as presenter and director for later seasons of the show. Wallace also directed the New Zealand edition of The Apprentice.

Her most recent roles on television include stints on Shortland Street and Agent Anna.

In May 2016, Wallace was revealed to be one of six women to be featured on the first season of The Real Housewives of Auckland. On 6 September 2016 Wallace, along with her cast mates from The Real Housewives of Auckland, competed on New Zealand's All Star Family Feud, going up against The Bachelor's season two contestants.

In the 2025 King’s Birthday Honours, Wallace was appointed a Member of the New Zealand Order of Merit, for services to the entertainment industry.

== Personal life ==
In 1983, she married Scott Wallace, and the couple had two children. After living in Remuera with her family, Wallace moved back to her childhood home on Paritai Drive in Ōrākei with her husband.

== See also ==
- List of New Zealand television personalities
