= The Weakest Link (New Zealand game show) =

New Zealand television quiz show (2001–2002)

- Genre: Game show
- Presented by: Louise Wallace
- Country of origin: New Zealand
- No. of series: 2

Production
- Producer: Darryl McEwen
- Running time: 60 minutes (with commercials)

Original release
- Network: TV One
- Release: 17 July 2001 – March 2002

Related
- The Weakest Link

The Weakest Link is a New Zealand game show based on the original version in the United Kingdom. It was broadcast on TV One and was hosted by Louise Wallace. Season one aired on Tuesday nights in 2001, while season two aired in 2002 on weekends.

== Format ==
This version of the show featured nine contestants competing for prize money of up to 20 thousand New Zealand dollars. The New Zealand general knowledge questions for the show were written by Derek Bolt. In the first seven rounds there was a money tree ($50, $100, $200, $400, $600, $900, $1,200, $1,600, $2,000) with $2,000 as the maximum result. The 8th round was the same, except the winnings were tripled.

The show was filmed at Studio West in West Auckland.

== Special episodes ==
The show aired three celebrity specials, one of which was sports-themed. In each celebrity special, money was raised for nominated charities. One of the contestants in the first celebrity special was Tim Shadbolt, the Mayor of Invercargill. In the second celebrity special, $9,600 was raised. This was the highest amount ever achieved on the New Zealand version.

== Reception and impact ==
The first episode pulled in 670,000 people, outperforming Holmes.

The show's first two episodes received over six hundred thousand viewers, almost half of the national television audience. Amanda Young, one of the winners of the show said about the experience "It was actually fun. I love that sort of thing of answering questions, pub quizzes, although I haven't entered that many of them." Television New Zealand newsreaders and reporters had been banned from participating in one of the show's celebrity specials because bosses claimed that they didn't want their media staff to look dumb to primetime viewers. New Zealand On Air had reportedly found a new comedy for young adults, who were believed to be stunned by dumb answers.

In 2001, then-Labour Cabinet Minister Lianne Dalziel referenced the show's catchphrase when she told members of the New Zealand National Party "You're all the weakest link. Goodbye."
