= The Field of Wonders =

Russian game show

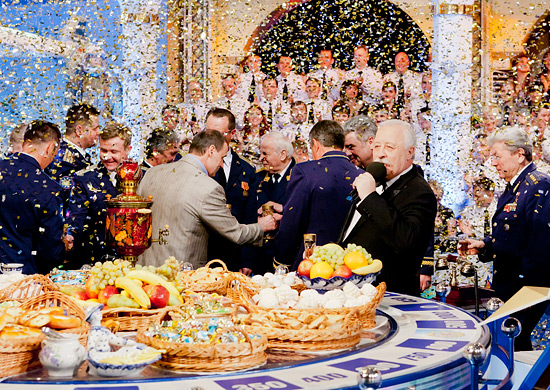
- Photo for the centenary of the Russian Air Force aired on August 10th 2012
- Russian: Поле Чудес
- Genre: Game show
- Created by: Alexey Murmulyov; Vladislav Listyev
- Based on: Wheel of Fortune by Merv Griffin
- Directed by: Ivan Demidov
- Presented by: Vladislav Listyev; Leonid Yakubovich; Special series: Valdis Pelšs
- Theme music composer: Lev Spivak (1990–1996); Vladimir Rackevich (1996–present)
- Composer: Vladimir Rackevich
- Country of origin: Russia
- Original language: Russian
- No. of episodes: 1513

Production
- Production location: Ostankino
- Running time: 60 minutes
- Production companies: VID (1990–2021); Studio "Experiment" (1990–1995); Studio-A (2021–present); Pole-TV (2021–present)

Original release
- Network: First Programme of Central TV USSR (1990-1991); Channel 1 Ostankino (1991-1995); Public Russian Television/Channel One Russia (1995-present)
- Release: 25 October 1990 – present

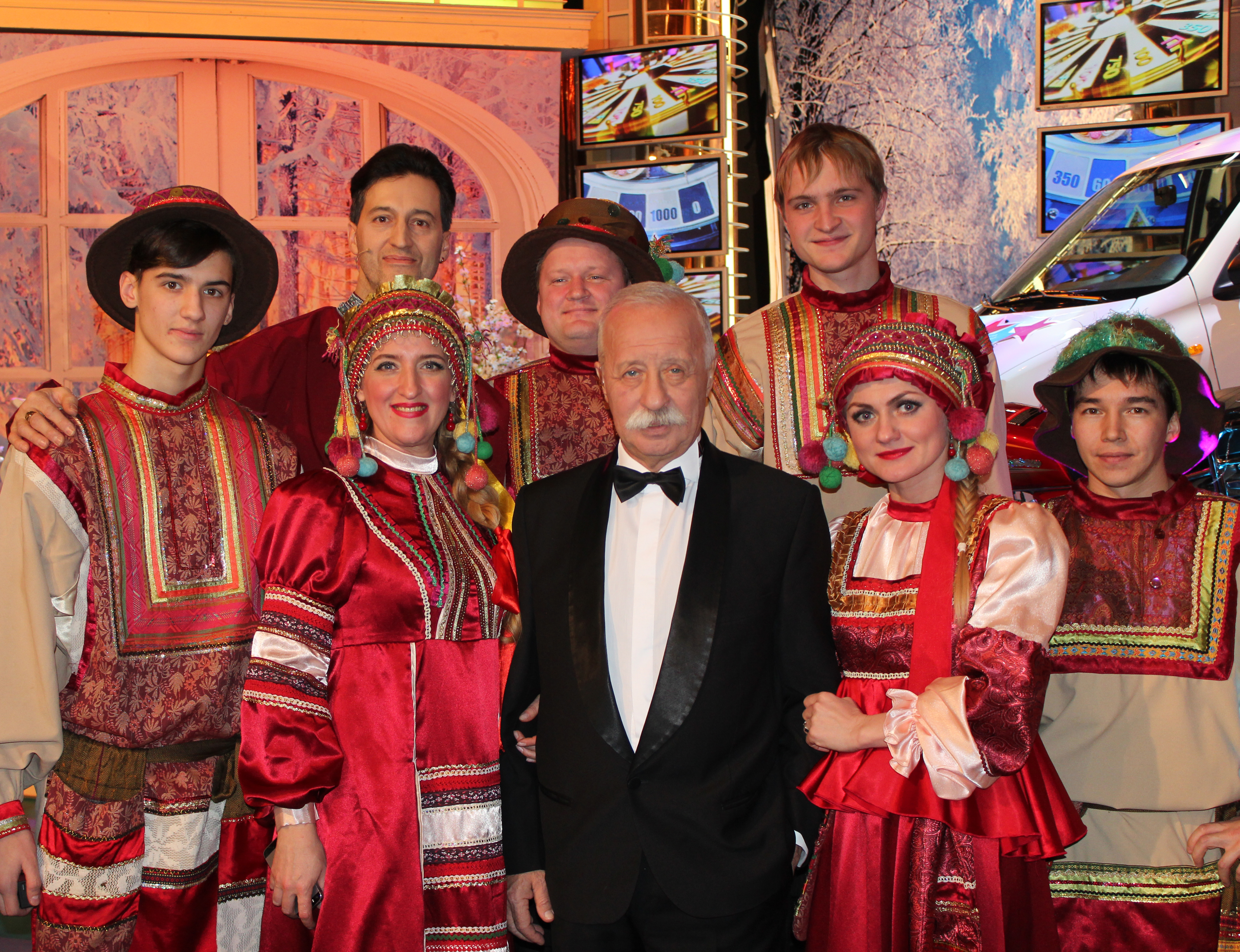
Host with musical performers who were brought by a guest as a musical gift

The Field of Wonders (Russian: По́ле Чуде́с, IPA: [ˈpolʲɪ tɕʉˈdʲes]) is a Soviet, later Russian adaptation of the American game show Wheel of Fortune (loosely based on the original format; the license wasn't bought from the distributor) produced by VID, provided with elements of Russian culture and hosted by Leonid Yakubovich.

In late 2021, Channel One Russia stopped buying The Field of Wonders from VID and originally meant to replace it with a licensed version of Wheel of Fortune under the same name since January 2022. Due to a trademark dispute with VID, the title of the new show was supposed to be Nashe Pole Chudes (Our Field of Wonders). However, VID later agreed to let Channel One keep the original The Field of Wonders name and the full 31-year archive, while Channel One will be producing the show onwards.

== Format ==
Three contestants at a time compete by spinning a "cylinder" to determine a value or event, and then by guessing letters concealed in a puzzle to earn points. Unlike the American version, all of the puzzles in a show revolve around a specific theme, and the puzzle is an answer to a question given beforehand as an additional clue.

If a player manages to guess three different letters in a streak (and during one turn), they can earn a permanent cash bonus by picking one of two boxes presented to the player. 0 points and bankrupt does not break.

Special spaces on the wheel include;

- Prize (П): A player who lands on this space can either take 1000 points, or take a secret prize as a buy-out to leave the game. The prize, which is hidden in a black box, may be a car, prize or some booby prize (such as a vegetable). Alternatively, the player may choose to accept a cash buyout, similar to Let's Make a Deal.
- Plus (+): Allows a player to choose a letter position, and reveal what letter is behind it and all other instances of it in the puzzle. No points are scored.
- Chance (Ш): Allows a player to phone a random viewer for help on the puzzle. If an answering person guessed the right letter or a word, he or she wins a prize. The player may change the answer and receives no points for it anyway. If the player doesn't want to use this space, this means 1500 points.
- Bankrupt (Б): The player loses all his/her points and their turn ends. If the same player hits Bankrupt twice consecutively, he or she wins a prize.
- 0: The player loses their turn.
- ×2: A correct choice of letter doubles the player's score. In earlier seasons, if more than one instance of the chosen letter was revealed, the player's current total was doubled for each instance of the letter (for example, if two letters, the points are quadrupled). More recently, the player earns their current score over again for each instance of the chosen letter.
- Million (М): The player has the chance of winning one million rubles. The player is presented with two bags. One has one million rubles inside and the other contains bagels. The player does not have to go for it if he or she doesn't want to.

A player may attempt to solve the puzzle during his or her turn either before spinning the wheel or after, when they are able to call a letter. If that player correctly solves the puzzle after spinning the wheel, without first calling a letter, he or she receives the highest point value on the wheel for each instance of the un-revealed letter. The word must be read as shown, and correctly pronounced (though some variations in pronunciation are accepted).

Each one of the first three rounds uses a fresh set of 3 players, and players are removed from the game if they solve the puzzle incorrectly, or if they accept a prize. If one player remains in a round, the player does not automatically advance to the final, but is allowed up to 3 additional turns, after which they must attempt to solve the puzzle. If the last remaining player fails to solve the puzzle, they are also eliminated and nobody wins the round.

The final round is played by the winners of the three preceding rounds using the same rules. (Because a round can end with no winner, there may be only one or two players in the final round. In the event that nobody wins a round, the final round is not played, and the game is over immediately.) The winner of the final (if any) becomes the winner of the show and can then use the points earned to buy prizes. (If nobody wins the final round due to all players being eliminated, the game is over immediately.) The point totals are not shown during the game, but are instead announced by the host when the winner begins to buy prizes.

However, the winner can also choose (but is not obligated) to participate in an additional bonus round, "Супер Игра" (the "Super Game"). In this bonus round, prizes are placed on the wheel, and the player spins to determine the prize they will play for. Then, a puzzle is presented, and the player says four letters to be revealed (if they exist) in the puzzle. The player then has 60 seconds to solve the puzzle. If the player correctly solves the Super Game puzzle, the prize is won. Failure in the Super Game means that the player loses all of the prizes that they purchased, but retains any gifts or prizes won in the main game.

In more recent years, the Super Game puzzle consists of three words - one main word written going across, and two others going up and down, similar to a crossword puzzle. The contestant wins the prize spun for guessing the main word; a car is added to the prize for also guessing the two vertical words in addition to the main word. Failure to guess the main word, regardless of whether or not the two vertical words were guessed, loses the prizes purchased. (Occasionally, the host will allow the contestant to keep one or more of the purchased prizes in the event of a Super Game failure.)

Unlike the American version of the show, the Russian version places greater emphasis on the host interviewing and socializing with the contestants than figuring out the puzzle.

=== Content rating ===
According to Russian system of television age restrictions, the current rating of the show suggests it is intended for ages 16 and above, unlike the American version which is suitable for all age groups.

== Russian cultural features ==
On the American show, the wheel spins fast and letters are guessed in a rapid-fire progression, whereas on the Russian show, the wheel is designed to spin very slowly so that the host can have lengthy conversations with the contestant. The candidates and the host are gathered around a well-laid table. An early tradition dating back to the first episodes of The Field of Wonders involves the contestants bringing in gifts for the host. For example, a contestant that works at a factory would bring in that factory's most famous product, or a contestant from a far-away town would bring in some culturally-significant item to represent where they live. Eventually, the show's production company established a museum near their studio, where these gifts are now placed for public display. Most of the candidates also bring homemade food as gifts. The moderator often tastes something of the food and it is often given out to the public. Furthermore, each of the guests brings along a musical gift, so that the guest himself or his friends, relatives, well-known acquaintances and children perform on stage to entertain the audience, the other show participants and host through singing and dancing. Often traditional songs are performed.
