= Weakest Link (American game show) =

American television game show

- Genre: Game show
- Created by: Fintan Coyle; Cathy Dunning
- Directed by: Bob Levy; Lenn Goodside; Ashley S. Gorman; Tony McCuin
- Presented by: Anne Robinson; George Gray; Jane Lynch
- Announcer: John Cramer; Lisa Friedman; Debra Wilson
- Theme music composer: Paul Farrer
- Country of origin: United States
- Original language: English
- No. of seasons: 5 (NBC, 2001–2002, 2020–2024); 2 (syndication, 2002–2003); 2 (Fox, 2025–present)
- No. of episodes: 127 (10 unaired: NBC); 324 (syndication); 18 (Fox)

Production
- Executive producers: Phil Gurin (2001–2003); Stuart Krasnow; Ruth Davis; Colin Jarvis; Lynn Sutcliffe; Ryan O'Dowd (2020–present); Jane Lynch (2020–present)
- Producer: Javier Winnik
- Production locations: Original (2001–2003): Studio 1, NBC Studios, Burbank, California; Revival (2020–present): Television City, Los Angeles, California
- Running time: 60 minutes (primetime); 30 minutes (syndication)
- Production companies: Original: Laurelwood Entertainment (NBC season 1); The Gurin Company (NBC seasons 1–2); Weakest Link Productions Ltd.; BBC Worldwide; NBC Studios; NBC Enterprises; Revival: BBC Studios Los Angeles; Universal Television Alternative Studio (Weakest Link); Fox Entertainment (Celebrity Weakest Link)

Original release
- Network: NBC
- Release: April 16, 2001 – July 14, 2002
- Network: Syndicated
- Release: January 7, 2002 – May 23, 2003
- Network: NBC
- Release: September 29, 2020 – June 10, 2024
- Network: Fox
- Release: September 15, 2025 – present

Related
- The Weakest Link

The Weakest Link (also known as The Weakest Link USA) is an American television game show that made its debut in 2001. It is an adaptation of the British television series of the same name.

The series made its debut on NBC on April 16, 2001, and with the exception of the first 3 episodes which all aired the same week, the series aired once a week for an hour as part of the network's primetime schedule. The network cancelled Weakest Link in 2002 and its final episode aired on July 14, 2002, with ten episodes left unaired. These were eventually shown on PAX and GSN years later.

While the primetime series was still being produced, NBC began developing a daily half-hour edition that would be syndicated to local stations. This version premiered on January 7, 2002, and aired for a season and a half with the last new episode airing on May 23, 2003.

In July 2020, a revival with Jane Lynch as host and executive producer was announced. The revival premiered on NBC on September 29, 2020. A second season of the revival was announced in January 2021 and premiered on March 13, 2022. A third season of the revival was announced in August 2022, and premiered on April 11, 2023.

On May 12, 2025, it was announced that the show would move to Fox for a new series with celebrity contestants, and would be titled Celebrity Weakest Link. The series premiered on September 15, 2025. On May 11, 2026, the show was renewed for a second season at Fox, and the fifth overall.

== Hosts and announcers ==
As was the case with the British version, Anne Robinson hosted the original NBC version of Weakest Link. George Gray, whose most notable hosting experience to that point was on Extreme Gong, hosted the syndicated version. Jane Lynch currently hosts the revival and also serves as its executive producer.

The show's voice-over announcers were John Cramer (NBC original), Lisa Friedman (syndicated), and Debra Wilson (NBC revival/Fox).

== Rules ==
For the original American run and also with the 2020 revival, the game was conducted in the same way as the British version, with a team of contestants trying to reach and bank a set target within the time limit by completing a chain of correct answers that would be broken with an incorrect answer or if a contestant decided to bank the money that was already in the chain by either saying the word "bank" before the question was asked to them or (in the reboot version) saying "bank" and pressing a button on their podium. (In the reboot version, perfect chains were automatically banked.) On NBC, the team was composed of eight people (six on a special half hour episode featuring contestants from the first season of Survivor aired on May 10, 2001, and five on a special celebrity edition aired during the 2001 NBA Finals) looking to win up to US$1,000,000 (US$500,000 for the NBA special). In the syndicated series, teams were reduced to six contestants and the potential top prize was significantly reduced. The first season offered a potential top prize of US$75,000, and the second season saw that figure increased to US$100,000.

The game starts with the winner of a backstage draw before the show began (who takes the first podium from left to right; unlike other versions where they start with the player whose name comes first alphabetically). The first round is played for 2 minutes 30 seconds on the NBC series and 1 minute 45 seconds on the syndicated series, and any money banked during the round is added to the team's overall prize total. If the team banked enough money to reach or exceed the target, the round ended immediately and any excess was forfeited. When time ran out, any unbanked money was lost. Any question in progress when time ran out was discarded, with the host revealing the correct answer only if it had been fully read.

At the end of a round, regardless of the outcome, each contestant secretly votes for the person they want to eliminate from the game; they are forbidden from voting for themselves. After votes are revealed one at a time, the contestant who received the most votes is eliminated from the game and leaves with a curt dismissal from the host: "You are the weakest link. Goodbye!" In the event of a tie, a tiebreaking vote is cast by the contestant who was named as its "strongest link". If the strongest link is involved in the tie, then he/she is automatically safe and decides between the other players involved.

The time limit decreased in each round after the first (10 seconds per round on the NBC series, 15 seconds for the syndicated one). Play would begin with the strongest link from the previous round, or the second-strongest link if the strongest link had been eliminated.

After six rounds of play on the NBC series and four on the syndicated series, the team had been reduced to two members. For the 2001–02 run of the NBC series, a seventh round was played for 90 seconds (1:30) with the two remaining team members. Any money banked in this round was doubled and added to the bank from previous rounds to determine the final prize total.

The abbreviated first season of the syndicated series also used the double stakes round, which was conducted for 45 seconds with the last two contestants. The change in the potential top prize for the second season resulted in this round being cut from the show. Instead, the game ended after the fourth round and the two surviving contestants after the last vote advanced to the final round to play for the accumulated money in their bank.

Six timed rounds are played in the 2020 revival, with question values and target totals increasing from one to the next, no rounds are played for double value. The target begins at US$25,000 in the first round and increases to $500,000 in the sixth, allowing for a potential maximum bank of US$1,000,000.

=== Money chains ===
Question and target values during the NBC and syndicated runs of the series are displayed in the table below.

Question Number	2001–02 (primetime)			2002–03 (syndicated)		2020–present					
Question Number	Standard episodes	Survivor special	NBA halftime specials	Season 1	Season 2	Round 1	Round 2	Round 3	Round 4	Round 5	Round 6
8	$125,000	—N/a				$25,000	$50,000	$75,000	$100,000	$250,000	$500,000
7	$75,000	—N/a				$10,000	$25,000	$50,000	$75,000	$100,000	$250,000
6	$50,000	$125,000	—N/a	$12,500	$25,000	$7,500	$15,000	$25,000	$50,000	$75,000	$100,000
5	$25,000	$50,000	$100,000	$5,000		$5,000	$10,000		$25,000	$50,000	
4	$10,000		$20,000	$2,500		$4,000	$7,500		$10,000	$25,000	
3	$5,000		$10,000	$1,000		$3,000	$5,000		$7,500	$10,000	
2	$2,500		$5,000	$500		$2,000	$2,500		$5,000		
1	$1,000			$250		$1,000			$2,500		

=== Final round ===
The final round was a head-to-head showdown between the two surviving team members. The NBC series allowed five turns per contestant, while the syndicated series allowed three (which was previously used during one half-hour celebrity episode and one 15-minute celebrity episode). Before the round, the strongest link from the previous round was given the choice of whether to play first or second. In the second syndicated season and 2020 NBC reboot, the choice went to the second-strongest link if the two had eliminated the strongest link in the final vote.

The host would then ask one question at a time to each contestant, alternating back and forth. If one contestant missed a question, the opponent was not permitted to answer. The round ended when all questions had been asked or when one contestant attained an insurmountable lead over the other, whichever came first. The winner of this round was named the day's strongest link and won all the money in the bank, while the runner-up received nothing.

In the event of a tie, the host continued asking pairs of questions until only one contestant answered correctly, winning the bank.

== Ratings ==
The NBC version of Weakest Link started off well in the ratings, pulling 17.49 million viewers on its third episode, but quickly began to slip. The producers attempted to boost the ratings with large numbers of episodes featuring celebrities as the contestants, as well as others in which the team played on behalf of a selected charity. However, these changes caused the ratings to fall even further and accelerated the show's cancellation.

The syndicated Weakest Link performed well in its abbreviated first season and earned a renewal for a full second season in 2002, but it also experienced a sharp drop in ratings that led to its cancellation at the end of the season. Many stations opted to replace it with other programming, such as a daily syndicated edition of Who Wants to Be a Millionaire?, resulting in its being moved to an undesirable time slot or dropped altogether.

== International release ==
In May 2001, the BBC began to show episodes of the American NBC primetime version. These were billed as 'Weakest Link USA' in programming guides, although the title sequence was not altered to reflect this fact. Break bumpers and references to commercial breaks were removed and alternative credits were used (these credits were used when GSN began reairing the series). Notably, despite the show being produced by the BBC, the network's logo was not included (as was a requirement at that time for all BBC produced or funded programming) in the title sequence. The BBC did not air the thirty-minute syndicated version.

== Specials ==
Various specials aired on both the NBC and syndicated versions. Occasionally the contestants on these episodes all had something in common, such as an episode featuring celebrities, family members, contestants with the same occupation or Halloween and Christmas episodes in which all the contestants wore holiday-themed costumes. Other episodes invited back previously-losing contestants, either those who had lost in the final round or those who were eliminated in the first round of voting on their original episode. Colin Jost, then president of The Harvard Lampoon at Harvard University competed on a college edition of the syndicated version, winning $5,250. Jost later became a writer and cast member of Saturday Night Live.

Celebrity episodes were common on the NBC version, in which all participants played for charity (as is traditionally the case with most celebrity editions of game shows), and eliminated celebrities still won $10,000–$25,000 for their respective charities; for this reason, the last two words of John Cramer's opening spiel "the rest will leave with nothing" were omitted, while Anne Robinson's farewell to the final round loser was changed from "you leave with nothing" to "you will just go away".

== Records ==
The record highest amount of prize money won on the NBC version was $189,500, set by Delia Clayton in the 2002 "Tournament of Losers" episode. The highest amount won on the NBC celebrity version was $167,500, which was set by LeVar Burton won on a celebrity episode for charity. The highest amount won on the syndicated version was $53,000. A contestant named Rachel won $121,000 on a 2022 episode of the NBC revival. It was also the only game in the reboot where the bank ended with more than $100,000. In the reboot, there have been two occasions where the team manage to run the chain to the end, winning $25,000 for that round. In non-successful scenarios, the best bank (in the reboot) was $45,000, out of a possible $100,000.

== Revival ==
On July 8, 2020, it was announced that actress Jane Lynch would host a revival of the show on NBC, featuring a few modern twists, such as picture clues on the contestants' podium screens. The revival premiered on September 29, 2020. On January 25, 2021, the revival series was renewed for a second season of 13 episodes, which premiered on March 13, 2022. CTV airs the revival in Canada. On August 1, 2022, the revival series was renewed for a third season of 20 episodes, which premiered on April 11, 2023. The remaining nine episodes of the third season began airing on April 2, 2024. In Australia, the Nine Network, which aired a local revival in 2021, airs the American revival through its digital multi-channel 9Go!.

On May 12, 2025, it was announced that the show would move to Fox for a new series with celebrity contestants competing for their favorite charities, with a minimum of $50,000, and would be titled Celebrity Weakest Link. The series premiered on September 15, 2025. On May 11, 2026, the show was renewed for a second season on Fox, and the fifth overall.
