= Paul Farrer =

British composer

- Born: Paul Myles Farrer; 1973 (age 52–53); Worcester, Worcestershire, England
- Occupation: Composer
- Website: paulfarrer.com

Paul Myles Farrer (born 1973) is a British composer, best known for composing music for British game shows.

== Life and career ==
Paul was born in 1973 in Worcester, England. He has composed music for British game shows including The Weakest Link, The Chase, The Wheel, Millionaire Hot Seat, Dancing on Ice, Michael McIntyre’s Big Show, The John Bishop Show, Ninja Warrior, the short-lived 2008 revival of Gladiators, The Fortune Hotel, The Answer Run and Lucky 13 (hosted by Shaquille O'Neal and Gina Rodriguez). His music was heard in Domino in 2005. He also was the creator, composer and conductor of 1000 Heartbeats, as well as the music package for the annual 24 Hour Game Show Marathon livestream event since 2017.

Paul is a member of the British Academy of Songwriters, Composers and Authors. He was the 2003 recipient of the BMI Composer Award, won a Royal Television Society Award in 2023 for Post Production for Late Night Lycett and has been nominated on four further occasions.
