= Anne Robinson =

English television presenter and journalist (born 1944)

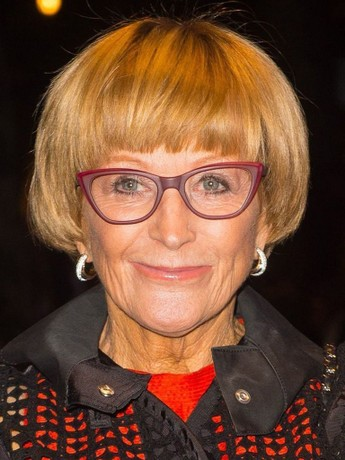
- Robinson in 2023
- Born: Anne Josephine Robinson; 26 September 1944 (age 82); Crosby, Lancashire, England
- Occupations: Broadcaster, journalist
- Years active: 1967–present
- Television: Points of View (1987–1997); Watchdog (1993–2001, 2009–2015); The Weakest Link (2000–2012, 2017); Countdown (2021–2022)
- Spouses: Charles Wilson (m. 1968; div. 1973) John Penrose (m. 1980; div. 2007)
- Partner: Andrew Parker Bowles (2023–present)
- Children: 1

Anne Josephine Robinson (born 26 September 1944) is a British journalist and television presenter, best known as the host of BBC game show The Weakest Link from 2000 to 2012, and again in 2017 for a one-off celebrity special for Children in Need. She presented the BBC consumer affairs programme Watchdog for a total of 15 years, from 1993 to 2001 and again from 2009 to 2015. Robinson hosted the Channel 4 game show Countdown from June 2021 to July 2022, taking over from Nick Hewer. She left the programme on 13 July 2022 after one year, recording a total of 265 episodes.

== Early life ==
Robinson was born in Crosby, Lancashire, on 26 September 1944 and is of British and Irish descent. Her father was a school teacher. Her mother, Anne Josephine (née Wilson), was an agricultural businesswoman from Northern Ireland, where she was the manager of a market stall. When she came to England, she married into her husband's family of wholesale chicken dealers, and sold rationed rabbit following the Second World War. She inherited the family market stall in Liverpool and transformed it into one of the largest wholesale poultry dealing businesses in the north of England.

Brought up initially at the family home in Crosby, Robinson attended a private Roman Catholic convent boarding school in Hampshire, Farnborough Hill Convent, now known as Farnborough Hill. She was hired as a chicken gutter and saleswoman during the holidays in the family business, before taking office jobs at a law firm. The family spent their summers on holiday in France, often at the Carlton Hotel in Cannes.

== Career ==
=== Early career ===
On leaving school, Robinson chose journalism over training for the theatre. After working in a news agency, she arrived in London in 1967 as the first young female trainee on the Daily Mail. Robinson's mother's going-away present to her daughter was an MG sports car and a fur coat. Robinson secured a permanent position as a result of scooping the details of the story of Brian Epstein's death from being a family friend of Rex Makin, the Liverpool solicitor handling the legalities, offering him a ride to Euston railway station when he could not find an available taxi.

Her work became more uncomfortable for her when she met and fell in love with the deputy news editor, Charles Wilson; the couple married in 1968, but he subsequently had to terminate her employment because of the marriage. Robinson joined The Sunday Times. In 1977, her inability to hand in her copy due to an alcohol-related incident led to her contract being terminated by The Sunday Times. She then began working for the Liverpool Echo.

=== Press ===
Robinson returned to Fleet Street in 1980, working as columnist and assistant editor of the Daily Mirror. She also wrote a column under the pseudonym of the "Wednesday Witch", in which she developed her vitriolic style. During her career as a newspaper journalist, she developed a flair for writing tabloid headlines.

In discussing a raise with Mirror boss Robert Maxwell, she asked for a doubling of her salary and a brand-new Mercedes to be written in her contract. Following the departure of her husband, Robinson demanded that Maxwell make up the difference in their joint income, which he did. Robinson wrote obituaries to Maxwell following his death in 1991, saying: "He left me reeling from his charm, his amazing panache and the sheer speed at which his brain worked. He was my inspiration and my hero". She later took Robert Maxwell's daughter Ghislaine "under her wing" as a journalist; Robinson later described Ghislaine and the wider children of Robert Maxwell as "broken".

Her closeness to Robert Maxwell was mocked by Ian Hislop in 1999 as a panellist on Have I Got News for You, as well as when she became the first guest presenter of the show in 2002. In Memoirs of an Unfit Mother in 2001, Robinson criticised Maxwell's fraudulent misappropriation of the Mirror pension fund (which fully came to light after his death), in which she said: "we failed to monitor what was happening on our doorstep", adding: "cowards had made his behaviour possible. Bankers, accountants, lawyers, who should have known better ... said yes when they should have said no."

On 14 November 1982, Robinson attended a formal dinner attended by Queen Elizabeth II, at which she noted that Diana, Princess of Wales, arrived late. Robinson asked the Mirror's Royal editor James Whitaker to investigate and, after conversations with various sources including Diana's sister Lady Sarah McCorquodale, confirmed that Diana was suffering from an eating disorder, named as anorexia in a scoop article on 19 November 1982. As a result, Buckingham Palace Press Secretary Michael Shea rang then Mirror editor Mike Molloy, asking him to remove Robinson. She was subsequently removed from the editorial rota, and was advised by Molloy to "do more television, blossom, that's what you're good at". Robinson has written weekly columns for a succession of other British newspapers, such as Today, The Sun, The Express, The Times, and The Daily Telegraph.

=== Television and radio ===
Robinson began appearing on BBC television in 1982, initially as an occasional panellist on Question Time and presenting her 'TV Choice' on Breakfast Time. From 1986, she began sitting in on television viewers' show Points of View for regular presenter Barry Took, taking over from Took permanently in 1988 and remaining for 11 years. In 1993, she took over the presentation and writing of the consumer affairs television programme Watchdog.

Robinson joined BBC Radio 4 to present the News Stand, Today and mid-week programme by deputising for main presenters Ian Hislop, Libby Purves and Michael Aspel for three years between 1985 and 1987 some time later she joined BBC Radio 2 by covering Derek Jameson's weekday breakfast show in May 1987 she returned to Radio 2 to present her own Saturday morning show from 1988 to 1993, she also deputised for Jimmy Young on his weekday lunchtime show for 10 years between 1988 and 1998.

In the UK, Robinson is best known for hosting the game show The Weakest Link, and in the United States its NBC primetime counterpart, Weakest Link. She originally started with an icy, mysterious appearance and persona, maintaining her deadpan delivery to funny and friendly moments throughout; however, she toned down her icy, deadpan approach over the years, with her often smiling, engaging, and on occasion, even laughing, especially on the celebrity editions. Her use of insults, caustic remarks and personal questions fiercely directed at contestants became famous. Her trenchant and curt utterance "You are the weakest link – goodbye!" became a catchphrase soon after the show started in 2000. Asked by the Duke of Edinburgh to present some Duke of Edinburgh's Awards, she agreed subject to his taking part in The Weakest Link. The Duke declined.

In 2001, she was accused of hatred towards the Welsh, after describing them as "irritating and annoying" while appearing as a guest on Room 101.

Robinson is a vocal supporter of fox hunting and, before it was banned in 2004, was a key supporter of the pro-hunt cause. The Guardian claims she has ridden with the White Horse Hunt. In an interview with Radio Times in September 2000, Robinson was asked what her first act as world leader would be, replying: "I'd lock up all the hunt saboteurs because they are destructive. They are campaigning about something of which they know nothing." In February 2002, she hosted a spin-off version of The Weakest Link in Cirencester to raise funds for the local White Horse Hunt. The event was picketed by around 100 protesters from the League Against Cruel Sports, around 70 animal rights activists returning from another demonstration joined the picket, culminating in a near riot. The event eventually went ahead after Robinson was escorted into the venue by local police.

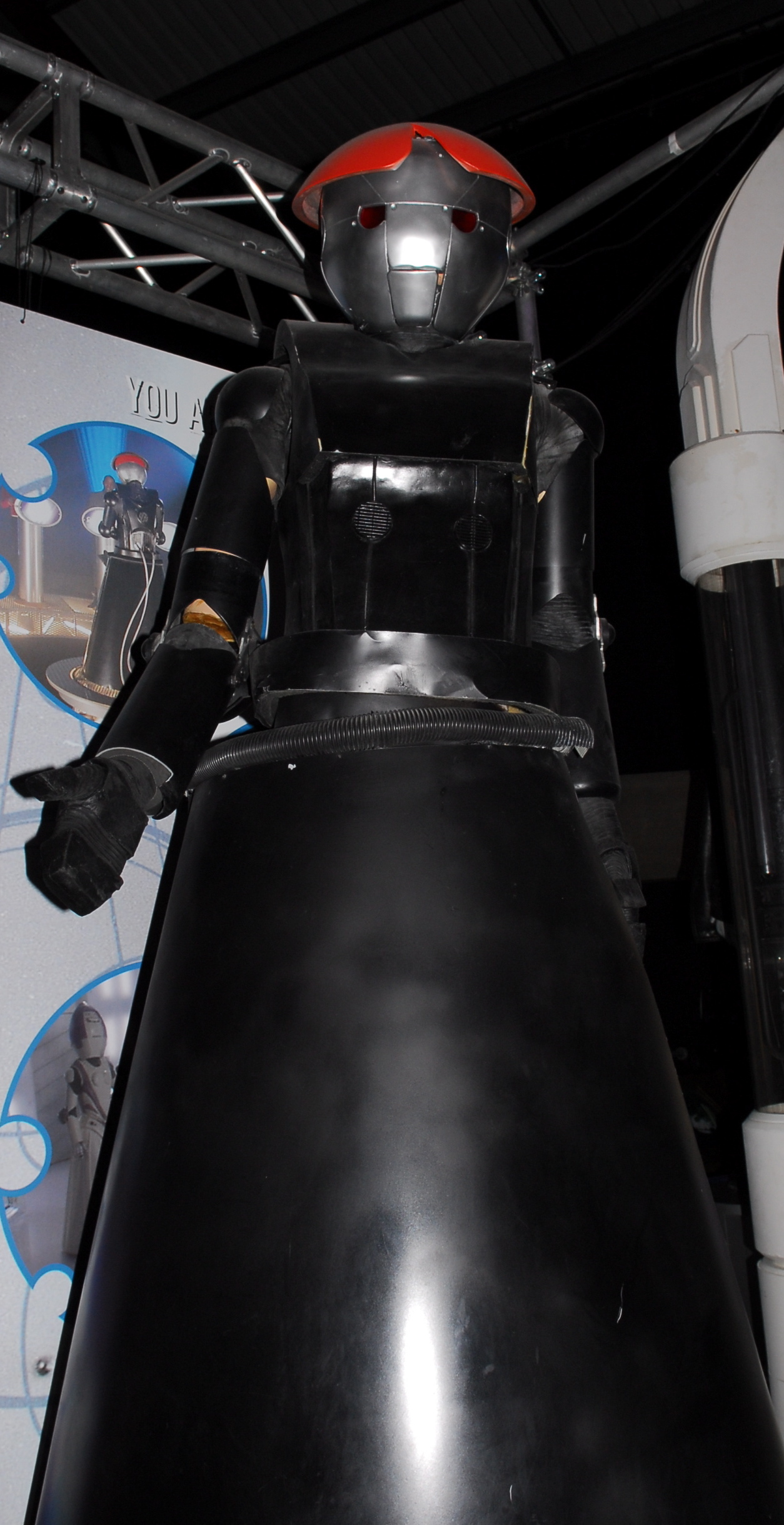
The 'Anne Droid', on display at the Doctor Who Experience

In 2005, she made an appearance on The Oprah Winfrey Show, admitting she had been an unfit mother. Also in 2005, she appeared on an episode of the revived Doctor Who, entitled "Bad Wolf", voicing a futuristic android version of herself named the "Anne Droid" on a lethal version of The Weakest Link in the year 200,100. When contestants lose as the "weakest link", the android blasts them with a disintegrator in its mouth, which really teleports them away to a Dalek fleet. Robinson hosted the BBC's outtakes programme Outtake TV until 2009. She hosted a satirical news-based chat show on BBC One called What's the Problem? With Anne Robinson, and the BBC's interactive quiz Test the Nation.

A report published in 2006, which concluded that the BBC is "endemically homophobic", highlighted as one example of anti-gay bigotry in the network Robinson's treatment of a male contestant at The Weakest Link – Celebrity Chefs, to whom she made questions such as "What do you do in your restaurant – just mince around?", and "Before you go, and bear in mind that this is a family show, what's the strangest thing you've ever put in your mouth?" The previous year she was also accused of bigotry when she told a female prison officer that she must be a lesbian.

The BBC received 16 complaints after Robinson asked wine connoisseur Olly Smith, who was competing on the celebrity version of The Weakest Link, to feel her breasts, after he described her as a "full-bodied, expensive red". The programme was broadcast on Saturday 5 April 2008 on BBC One.

Robinson caused controversy on The Weakest Link when she made former Blue Peter presenter John Noakes cry after asking "What was the end for Shep?". Shep had been Noakes's pet dog both on and off Blue Peter.

In 2009, Robinson returned to presenting BBC One's long-running consumer show Watchdog. She finished presenting The Weakest Link in 2012 following twelve years as the host of 1,693 shows. On 10 September 2015, it was announced that Robinson would step down from Watchdog once again, this time in order to film a new series of Britain's Spending Secrets for the channel. She had presented Watchdog for a total of 15 years.

In 2016, Robinson presented Anne Robinson's Britain for BBC One. The series consisted of three episodes, each focusing on different aspects of British life. Episode one was centred on parenting, episode two on the nation's love of pets and particularly cats and dogs, and the final episode focused on the nation's fixation with how they look.

At the end of October 2017 on BBC Radio's Today programme, Robinson responded to the accusations of sexual abuse made against multiple men which had followed Harvey Weinstein allegations published earlier in the month. She accused women of not complaining until now. According to Robinson, "40 years ago, there were very few of us women in power and, I have to say, we had a much more robust attitude to men behaving badly". At the present time, she said, there "is a sort of fragility amongst women who aren't able to cope with the treachery of the workplace". Referring to an allegation made against the trade minister Mark Garnier about him asking a female assistant to buy sex toys: "It shouldn't be happening but, on the other hand, why have women lost confidence". She said this incident led her to be "in despair". Robinson outlined her method of dealing with the problem: "In my day we gave them a slap, and told them to grow up!" Robinson was accused of victim blaming on social media.

In February 2021, Robinson was announced as the next host of the game show Countdown, following the resignation of Nick Hewer. Her premiere as host aired on 28 June 2021, marking her return to the show after she first appeared as a guest in the Dictionary Corner in 1987. In May 2022, it was announced that she would be leaving the show after just one year with immediate effect. Her last episode aired on 13 July 2022. In total, she recorded 265 episodes of Countdown.

In 2025, Robinson presented You Be the Judge: Crime and Punishment, a show broadcast on 6 May on Channel 5.

== Personal life ==
Robinson married the journalist Charles Wilson in 1968. In 1970 the couple had a daughter, Emma Wilson, who became a radio disc jockey and has also hosted Scaredy Camp, a game show in the United States on the Nickelodeon network. In 1973, Robinson lost a custody battle for Emma, her only child, then aged two. Charles Wilson was granted sole custody, care and control of Emma, who subsequently lived with her father until she left home at 16 for boarding school.

An admitted alcoholic, Robinson stopped drinking on 12 December 1978 after picking her daughter up from school and driving to a petrol station to buy a bottle of vodka, and then seeing her daughter cry as she drank it. Robinson joined Alcoholics Anonymous later that year. She was also previously a smoker, and quit in 1991.

Robinson married journalist John Penrose in 1980. On 30 September 2007, the couple announced that they were planning to divorce, citing irreconcilable differences. In 2001, she published her autobiography, Memoirs of an Unfit Mother, in which she talks about her early life with her domineering mother, her marriage to newspaper editor Charles Wilson, and her subsequent battle with alcoholism that led to the breakdown of her marriage and a custody battle with Wilson for their daughter, which Robinson lost.

In 2001, Robinson was diagnosed with skin cancer, and had surgery to treat it.

In 2017, Robinson revealed that she had an abortion in 1968. She described feeling "the most terrible black doom" that lasted for months. Robinson shared her experience on the BBC Two documentary Abortion on Trial.

Robinson has two grandchildren. In December 2023, it was reported that she was in a relationship with Andrew Parker Bowles, the former husband of Queen Camilla. Robinson later confirmed this in an interview for Saga Magazine in May 2024, clarifying that the couple had been dating for more than a year.
