= The Weakest Link (British game show) =

British television quiz show (2000–2012, 2017, 2021–)

- Genre: Quiz show
- Created by: Fintan Coyle and Cathy Dunning
- Presented by: Original series: Anne Robinson; Revival: Romesh Ranganathan
- Narrated by: Original series: Jon Briggs; Revival: Julie Hesmondhalgh
- Theme music composer: Paul Farrer
- Country of origin: United Kingdom
- Original language: English
- No. of series: 16
- No. of episodes: 1,734

Production
- Running time: 45 minutes (daytime; primetime, 2021–present); 60 minutes (primetime, 2003–2009)
- Production companies: Original: BBC; Revival: BBC Studios Entertainment Productions

Original release
- Network: BBC Two; BBC One
- Release: 14 August 2000 – 31 March 2012
- Network: BBC Two
- Release: 17 November 2017
- Network: BBC One
- Release: 18 December 2021 – present

Related
- Weakest Link (American game show)

The Weakest Link is a British television quiz show, mainly broadcast on BBC Two and BBC One. It was devised by Fintan Coyle and Cathy Dunning and developed for television by the BBC Entertainment Department. The game begins with a team of nine contestants (eight in the revival), who take turns answering general knowledge questions within a time limit to create chains of nine correct answers in a row. At the end of each round, the players then vote one contestant, "the weakest link", out of the game. After two players are left, they play in a head-to-head penalty shootout format, with five questions asked to each contestant in turn, to determine the winner.

== History ==
Title card for the original daytime and primetime series (2000–2017)

The first original episode was broadcast on 14 August 2000. The show was presented by Anne Robinson and narrated by Jon Briggs. It ran in different variations, originally as a daytime series, but also at primetime and with celebrity contestants playing for charity with a modified set and format. The format has since been produced around the world, most notably in the United States, where Robinson was the original presenter.

On 22 April 2011, Anne Robinson announced that she would end her role as the quiz show's presenter by the time her contract would expire as she had served longer than she had originally intended. The original run ended on 31 March 2012 with its 1,693rd, and final episode.

=== Revivals ===
In November 2017, The Weakest Link returned for a celebrity Children in Need edition, marking the 1,694th episode of the programme. The 40-minute edition aired on 17 November 2017 on BBC Two at 10pm GMT.

In June 2021, a 12-episode primetime revival with celebrity contestants and Romesh Ranganathan as host was announced. The revival premiered on BBC One on 18 December 2021. In March 2022, the revival was renewed for a second series, which premiered on 17 December 2022. In February 2023, the revival was renewed for a third series. A special one-off late night edition, with Ranganathan continuing as host, was produced for Comic Relief 2026 and was aired on the night of the telethon.

== Format ==
The original format features nine contestants, who take turns answering general knowledge questions. The objective of every round is to create a chain of nine correct answers in a row and earn an increasing amount of money within a time limit. If a question is answered incorrectly, the chain is broken, and any money earned is lost. Before a question is asked, a contestant can call out "bank", which means that the money earned is safe, but a new chain begins from scratch. A contestant's decision not to bank, in anticipation of being able to correctly answer the upcoming question allows the money to grow, as each successive correct answer earns proportionally more money.

When the allotted time for every round ends, any money which is not banked is lost, and if the host is in the middle of asking a question, or has asked a question but the contestant has yet to answer, the question is abandoned. If the question is completed, the host gives the correct answer whether the contestant is able to answer the question correctly or not. The round automatically ends if the team successfully reaches the maximum amount for the round before the allotted time expires, and the next person says "Bank", or (in the revival) says "bank" and presses a button on their podium. Round 1 starts with 3 minutes on the clock (2 minutes and 30 seconds on the revival), every round thereafter (except round 8) is reduced by 10 seconds as players are eliminated. For Round 8, the last or final round, the remaining two players only have 90 seconds (1:30) to triple whatever they bank.

In the original series, the first person to be asked a question in the first round was the player whose name was first alphabetically. In the revival, it is a randomly chosen player. Every subsequent round starts with the "strongest link"—the player with the most correct answers from the previous round, unless that person has been voted off, in which case the second strongest link answers first.

Seven timed rounds are played in the 2021 revival, with question values and target totals increasing every two rounds. The final round is played for double value. The target begins at £2,500 in the first round and increases to £10,000 in the seventh (the real target of which is £20,000), allowing for a potential maximum bank of £50,000.

=== Money chains ===
Question and target values during the daytime and primetime runs of the series are displayed in the table below.

Question Number	Daytime episodes	Champions League		Primetime episodes	2017 Children in Need Special	2021 Revival (per round)			
Question Number	Daytime episodes	Version 1	Version 2	Primetime episodes	2017 Children in Need Special	1–2	3–4	5–6 (Note: For the first two series of the 2021 revival, the chain was £7,500-£5,000-£2,500-£1,500-£1,000-£750-£500-£250.)	7
9	£1,000	—N/a		£5,000	—N/a				
8	£800	£2,500	—N/a	£4,000	—N/a	£2,500	£5,000	£7,500	£10,000
7	£600	£2,000	£2,500	£3,000	£2,500	£1,500	£2,500	£5,000	£7,500
6	£450	£1,500	£1,750	£2,250	£1,500	£1,000	£1,500	£3,000	£5,000
5	£300	£1,000		£1,500	£500	£750	£1,000	£2,000	£2,500
4	£200	£500		£1,000	£250	£500	£750	£1,500	
3	£100	£200	£250	£500	£100	£250	£500	£1,000	
2	£50	£100		£250	£50	£100	£250	£500	
1	£20	£50		£100	£20	£50	£100	£250	

=== Voting and elimination ===
At the end of every round, contestants must vote one player out of the game. During the voting process, the narrator reveals to the viewers, though not the players, who the statistical strongest and weakest links were. While the contestants work as a team when answering questions, they are at this point encouraged to be ruthless with one another. Players often decide to vote off weaker rivals, but occasionally decide to eliminate stronger players as well, in hope that it then improves their chances of winning the game. Following the revealing of the votes, the host will interrogate the players on their choice of voting, the reasons behind their choice, as well as their performance, background and their interests. Following interrogation, the player with the most votes is given a stern "You are the weakest link. Goodbye!" or "I'm sorry to say that with [#] votes, you are the weakest link. Goodbye!" and must walk off the stage in what is called the "Walk of Shame". The eliminated contestant then delivers a brief confessional, summing up the experience of the show and occasionally taunting the team for voting them off, as well as providing opinion as to who is voted off next, and who is likely to win.

In the event of a tie or draw, the strongest link must decide which of the tied players is eliminated. The strongest link is allowed to change their vote if they voted for one of the tied players; they usually do not, unless a different player voted for their elimination.

==== Final round ====
The last two contestants work together in the eighth and final round identical to the previous ones, however, all money banked at the end of this round is tripled and added to the current money total, forming the final total for the game. At the end of this round, there is no elimination, with the game instead moving to the head-to-head round.

==== "Head to head" round ====
For the head-to-head round, the remaining two players are each required to answer five questions each in a penalty shootout format. The strongest link from the previous round chooses who goes first. Whoever has the most correct answers at the end of the round wins the game. In the event of a tie, the game goes to Sudden Death. Every player continues to be asked questions as usual, until 1 person answers a question correctly and the other incorrectly.

The winner of the game is declared "the strongest link" and takes home all of the money accumulated in the prize pool for the game, and the loser leaves with nothing, like all previous eliminated players. In daytime episodes, the maximum possible winnings are £10,000; in primetime and special celebrity charity episodes, the maximum is £50,000.

== Special editions ==
=== Prime-time versions ===
Following the huge success of the show in its early evening slot on BBC Two, a separate weekly prime-time version was added to BBC One, usually broadcast on Wednesday evenings. These versions of the show were produced on a larger budget than the daytime version, with the addition of higher jackpots and a larger set that included electronic podiums and a studio audience, but had the same rules as the daytime version.

==== Early incarnations ====
The first primetime version of the show was Weakest Link: Champions' League, which premiered a few months after the original daytime run on 31 October 2000 and ran on Tuesdays. These episodes featured eight previous winners who battled it off once again for a doubled jackpot of £20,000 (with a money tree of £50-£100-£200-£500-£1,000-£1,500-£2,000-£2,500; with the 7th round being a double round for £5,000). Six editions of this version were produced and were not successful in ratings. Although another episode that aired a week after also featured returning contestants, consisting of contestants who deemed themselves to be unfairly voted out previously.

The second series of the prime-time editions saw a format change, with seven new contestants playing for the £20,000 jackpot (with a money tree of £50-£100-£250-£500-£1,000-£1,750-£2,500; the 6th round being a triple round for £7,500) and the programme length reducing to 35 minutes instead of 40. These episodes normally featured standard contestants with some celebrity editions and ran from January to March 2001 on Mondays, with the last of the series airing on a Thursday.

==== Celebrity editions ====
The third series saw yet another format change for the prime-time editions. The podiums were increased to the standard nine, and the potential prize money was raised to £50,000. With this, the prime-time version increased back to forty-five minutes. Once again, new regular contestants played with occasional celebrity editions, but this had transitioned exclusively to celebrities playing for charity by the fourth series in 2002, and this remained as such until the original show's end.

Although Briggs and Robinson state that 8 players will leave with nothing, normally the losing celebrities receive a "house" amount to give to their chosen charity, as well as their own fee for appearing on the show. In some celebrity editions, two celebrities have represented one position in the game, with the two conferring before giving their answer. There have also been several editions featuring entirely celebrity couples. A Christmas edition of the programme was also aired in some years. Some contestants, such as Christopher Biggins, Peter Duncan and Basil Brush, have appeared several times.

These editions tended to have a theme in relation to what celebrities were featured, such as a puppet edition where a Robinson puppet introduced the show.

=== Daytime editions ===
The daytime version has also seen its share of variants.

The first edition to feature celebrity contestants aired on 24 December 2000, featuring nine celebrities attempting to win £10,000 for a charity of their choosing. As it was simply a special of the daytime series, it didn't feature any of the additions seen in the prime-time version. Shortly after, there were a few specials that aired between 2001 and 2002 that were similar to that of Champions' League featuring returning contestants, although once again these were just standard daytime episodes.

An April Fools' Day show that aired in 2003 featured Robinson being strangely and uncharacteristically nice to the contestants and abandoning her traditional black wardrobe in favour of a metallic pink overcoat. The nice nature of the episode even extended to the normally stoic narrator being much more excited and optimistic in his narration. However, Robinson did not remain kind to the contestants for the entire episode, resuming her old behaviour after declaring the winner and contestants as "so stupid".

Another variant of the daytime show was the 1,000th episode, which aired in December 2006, with the contestants featured being fan-favourites from previous editions (mostly from the prime-time series). Much like the prime-time version, a studio audience (consisting of previous contestants from the daytime series) was added, although gameplay rules remained the same, with the potential prize money remaining at £10,000. The show's first winner, David Bloomfield was one of the returning contestants, and was asked the question: If there have been 1,000 episodes of The Weakest Link, each with 9 players, how many contestants in total have appeared on the show? He answered the question correctly (9,000) but banked prior to it being asked. He did not win any money on the 1,000th episode and was voted off in only the 3rd round, despite having been the strongest link in the first two rounds. In the end, Miss Evans (who had previously appeared on the Strong Women special but had lost out to curate Emma Langley) defeated Basil Brush, winning £2,710, which she split with her co-finalist to give to charity. Robinson then announced that a bonus of £1,000 would be added to the final total, as it was the 1,000th episode, resulting in a final total of £3,710, or both contestants receiving £1,855 each. It also marked the first time that Anne Robinson did not say the phrase "...you leave with nothing." to the losing contestant.

=== Final daytime episode (2012) ===
The 1,693rd episode was titled "You are The Weakest Link - Goodbye" and aired on BBC One on 31 March 2012. Filming for the final original edition took place on 11 December 2011. The ending of the show was the only atypical part to the last edition.

A normal daytime edition of the show was made, with some of Robinson's favourite contestants from over the years taking part, and with no audience present during filming or changes to the money tree (see above). The first round of questions was notably different and was mainly about the Weakest Link and Robinson. The last question asked was "If the Roman numeral 'X' is halved, the result can be represented by which other Roman numeral?", the answer being "V". The last UK winner was Archie Bland, the editor of The Independent newspaper's Saturday edition, who won £2,090.

A short montage of clips from the show was shown at the end of the game. After saying goodbye, all of the lights turned off with Robinson being the only person left in the studio. The programme was eventually replaced by the Alexander Armstrong-fronted Pointless as the big BBC teatime quiz, which had previously aired on BBC Two since 2009.

== Success ==
Much of the show's success has been attributed to its host, Anne Robinson. She was already famous in the UK for her sarcasm while presenting Points of View and the consumer programme Watchdog, and Weakest Link saw her develop this further, particularly in her taunting of contestants. Her sardonic summary to the team, usually berating them for their lack of intelligence for not achieving the target became a trademark of the show, and her call of "You are the weakest link—goodbye!" became a popular catchphrase.

The presence of elements inspired by Survivor and Who Wants to Be a Millionaire? differentiated the programme from most previous quiz shows, as it invites open conflict between players, and uses a host who is openly hostile to the competitors, rather than a positive figure.

In autumn 2001, for the first time, Weakest Link was placed directly head-to-head with Millionaire in the television schedules. Between the two, Millionaire ultimately emerged on top, attracting 10.2m viewers compared to Weakest Link's 3.8m. Additionally, later in that autumn, due to the show's ever-rising popularity, a videogame based on the show was released for the PlayStation, PlayStation 2 and Microsoft Windows platforms.

From 9 to 13 August 2010, five "10th Anniversary Specials" aired at the usual time on BBC One.

== Transmissions ==
=== Original ===
==== Daytime ====
Series	Start date	End date	Episodes
1	14 August 2000	11 December 2000	67
2	12 December 2000	22 May 2001	87
3	20 August 2001	3 September 2002	169
3	6 January 2003		169

NOTE: This is not an exhaustive list

==== Primetime ====
Series	Start date	End date	Episodes
1	31 October 2000	12 December 2000	8
2	22 January 2001	30 March 2001	12
3	6 April 2001	24 May 2001	10
3	12 September 2001		10
3	26 December 2001	31 December 2001	10
4	18 August 2001	24 August 2002	40
4	12 September 2003	31 October 2003	40

NOTE: This is not an exhaustive list

=== Revival ===
Series	Start date	End date	Episodes
1	18 December 2021	12 February 2022	12
2	17 December 2022	29 April 2023	12
3	18 November 2023	30 March 2024	15
Special	20 July 2024		1
4	28 September 2024	12 April 2025	14
5	4 October 2025	14 February 2026	12
6	TBA	TBA	TBA

== International versions ==
The format has been licensed across the world, with many countries producing their own series of the programme and is the second most popular international franchise, behind only the Who Wants to Be a Millionaire? franchise, which also originated in the UK.

== Strategy for banking money ==
In a New Scientist blog article, Erica Klarreich argues that there are only two sensible strategies in Weakest Link (the American edition) when it comes to banking money. Either players should choose to bank after every correct answer, or after six straight correct answers to maximize the pot. The correct strategy to take will depend upon the team members' skill at answering questions. For all but the weakest teams, the optimal strategy is to raise the pot six straight times without banking. But since this happens so seldom on the show, Klarreich argues, the dominant strategy will usually be instead to bank after every question. The common practice of banking after just three questions would only outperform the strategy of banking after every question if a team maintained a success rate of over 67%.

== Cultural references ==
Anne Robinson's catchphrase "You are the weakest link. Goodbye!" has appeared in popular culture, including references in Family Guy, Scary Movie 2, How I Met Your Mother, The Garfield Show and The League of Gentlemen.

The comedy series That Mitchell and Webb Look broadcast a sketch based on Weakest Link called Hole in the Ring, featuring Robert Webb as an overly harsh presenter who makes mistakes whilst reading questions.

Two fictional television shows, Doctor Who and My Family, have depicted their own versions of Weakest Link in their episodes. The Doctor Who edition, broadcast in 2005, depicts a futuristic version of the show in the year 200,100, with only six contestants and presented by an 'Anne Droid' (voiced by Anne Robinson). A later special edition of Weakest Link features nine cast members of Doctor Who playing the game, and the show is introduced by the Anne Droid. The real Anne walks on stage almost instantly as the droid begins the show, unplugs it, and says, "I don't think so. I think we'll do that again." She then presents the show herself and proceeds as normal.

In the seventh series of the British television show My Family, broadcast in 2007, the main characters Ben, Susan, Janey, Michael, Abi, Roger, and Alfie, along with Susan's mother and her husband, compete on the show for a special family edition, after Michael forges all of their signatures to get on it. The real Anne Robinson guest stars as the host.

== See also ==
- List of international television show franchises
