= 1st channel Ostankino =

Ostankino 1st Channel 1-й канал Останкино
- Country: Russia
- Network: RGTRK Ostankino
- Headquarters: Ostankino Technical Center, Moscow, Russia

Programming
- Language: Russian

Ownership
- Owner: Government of Russia
- Sister channels: 4th channel Ostankino; Programme Six

History
- Launched: 27 December 1991; 34 years ago
- Founder: RGTRK "Ostankino"
- Replaced: Programme One
- Closed: 1 April 1995; 31 years ago
- Replaced by: Public Russian Television

Ostankino 1st Channel (Russian: 1-й канал Останкино, romanized: 1-y kanal Ostankino) was a national Russian television channel, on which the Russian State Television and Radio Broadcasting Company "Ostankino" broadcast. The editorial offices and studios of the television and radio company, from which it broadcast on it, were located in the Ostankino Technical Center.

== History ==
=== 1991–1992: Foundation and start of broadcasting ===
On December 27, 1991, in connection with the termination of the activities of state bodies of the USSR and the formation of the CIS, and also in order to ensure the functioning of interstate broadcasting within the CIS, the All-Union State Television and Radio Broadcasting Company was liquidated, and on its basis, the State Television and Radio Broadcasting Company "Ostankino" was formed, to which all television and radio broadcasting frequencies on which the television and radio company broadcast were transferred, as well as the production of all television and radio broadcasting programs of the former All-Union State Television and Radio Broadcasting Company. Central Television became Ostankino Television, and the First Program of Central Television became known as Channel 1 Ostankino. The State Television and Radio Broadcasting Company "Ostankino" was entrusted with the function of covering political, cultural and economic life in the CIS member states. Yegor Yakovlev became the Chairman of the State Television and Radio Broadcasting Company.

=== Broadcast schedule in 1992 ===
At the initial stage, there were few changes compared to the last years of the existence of the Soviet Central Television. The news program was Novosti, and the information and analytical program was Itogi with Yevgeny Kiselyov. The channel's logo was a stylized image of a unit enclosed in a square. Since 1992, the socio-political talk show "Tema" with Vladislav Listyev, the analytical talk show "Red Square" with Alexander Lyubimov and the program "Politburo", hosted by Alexander Politkovsky began to be broadcast. The producer of these programs was the television company VID.

=== 1992–1994. Management disagreements and financial problems ===
The main problem of the activities of the State Television and Radio Broadcasting Company Ostankino was the "spread" of advertising among thematic studios, which began during the existence of the USSR State Television and Radio Broadcasting Company. In 1990–1991, three thematic studios received the status of legal entities, including the Experiment studio, which was the main customer for the production of television programs at JSC VID Television Company. At the beginning of 1992, instead of almost all other thematic main editorial offices of Central Television, thematic studios of the State Television and Radio Broadcasting Company Ostankino were created; for example, ITA had its own advertising department. Some of the studios paid private television organizations for the programs produced to their order with their advertising time. The Main Advertising and Commercial Directorate itself was created only in May 1993; the Ostankino Advertising Agency, which operated before that, only placed advertising between programs.

In the summer of 1992, Eduard Sagalaev created MNVK, which took over the evening of 6 TVK in Moscow (from 1993 to 1994, economic and educational programs of the Severnaya Korona television company were broadcast on Channel 6 in the morning and afternoon). Instead of Eduard Sagalaev, Igor Malashenko, who had previously been its political director, became the general director of the television and radio company.

In the fall of 1992, Russian businessmen founded the OITV company in Israel, which since the fall of 1993 has been retransmitting the signal of one of the belt versions of 1st channel Ostankino abroad. In particular, such a version of the channel was broadcast in Israel itself, in early February 1994 in Transnistria, for some time in Ukraine, and from the beginning of 1994 in some cities in the European part of Russia. Israeli Russian- and English-language advertising was broadcast on Ostankino International Television, sometimes blocking the broadcasts. The exact fate of OITV is unknown: presumably, it stopped broadcasting after the launch of ORT, in April–May 1995.

On October 4, 1992, the broadcast of George Lucas's film Star Wars was removed from the air with the wording "pirated film purchased for showing without film and video rights". This was the first removal from the air on domestic television. The space saga was shown on Channel One only 13 years later, in 2005, with stereo sound.

On November 24, 1992, Yegor Yakovlev was dismissed due to the showing of a film about the war between Ingushetia and North Ossetia–Alania. On January 11, 1993, Vyacheslav Bragin was appointed Chairman of the Russian State Television and Radio Broadcasting Company "Ostankino". Due to disagreements over the methods of managing the television and radio company, Igor Malashenko left the post of General Director, and his place was taken by Oleg Slabynko.

Under the leadership of Bragin and Slabynko, the channel began to work more often in the interests of Boris Yeltsin, while state censorship began to strengthen. ITA editor-in-chief Oleg Dobrodeev and host of the Itogi program Yevgeny Kiselyov considered it impossible to work under the current conditions and, together with Igor Malashenko and businessman Vladimir Gusinsky, founded the NTV television company, which took over production of the Itogi program.

From the fall of 1993 to the spring of 1994, Ostankino experienced a large outflow of ITA journalists and employees of some other departments, who transferred to the staff of NTV Television Company LLC. Along with Dobrodeyev and Kiselyov, news anchors Tatyana Mitkova and Mikhail Osokin, who became anchors of the news program Segodnya, ITA journalists Vladimir Luskanov, Irina Zaitseva, Vladimir Lensky, Alexander Khabarov, Alexander Gerasimov, Vladimir Kara-Murza Sr., Marianna Maksimovskaya, Boris Koltsov, Mikhail Svetlichny, Andrei Cherkasov and Alexander Zarayelyan, some sports commentators, such as Evgeny Mayorov, and some of the staff of the film program studio also moved to NTV. At the same time, many employees of the television and radio company began to leave for the new channel TV-6, created by the former head of the television and radio company Eduard Sagalaev.

On October 3, 1993, during the end of the football match "Rotor" - "Spartak" at 19:26 Moscow time, due to the armed siege of the RGTRK "Ostankino", by order of Vyacheslav Bragin the broadcast of the 1st and 4th channels, OITV, as well as TV-6 and MTK, which are not part of the television and radio company, was interrupted, which was opposed by Yevgeny Kiselyov. After this, only Channel Five and RTR remained on the air, which broadcast Vesti every half hour, and also retransmitted a live CNN broadcast. On October 4 at 6:30 the broadcast was resumed, and footage of the siege was shown on Teleutra, as well as a live broadcast of the storming of the White House. After these events, Vyacheslav Bragin demanded that security be strengthened at the buildings of the television and radio company's editorial offices and studios.

On December 16, 1993, Vyacheslav Bragin resigned from the post of chairman of the Ostankino State Television and Radio Broadcasting Company. This position was initially offered to Vladimir Mukusev, but due to his conflict with the television company's staff, this candidacy was withdrawn. This position was also offered to Yevgeny Kiselyov, but he refused. Alexander Yakovlev was appointed chairman, and Oleg Tochilin was appointed editor-in-chief of the Information Television Agency.

By February 1994, Ostankino State Television and Radio Broadcasting Company and All-Russia State Television and Radio Broadcasting Company had accumulated debt to state-owned communications enterprises: as of January 1, 1996, they amounted to 412 billion rubles. At the same time, according to the deputy chairman of Ostankino State Television and Radio Broadcasting Company Gennady Shepitko, there was a government order from December 22, 1993, which instructed the Ministry of Finance to liquidate the debt (ultimately, it was never implemented), which caused a strike by communications workers on February 10, 1994, threatening to stop broadcasting programs (except for news) of both broadcasting organizations in 45 constituent entities of the Russian Federation. The employees of Ostankino State Television and Radio Broadcasting Company saw the solution in the creation of trading houses controlled by the television and radio company. Since October 1992, the commercial Russian-language television channel Orsent TV has been broadcasting on the frequencies of the Ostankino 1st Channel in Estonia at night, after the channel's broadcasts have ended. In 1993–1994, this channel's broadcasts were conducted from 5 to 6 p.m., thus, the broadcasts of Ostankino in Estonia at this time were overlapped by Orsent TV programs. A similar restriction on the channel's broadcasts took place in Lithuania: in the summer of 1994, due to the refusal of the Russian State Television and Radio Broadcasting Company Ostankino to pay for its broadcasts in Lithuania, local authorities gave the frequency of 1st channel Ostankino to the private channel LitPollinter TV. According to the concluded agreement, the channel could broadcast on the air of LitPollinter TV for only a few hours. On February 6, 1995, the LitPollinter TV channel stopped broadcasting due to financial problems, and the 1st Ostankino Channel in Lithuania began broadcasting in pure form again (however, on April 1 it was replaced by ORT, and on May 5 ORT transferred the frequency to the LNK channel).

== Broadcast schedule in 1992–1994 ==
Initially, the channel was of an informational and artistic nature. The weekday program consisted of news, popular science, cultural and educational, documentary programs, one-part television films and mini-series, distributed under the headings "Homebody", "Third Age" and "Children's Hour". However, due to the reduction in expenses on state television, which occurred in an earlier period, the channel reduced the number of programs prepared and television films produced. Over time, they were replaced by entertainment programs, which were produced mainly by private television organizations.

Since May 1992, on Tuesdays, Wednesdays and Thursdays before the evening news at 9:00 p.m., regular broadcasts of Latin American telenovelas began, displacing the showing of domestic television films from this time slot, which moved for some time to the time slot after the news at 9:00 p.m., and from September 15 on almost every day except Monday, when the multi-part television film of the Russian State Television and Radio Broadcasting Company Ostankino itself, Little Things in Life, was shown. Some airtime was given over to showing domestic and foreign films, combined into several sections (for example, In the Detective Club on Fridays from September 4, 1992). As a result of all this, the volume of production of domestic television films fell sharply, and the production capacities of the Studio Ekran and the Television Technical Center began to stand idle. The freed-up time was occupied by programs produced by private television companies, as well as Latin American telenovelas (their purchase was handled by the editor-in-chief of the Film Program Studio, Vladilen Arsenyev and then Vladimir Shmakov), television quiz shows, talk shows and domestic films, which soon gained the greatest popularity among viewers, while the popularity of films produced by Ostankino was much more modest.

On September 1, 1992, as part of the Children's Hour section, instead of repeats of domestic children's feature and animated television films, foreign animated series began to be broadcast; the repeat showing of the television film from the Third Age section was moved to the time before the news at 15:00. The broadcasting schedule of those years retained a fairly large volume of sports programs and television broadcasts, roughly comparable to what was during the times of the All-Union State Television and Radio Broadcasting Company and ORT in the 1990s and early 2000s (the Olympic Games were shown, the Russian Football Cup, the World and European Football Championships, the UEFA Champions League, the Russian and World Ice Hockey Championships, games of the Russia national football team, tennis tournaments, and to a lesser extent other sports and sports-related broadcasts).

In late 1992 and early 1993, the television game show for teenagers, Star Hour and the children's television game show, Call of the Jungles, as well as the program, When Everyone is Home also appeared.

On September 19, 1993, the program "Itogi" was broadcast for the last time. Then, from October 10, 1993, it began to be broadcast on Channel 5, and from January 23, 1994 - on Channel 4, part of whose airtime was taken up by the NTV television company. Instead of the program "Itogi", information and analytical programs "Voskresenye" with Sergei Alekseev and "Novosti Plus" with Sergey Medvedev began to be broadcast.

In 1994, a new wave of expansion of the number of programs produced by private television organizations on the air occurred. Since May 1994, the topical interview show "Rush Hour" has been aired on weekdays, hosted by Vladislav Listyev; the producer of this program was the television company "VID", and the program was aired daily in prime time, at 19:10. The host of the program Tema was Lidiya Ivanova. The program "Red Square" also resumed its broadcast under the old name "Vzglyad", hosted by Alexander Lyubimov, and six months before that, the program "Politburo" resumed its broadcast. Cultural and educational programs began to be aired in prime time - So That They Remember" and "Silver Ball". Since the end of 1993, talk shows produced by the ATV television company began to be broadcast on Mondays: We and If, hosted by Vladimir Pozner, and A Man and a Woman with Kira Proshutinskaya. Children's programs and programs for teenagers ("Good night, little ones!", "Early in the morning", "Marathon-15", "Do 16 and older", "Call of the jungle"), a program for schoolchildren "Once upon a time" and the program "While everyone is at home" began to be produced by another non-state television company - Klass!, which was formed on the basis of Ostankino's own Studio of Children's and Youth Programs. In certain periods, private television organizations produced up to 70% of television programs, excluding news, films and archival recordings.

Since July 4, 1994, due to the cutback in funding for Ostankino State Television and Radio Broadcasting Company and the need to reduce the broadcasting time of 1st channel Ostankino to 12 hours, a technical break was added to the channel's weekday program from 11:20 to 16:00. At this time, as well as in the night program from 1:00, since August 1, 1994, Ostankino State Television and Radio Broadcasting Company and JSC Global Mass Media System began offering airtime to non-state broadcasting television companies, thereby, the above-mentioned time de jure ceased to belong to Ostankino State Television and Radio Broadcasting Company, passing to a private television company. GMS took on the compilation of a program digest, on the basis of which Igor Krutoy's firm ARS, commissioned by the television company, produced the television program Compass GMS. Advertising placement was subordinated to GMS's own advertising agency. The GMS weekday program usually consisted of 8-minute news releases every hour, two repeat showings of feature films (since October 1994 - one film) and some kind of cultural, educational or entertainment program. By the beginning of September, it became available in twelve more cities in Russia, while in the remaining cities there was a break in broadcasting during the daytime.

At the same time, in some neighbouring countries, the channel did not broadcast at all due to the peculiarities of time zones.

A new broadcasting schedule was adopted on October 3, 1994: from now on, news releases were broadcast at the 52nd minute of each hour, overlapping programs that were broadcast at that time, the timing of each news release was 8 minutes (such a broadcasting schedule initially existed on GMS). The Vremya programs (as the 21:00 news broadcasts were again called in December 1994) were not affected by these changes.

=== 1994–1995: Floating of ORT and liquidation of RGTRK Ostankino ===
At the end of 1994, RGTRK Ostankino demanded that non-state television companies "share" some of their prime time, which meant closing some of the programs of non-state television companies. Then the television companies "VID", "ATV", "REN-TV" and "Klass!" created the Association of Independent Television Producers, which came up with the initiative to create Public Russian Television (ORT), the majority of whose shares would belong to various business representatives. Broadcasting on Channel 1 Ostankino was supposed to go to it. Back in April 1994, JSC Reklama-Holding was created with a 30% share of RGTRK Ostankino in the authorized capital; other shareholders were other advertising agencies that acted as intermediaries for the television and radio company in the sale of advertising time: Video International, Premier SV, Maxima, InterVID, Logovaz-press and the Oster studio. This joint-stock company was given the right to place advertising on the channel. In early 1995, RGTRK Ostankino's share was bought out by the Independent Advertising and Information Alliance, which united the advertising agencies Aurora, InterVID, VideoArt, Kontakt and Strong, which began to lure clients by offering discounts on advertising placement that reached 80%, soon after which the advertising market collapsed. RGTRK Ostankino did not receive any dividends for 1994 from the holding, and the holding's debt to the television and radio company as of July 1, 1995 amounted to 19.0 billion rubles.

According to the decree of the President of the Russian Federation of November 29, 1994, it was envisaged to transfer airtime on the first federal program to the joint-stock company Public Russian Television (ORT), 51% of whose shares belonged to the state, with the possibility for RGTRK Ostankino to become one of its founders. According to the initial proposal, 15% each belonged to the private television organizations Television Company VID, ATV, Television Company REN-TV, and RTV-Press, 20% to the bankers, and 20% to the state. This joint-stock company was founded at its all-Russian constituent meeting of shareholders on January 24, 1995. Vladislav Listyev was appointed General Director of ORT, Badri Patarkatsishvili and Kirill Ignatyev were appointed his first deputies, and the chairman of the board of directors of ORT was the chairman of the Russian State Television and Radio Broadcasting Company Ostankino, Alexander Yakovlev. ORT broadcasting was originally planned to begin on February 1, 1995. A decision was also made to introduce a moratorium on advertising from March 1. But on the evening of that very day, Listyev was killed in the entrance to his own home three hours after the Rush Hour program. The next day, all central Russian channels (Channel 1 Ostankino, RTR, NTV, TV-6, 2x2 and MTK, except Channel 5) showed only news programs and video reports dedicated to the memory of the journalist in the first half of the day, and from 12 to 19 o'clock a static intro was broadcast "Vladislav Listyev was killed". From 19:00 to 21:00 Moscow time, all central channels simultaneously broadcast a live broadcast of a special edition of the talk show "Rush Hour" dedicated to Listyev, and then an evening in memory of the TV presenter in the Ostankino concert studio, at which friends and colleagues of the deceased performed. On March 20, Sergei Blagovolin became General Director of ORT.

On January 6, 1995, the Studio of Film Programs and the Studio of Literary and Artistic Programs, which had been preserved since the time of the Central Television of the USSR, merged into one studio, “Art.” It was given the production of all programs and cycles on the topic of art, culture, and cinema. Its director was Midkhat Shilov, who had previously been responsible for literary and artistic editing.

=== Closure ===
On April 1, 1995, the channel's frequencies were transferred to ORT. News broadcasts, as before 1994, began to be broadcast on the usual schedule, at 9:00, 12:00, 15:00, 18:00 and after midnight with a duration of 20 minutes. The announcer service was abolished (now announcers did not work on camera). Daytime breaks were also excluded from the broadcasting grid (retained in some subjects of the Russian Federation), while JSC "GMS" did not disappear from the air - it continued to broadcast under the ORT logo. For a short time, the television and radio company became the producer of a number of programs, series and cycles. Among them were: the next season of the TV series "The Little Things of Life", meetings with Alexander Solzhenitsyn, "Play, My Favorite Accordion!", etc. In addition, its area of responsibility included organizing sports broadcasts and providing Soviet feature films and animated films for reruns. In addition, ORT worked in the editorial premises of the Russian State Television and Radio Broadcasting Company "Ostankino" and on equipment belonging to it, and at the entrance to the first entrance of the Ostankino television center for some time there were two signs next to each other: Russian State Television and Radio Broadcasting Company "Ostankino" and "Public Russian Television" (with the state emblem). The information television agency continued to produce news for the ORT television channel, the Vremya program, the morning channel Teleutro, and the final analytical television magazine "Sunday". The main socio-political talk show of ORT was the program One on One (TV program), hosted by Alexander Lyubimov, and the hosts of the program "Rush Hour" were Sergei Shatunov and Dmitry Kiselev [228]. Many programs that survived from the times of either the RGTRK "Ostankino" or the Central Television of the USSR were closed already during the active work of ORT.

From April to December 1995, in some printed television programs, instead of ORT, they continued to indicate the name 1st channel Ostankino, which was then replaced by "Channel 1 ORT" (many printed publications and employees of the channel's broadcast used this unofficial name until the fall of 2002) or simply "ORT".

On October 6, 1995, the decree of the president of Russia on the liquidation of the Russian State Television and Radio Broadcasting Company Ostankino was published, after which on October 12 it was finally liquidated by a decree of the Government of Russia. The production of the programs Novosti, Vremya and "Sunday" was transferred to the Directorate of Information Programs of ORT, the programs "Man and the Law" and "Football Review" - to the television company "SAN-TV", which would later become the television company "Region" (in 1997 it was transformed into "RTS"), and the program "Versions" was closed and transferred to NTV. In March 1996, ITA was liquidated, and the staff involved in providing Ostankino television coverage was laid off, fired, or integrated into the staff of ORT or other channels. At the same time, some former ITA employees, such as Oleg Tochilin and Yulia Rakcheeva, transferred to the NTV television company.
