= REN TV =

Russian television channel

REN TV РЕН ТВ
- Logo since 2017
- Country: Russia
- Broadcast area: Russia and CIS nations
- Headquarters: 17/1 Zubovsky Boulevard, Moscow, Russia

Programming
- Language: Russian
- Picture format: 1080i HDTV

Ownership
- Owner: 82% — National Media Group; 18% — Gazprom-Media

History
- Launched: 19 July 1993
- Replaced: NVS; M-49 (Moscow)
- Former names: NVS (1993-1997); M-49 (1994-1997); REN TV-NVS (1997-1998); REN (2010)

Links
- Webcast: Smotrim: smotrim.ru/channel/256 (Russia only)
- Website: ren.tv

Availability

Terrestrial
- VHF: Channel 9 (nationwide)
- Digital: 11

REN TV (Russian: РЕН ТВ) is a Russian free-to-air television network. It was founded on 1 January 1997 by Irena Lesnevskaya and her son, Dmitry Lesnevsky, who had been running REN TV as a production house for other national Russian television channels. Though it focuses mostly on audiences aged between 18 and 45 years old, the network offers programming for a wide range of demographics.

REN TV's network is a patchwork of 406 independent broadcasting companies in Russia and the CIS. REN TV's signal is received in 718 towns and cities in Russia - from Kaliningrad in the West to Yuzhno-Sakhalinsk in the East. It has a potential audience of 113.5 million viewers (officially 120 million viewers) with more than 12 million of them living in Moscow city and Moscow Oblast (Moscow Region). REN TV works with 10 broadcaster affiliates and 19 cable operators in the CIS and the Baltic states; 181 cities can receive REN TV's signal. It is one of the twenty national television channels on the national digital terrestrial platform, being available on the second multiplex (corresponding to channels 11 to 20), on channel 11.

Historically the network was defined for its opposition stance, however, gradually starting in 2005, and rapidly from 2011, it began to push itself closer to the officialist narrative, a move which was criticized by TV critics. In the past, the channel was an entertainment channel, though since the early 2010s, coinciding with its new political alignment, a substantial amount of its original programming consists of documentaries with fictionalized theories, alternate history, extraterrestrials and criticism of events such as the ones in Ukraine or opposition in Russia. The conspiracy-based programming line entered into full bloom in 2017, now taking a large amount of its schedule.

REN TV also has an international version, created in 2016.

== Ownership ==
Until 1 July 2005 the channel belonged to its founder Irena Lesnevskaya and her son (30%) and the Russian utility RAO UES headed by Anatoly Chubais. In 2005 Bertelsmann's RTL bought 30% of REN TV with steel maker Severstal and oil and natural gas company Surgutneftegaz each buying 35%.

Severstal's Alexey Germanovich on 18 December 2006 ceded the chairperson of REN TV's board to Lyubov Sovershaeva, President Vladimir Putin's former deputy envoy to the North-West federal okrug and chairperson of the board at ABRos Investments, a subsidiary of St Petersburg's Russia bank. ABRos had bought a considerable stake in REN. The bank, whose chairman, Yury Kovalchuk, was a close friend of President Vladimir Putin, owned 38% of its home town's TRK Petersburg TV channel – and was likely to buy more of that company, analysts had told 19 December 2006's Kommersant-daily. REN TV and TRK Petersburg would merge into a single media holding, though they would operate independently, industry observers had told the daily.

Russian media had reported that oil and gas group Surgutneftegaz had sold its stake in the channel to ABRos, which had increased its stake in the media company from 45% to 70%. '[T]here are indications that Bertelsmann was interested in selling up, after about 18 months in the Russian TV market,' the broadcasting news website added.

Currently National Media Group owns 82%, and Russian state oil company Gazprom subsidiary SOGAZ owns 18%.

== History ==
=== Production company ===
The history of REN TV is connected to the effects of the August Coup, when former heads of Soviet Central Television Irena Lesenskaya and her son Dimitri decided to create their production company. The company was registered under the name «ЛИС и С» («Лесневская Ирена Стефановна и сын») on 19 August 1991, but due to political chaos, as well as a similar name being registered at the time («ЛИС’С», Sergey Lisovskiy), the registration was delayed. Two weeks after the coup the company was registered under the name «REN» (formally registered on 1 October 1991).

Its first programs were Astrological Forecast (13 November 1991, RTR) and the Christmas special The Irony of Fate, or Merry Christmas) (24 December 1991, First Channel of CT SSSR, days before its dissolution). These two were followed by other productions for national channels, such as To Those Who Remember, Rost's Stable, Man-to-Man Talk from Eldar Ryazanov to Boris Yeltsin Dog-Show: Me and My Dog and The White Woodpecker Club. At the time of founding, its staff consisted of only nine people, though ten years later, it rose to over 500.

=== Becoming a channel ===
In the spring of 1996, REN-TV became the main shareholder of JSC Joint Stock Company Accept, a television company that owned a license to broadcast on UHF channel 49 Moscow (occupied at the time by the local channel M—49, launched on 1 January 1994). In May of the same year, the production company REN-TV started work on the creation of its full-blown homonymous television channel. It was assumed that the schedule would consist of its existing original productions. Irena and Dmitry Lesnevsky talked about getting Channel 49 at their own disposal as follows:

Volodya Molchanov and I were in Israel. <...> And there I found a man who said that he had read somewhere in an interview that I dreamed of my own channel. And then this man, who escaped from Russia and once worked for the Ministry of Communications, said that he took a license for himself, he now had a channel in Moscow, but few people watch him — Channel 49. <...> I was given a meeting with this man who said: "I've been waiting for you! People come to me with sacks of money. But I would like to give it not to people who will make money from it, but to a production company so that there is content, so that there is television." I say, "So you're also an ideologist!" He says, "Well, I still dream of returning to Russia someday." <...> In short, we agreed on a certain amount, extending the payment for two or three years. Then he demanded more and more every time, until we sent him. But we paid him everything, and he was still complaining when we sold it — he realized that they had made a fortune out of nothing. Not only did the Kremlin want to take it away, but also the Germans came in with the money. He decided that we hadn't paid him, that we should give him some kind of percentage. But it was actually funny. He didn't put anything into it at all, except for the license.

Irena Lesnevskaya

There are four UHF channels that can be developed: 31, 49, 51 and 27. Anyone in Moscow can become accessible to the widest audience, free of charge, according to the same scheme in which TV-6 was introduced. We have held talks with channel 49. And in February we managed to buy it. <...> We bought a transmitter, a small staff of ten people, and debts that were immediately paid off. From that moment on, a new era began for us, the transition from an ambitious production company to an equally ambitious broadcasting company.

Dmitry Lesnevsky

Since that time, M-49's network started to serve as a test broadcast for the new REN-TV channel, whose launch line-up consisted exclusively of productions from its first three to four years of operation, that it made for other networks. According to the founders, REN-TV was supposed to be "an intelligent channel, a space for talented people who cannot achieve their goals on existing TV channels": It was in this "intelligent" format that the channel carried out its programming format during the first few years of operation. Under the leadership of Irena Lesnevskaya, the first generation of post-Soviet Russian journalists appeared, such as Eldar Ryazanov, Yuri Rost, Grigory Gorin, Bulat Okudzhava, Alexander Shirvindt, Yuri Nikulin, Vladimir Molchanov, Arkady Arki, and Leonid Filatov.

As a sign of gratitude for Yeltsin's support in his election campaign, REN TV received the right to broadcast in Moscow. In the fall of 1996, Moscow Mayor Yuri Luzhkov supported the creation of Irena Lesnevskaya's new TV channel and became the head of its board of trustees. It also includee Egor Yakovlev, Alexey Simonov, Alexander Kabakov and Nikolai Petrov. According to experts, the mayor's participation in the creation of the TV channel, which at that time actively provided the floor to the Moscow administration, could indicate that Luzhkov had already begun preparations for the next presidential election and had presidential ambitions. At the same time, the Bank of Moscow, controlled by the Moscow authorities, provided an initial loan for REN-TV, which was repaid a year later. Teaser videos of the TV channel began to appear on NVS in mid-December 1996.

=== 1995-2005: REN TV under the Lesnesvkys ===
On 1 January 1997, REN-TV began broadcasting instead of NVS, but at the same time it briefly left the name of its predecessor on its logo, this being rendered as REN-NVS. Initially, the channel began broadcasting between 13:15 and 17:00 Moscow time and ended it around 01:00, and the amount of airtime varied from 9 to 12 hours a day. Later, the broadcast began at 14:00. The channel was broadcast to the regions through local affiliates (Reg-TV in St. Petersburg, Network NN in Nizhny Novgorod, Afontovo in Krasnoyarsk, Everything for You in Tambov, Channel Four in Yekaterinburg, TV2 in Tomsk, Takt in Kursk, Akhtuba in Volgograd, SKAT in Samara, Expovim in Rostov-on-Don, Istoki in Orel, Bars in Ivanovo, Yekaterinodar in Krasnodar, and others), which have been receiving satellite signals since NVS existed. Until 1999, REN-TV broadcast its programs without time zone adjustments, using a single feed calibrated to Moscow's timezone, and at night and in the morning, for the network's affiliates outside the European part of Russia, it delivered a full or partial relay of the following day's schedule in order to retransmit them by partners at a more convenient time for them. On 6 September 1999, REN-TV began time-sensitive broadcasting throughout Russia, having four time zone feeds: +0 (for European Russia), +2 (for the Urals and, until 2016, Western Siberia), +4 (for Siberia, until 2016, for Central and Eastern Siberia) and +7 (for the Far East), becoming the third TV channel in Russia to launch such a service. By the end of the 1990s, the channel's broadcasting was extended to most of the country, while until 2003 it was carried out exclusively on the network principle - with retransmission in all regions except Moscow through the frequencies of its regional affiliates. REN-TV

To compete with the larger Russian TV broadcasters, the channel, led by Irena Lesnevskaya and her son Dmitry, began to actively develop its operations. Positioning itself as a general TV channel, REN-TV included news and current affairs programs, entertainment and music programs, author programs (programs produced by a single presenter), sports programs and events in its network, television series, mostly American, animated series and feature films from international catalogues.

In 1997-2016, the in-house productions were made by CJSC REN-TV, later having its name dehyphenated to CJSC REN TV. In entertainment programs, both of its own and third-party production since 2003, the legal entity Acceptance LLC (REN TV Television Channel) generally used. 70% of the programs aired on the REN-TV channel were owned by the television company of the same name.

From 1997 to 2000, 70% of the shares of the TV channel belonged to the Lukoil oil company. In October 2000 (May 2001 according to other sources,) this block of shares was bought by a subsidiary of RAO UES, the Settlement Optimization Center. By that time, the channel's share was already of 3.5—3.7% of viewers in the country (by contrast, in 1997, its viewing figures were only 1%, which was roughly comparable to STS, Channel Five and AST-2x2 and significantly less than those of the perceived competitors of the larger channels NTV and TV-6). The reason for the sale of the channel's shares was that the management of REN-TV and, personally, Irena Lesnevskaya were not satisfied with the quality of the information provided in the newscasts produced by Alexander Gurnov's news agency Television Service of News (TSN) (also owned by Lukoil), which was broadcast on the channel from 28 February to 12 June 2000. The RAO UES subsidiary did not participate in determining the information policy of the TV channel; in those years, only its managers controlled REN-TV's broadcast. The political position of the then REN-TV was in many ways similar to NTV before the scandal that caused its acquisition by Gazprom.

On 27 August 1999, the TV channel registered a domain name for its official website (ren-tv.com), said website launched in the spring of 2000. On 6 September of the same year, the channel began broadcasting at 07:00 and ended after 01:00, expanding to an average of eighteen hours a day.

Still in 1999, REN-TV began a partnership with animation studio CG-Alliance, providing financial support to it at the stage of creation. The studio, which operated at that time as the "REN-TV Animation Studio" and had a representative office on the internet at animaton.ren-tv.com, has developed and prepared the entirety of the channel's graphic package in the 2000-2002 period and the intros and graphics of some of its programs. The main characters of the channel bumpers, made in the style of CGI cartoons, were anthropomorphic televisions that showed the programs and series of the channel at the time. Later, the Ren FX division spun off from the studio, which took over the special effects for all the series on the channel.

In the spring of 2000, the TV company claimed to be on the air on VHF channel 3 in Moscow, but later, even before the competition for the frequency, it withdrew its application.

From 2002 to 2004, the channel was the official sponsor of the Saturn football club, which it branded as Saturn-REN-TV.

In 2003, REN-TV acquired its first fully-owned regional frequency outside of Moscow, starting with Chelyabinsk, where it won the license to operate on UHF channel 41. and in Yekaterinburg, where it acquired the local TV channel DIA, which at that time was its affiliate. In Vladimir, at about the same time (since 21 July 2003), the channel started its broadcasts through an affiliate, TV—6 Vladimir, which has been in operation as far back as the days of TV-6 and kept its name after its closure. Most of the acquisition of former affiliates happened after 2005. In May 2006, Nizhny Novgorod's "Seti NN" became a REN-TV-owned station. Affiliates such as Reg-TV in St. Petersburg shedded their old brands and joined the federal broadcaster's network completely on the principle of co-branding, receiving names like REN TV Petersburg and a single, unified design for its brand idendity, TV studios and relays with the federal channel.

In early 2005, the TV channel had problems with Rosokhrankultury regarding narcotic drugs and broadcasts of erotic films. The claims owed largely to the content of one of the editions of Artemy Troitsky's author-based program Signs of Life, which was no longer airing new editions in 2005, with the participation of Detsl and Ivan Okhlobystin, who discussed the harm of alcohol and drugs. and also to the airing of erotic films by the Italian director Tinto Brass (shortly before the warning was issued, REN-TV aired his explicit film "Oh, Women!", which caused a stir among the audience, and State Duma deputies accused the TV channel of showing pornographic content). The airing of such movies was temporarily suspended, though was resumed under new leadership in heavily-edited versions. At the same time, the channel's scandal involving the US satirical animated series The Simpsons case, which had first aired on the network in 2002, regarding the legality of its airing in time slots adequate for children, received a new development.

==== Programming during this phase ====
The channel's broadcast opened with the New Year's program Hello! with Eldar Ryazanov on 1 January 1997.

Initially, REN-TV had no daily news bulletins, but offered author-based current affairs programs instead: What Happened? with writer and journalist Andrey Illesh, as well as Reputation with Peter Fedorov (a look at Russia from the perspective of foreign correspondents working in Moscow). On 2 February 1998, at 19:00, the first edition of Novosti was broadcast, hosted by Alexey Gromov (formerly a news anchor on the Russian Universities channel). Initially, it had three daily editions on weekdays, since 1 September 1998, the bulletins shifted from a pre-recorded format to a live one, seven times a day every day on weekdays, as well as on weekends and holidays. On September 6, Igor Prokopenko's program Military Secret began airing on REN-TV, which in those years told about the news of Russian and foreign intelligence services.

For a long time (from the late 90s), REN-TV was known for its broadcasts of popular American satirical adult animated series (The Simpsons, Family Guy, Futurama, South Park) and the airing of Premier League and Russian football championship with commentator Alexander Elagin. REN-TV was the first in Russia to show such famous television series as Monty Python's Flying Circus, M*A*S*H and The X-Files, as well as a number of arthouse feature films.

In the 1990s and 2000s, B-movies and C-movies (including little-known ones, by analogy with TV-6 and CTC) were also included in large numbers the network. After showing a large number of action movies and other films of similar content, the TV channel was often accused by a group of patriotic activists of excessively broadcasting scenes of cruelty and violence at times children were exposed to see. Until 2009, dubbing of foreign productions commissioned by the TV channel were performed at the Kiparis Studio, dubs made for other channels or official dubs from the producers or distributors were purchased less frequently, depending on the manufacturer (in the first year of the channel's existence and then occasionally until the early 2010s, foreign films with single-voice voiceover translations were also taken for release on semi-legal or pirated videotapes).

The channel was also distinguished from others by the quality of information, analytical and journalistic broadcasts of its own production (the most famous of them are Novosti 24, The Week with Marianna Maksimovskaya, Military Secrets and Reflection). With the participation of Igor Prokopenko and Oksana Barkovskaya, REN-TV set up its original documentary production unit from scratch. Festive special programs were also produced (That's all-3000, Review-3000, The ravings of a grey mare). For the first time on Russian television, the technical technique of implanting virtual faces of famous politicians into plot sketches invented by screenwriters was tested. The innovation of the later New Year's Eve shows of REN-TV (Shallow Light, a reference to Little Blue Light on RTR) consisted in the synthesis of rock and popular music, which was atypical for Russian television.

Irena Lesnevskaya later recalled:

It seemed to me that it was possible to make good television in the most real sense, with interesting interlocutors, interesting political, musical, historical and poetic programs. From there, we will reveal the secrets that were hidden from us and tell our country about ourselves. Something that was not done, neither before nor after

Since 1998, REN-TV started broadcasting at 08:30 or 09:00 Moscow time with newscasts. In 1999, journalist Olga Romanova moved from the TV Center channel to REN-TV, where she began hosting her Fifth Column program. The channel's news service was headed by Elena Fedorova.

Since the middle of 2000, REN-TV has been actively developing its TV series unit (under the brand of the established studio «REN-film»). REN-TV's first in—house experience was the Black Room short film project, which was simultaneously broadcast on REN-TV and ORT. With the direct participation of Dmitry Lesnevsky, high-rated television series such as Soldiers, NEXT, Fighter, Nina: The Price of Love and others were produced. In 2003, its first in-house animated series, Dyatlows, was broadcast, and in 2005, the sketch show Dear Transfer (which moved to STS under the name 6 Frames in 2006). With the direct participation of REN-TV and Dmitry Lesnevsky personally, the career of the famous film director Andrei Zvyagintsev began: Lesnevsky was the producer of his first film, The Return.

Between 2001 and 2005, famous journalists and TV presenters joined REN-TV, such as Alexander Gerasimov (former employee of the "old" NTV), Anna Pavlova, Tatiana Limanova, Elena Turubara, Ivan Usachev (all are former TV-6 presenters), Egor Pirogov (former TV presenter), Gennady Klebanov (previously worked for NTV and NTV-Plus), Alexander Bovin, Urmas Ott, Vasily Strelnikov (former VJ and announcer of MTV Russia), Dmitry Yasminov, Alexander Zhestkov, Artemy Troitsky, and Ilya Doronov. At the same time, the channel hosted TV shows that had previously been broadcast on other Russian TV channels, such as Eyewitness, a program dedicated to funny and shocking videos, Big Money, The Press Club (the latest edition) and the game show The People Against.

In early 2003, the scope of the TV channel's content was significantly expanded: the management decided to strengthen the entertainment block and add to the already existing information and political programs and programs devoted to acute social problems, programs of a purely entertaining nature, both its own and third-party production. The original slogan of the, Iskrenneye, was replaced by REN with us, later REN-TV Time. In 2003-2005, the channel's creative team was replenished with journalists who had previously worked with Evgeny Kiselyov on NTV, TV-6 and TVS — among them was Marianna Maksimovskaya., Julia Latynina, Evgeny Matonin, Alexander Nadsadny, Sergey Mitrofanov, Vadim Kondakov, Andrey Kartavtsev, Artur Valeev, Dmitry Shtokolov, Vyacheslav Guz, Georgy Andronikov, Tamara Kartashova, and Sergey Naumov. Simultaneously with the latest sports news on REN-TV, a number of employees of the sports editorial office of the satellite operator NTV-Plus also joined, since, after the termination of cooperation with FC Saturn in 2005, the old sports department on the channel was actually disbanded, and its former premises were transferred to NTV-Plus's employees. Earlier, Vitaly Buzuyev, who also worked with Kiselyov, joined REN-TV.

=== New leadership (2005—2006) ===
On 1 July 2005, 30% of REN-TV's share capital, owned by its founders Irena and Dmitry Lesnevsky, went to a German-Luxembourgish company (RTL Group), and the RAO UES package went equally (35% each) to the Russian companies Severstal Group and Surgutneftegaz. The Lesnevskys left the TV channel after selling their shares. From that moment on, only the REN-Film organization was under the control of the founders of REN-TV, which in 2006-2007 was combined with the cable TV channel Mini Movie and the magazine The New Times (formerly the Novoe Vremya magazine) to form the REN Media Group holding company, no longer affiliated with REN TV.

In August 2005, entertainment producer and creative producer Vyacheslav Murugov left REN-TV for STS.

Since 14 October 2005, Alexander Ordzhonikidze, former CEO of NTV-Plus, became the new CEO of the TV company and media holding, and the TV channel was now represented by RTL Group representative Ralf Siebenahler. Ilya Kuzmenkov was appointed editor-in-chief. Stanislav Pribylov became the deputy general director and general producer of the TV channel. Cases of censorship of news items on REN-TV began to appear and received public publicity: in particular, a story about relations between Russia and Kazakhstan, as well as possible turns in the career of President Putin, were removed from the Week program. The same program did not include an interview with Zurab Tsereteli (the story with him was about the construction of a $15 million crystal chapel on Manezhnaya Square in Moscow) and a video about the closure of the case against the son of then-Defense Minister Sergei Ivanov, who ran over a woman in his car.

==== Programming during this phase ====
Almost immediately after the change of management and owners, the reorganization of the entire broadcasting network and a massive staff outflow began: several employees of the news service, headed by its head Elena Fedorova, left the channel. and the editor-in-chief of the TV program "24" Olga Shorina Olga Romanova was also suspended.

During the initial period of the new management team, new entertainment programs appeared (Brainwashers: Violence against Science, Super Nurse, the game show Deal?!) and new series ( The Students, The Tourists, Company History, Bachelor Party, or Big Sex in a Small Town, and others). The time given for sports, which had been removed from the channel three years earlier, was expanded: live broadcasts of Formula 1 races with Alexey Popov's commentary appeared (in 2007, due to Popov's return to VGTRK, he was replaced by Alexander Kabanovsky and Alexander Kaminsky and in early 2009, due to low ratings, despite obtaining rights until 2010, its broadcasts switched back to VGTRK), professional boxing fights and selected football matches. Among other things, a live broadcast of the annual Domino Day domino event also made its rounds and foreign programs and TV series as Alpine Patrol, Rebellious Spirit, Friends, Living Delicious with Jamie Oliver and The Naked Chef. According to Sergey Spiridonov, the channel's program director, the expansion of entertainment content on REN-TV was explained by the needs of its target audience: in particular, he believed that "people need to be entertained." When launching these TV shows, the German side largely referred to the experience of the TV channel RTL, whose line-up was composed primarily of entertainment programs, specifically following its philosophy of infotainment.

=== "The pure juice of TV airtime" (2006—2007) ===
On 4 September 2006, the channel began broadcasting under the updated Russified REN TV brand, now styled in Cyrillic as opposed to Latin. At the same time, the updated concept of "the pure juice of TV airtime" was launched. The leaders and owners of REN TV explained the transition to it primarily by the fact that under the old leadership the channel was distinguished by a "vague programming policy and a vague impression of the channel". The idea of the rebranding was up to RTL Group, and one of the goals of the rebrand was to increase the amount of hours to entertainment programming. All these changes were negatively perceived by the founder of REN-TV, Irena Lesnevskaya.

In the spring of 2007, program director Sergey Spiridonov and Sergey Isakov, Deputy General Director of the media holding for Regional development (both held similar positions at TV-3 and Prof-Media holding, respectively), left the channel. With their departure, almost none of the original management team remained. Soon, CEO Ralph Siebenahler, whose real involvement in the management of the channel was zero, also left REN TV and Alexander Ordzhonikidze, who combined the duties of the head of both the TV company and the channel, took over this post. From this point on, the impact RTL Group had on REN TV was minimal: despite the remaining stake, the group was no longer involved in the channel's operational management. After that, other personnel changes took place at REN TV: in particular, Alexey Abakumov, the former director of Radio Rossiya, became the editor-in-chief of the channel and its news service, and the press service was headed by Anton Nazarov.

On 2 April 2007, REN TV switched to 24-hour broadcasting (previously, the channel practiced small technical breaks in broadcasting from 04:55 to 06:00 Moscow time). Despite this, until November 2010, REN TV in Moscow went on an official overnight weekly technical break from Monday to Tuesday from 01:45 to 06:00. Also, until the end of 2010, part of the nighttime broadcast of REN TV was occupied by a block of promos, bumpers and clips, relevant in a short period of time (up to a week from the moment of the block's demonstration).

==== Programming during this phase ====
The new executives continued to pursue the same programming policy as at the end of the last TV season (2005-2006), launching a number of entertainment programs. and TV series, among them Gogol Street, For Fun, Zadov in Reality, Scheme of Laughter, Three From Above and Brothers in Different Ways. They also did not leave aside the production of documentaries, as well as news and current affairs programming - as part of the channel's line of documentaries, tapes about the murder of Novaya Gazeta journalist Anna Politkovskaya the case of Private Sychev and other cases of hazing in the Russian army were released, miners, and also about the events in Chechnya and the anniversary of the Beslan tragedy. But at the same time, films and programs on secular and "yellow" topics related to scandals and the daily lives of personalities from the world of show business began to appear more and more frequently in its documentary slot, or with biographies of famous people who had passed away, as well as revealing documentaries and films more loyal to the pro-government point of view (like Beyond Polonium about the poisoning of Alexander Litvinenko, which was shown in January 2007).

As of the end of 2006, almost none of the new entertainment programs showed high audience interest, Television critics in their publications began to point out that REN TV, which once had an individual face and style, gradually began to turn into an analog of like-minded entertainment networks like TNT or STS since the mid-2000s. After that, from January 2007, REN TV began to gradually return to a more serious line of programming. An evening line of documentaries and nonfiction films appeared at 22:00: Private Stories, Extraordinary Stories, Secret Stories, Detective Stories, High-Profile Case (previously aired separately) and Fantastic Stories. A Russian TV series was broadcast from Monday to Thursday at 20:00, a movie on Friday and Saturday, and a foreign TV series (The 4400, Supernatural and Escape) on Sunday. At 21:00 from Monday to Thursday, the TV series Soldiers was shown, which for several years was the leader in rating and share, among both Russian and foreign television series broadcast by the channel at that time. Friday evenings and weekends were almost entirely devoted to entertainment and comedy, as well as sports programs and broadcasts. Among them was Blah Blah Show Eyewitness (later divided into two parts: Eyewitness: the Most Shocking and Eyewitness: the Funniest); Sports Stars, Advertising Bummer, concerts by Mikhail Zadornov, the sketch show Distant Relatives, "Retromania" and the highly popular Adult Session (showing erotic films, including little-known softcore productions, for some time it was accompanied by thematic inserts with Andrey Bilzho). Other popular shows that appeared at the end of the season were the culinary and entertainment show Dinner Party, An Evening with Tigran Keosayan, the court show Hour of Trial with Pavel Astakhov and Mikhail Grushevsky's talk show Babi Riot.

==== Targeting a male audience (2007—2010) ====
On 6 August 2007, the channel changed the concept, logo, graphics and bumpers again and the channel began to focus mainly on men ages 25 to 54. This was primarily influenced by the fact that after Dmitry Lesnevsky left REN TV, the ratings of the channel decreased significantly.

In February 2008, the channel, alongside Channel Five and the Izvestia newspaper, joined the new National Media Group (NMG) holding company. A few months after that, gymnast Alina Kabayeva's program Steps to Success was briefly broadcast here, before being transferred to Channel Five. TV journalist Vladimir Kara-Murza Sr. stated that the presence of such presenters with pro-government views with their broadcasts on its schedule caused him to doubt the oppositional orientation it had. At the same time, Ukrainian journalist and TV presenter Alexander Tkachenko joined REN TV, where he briefly served as Deputy General Director (March—May 2008).

==== Programming during this phase ====
Since the 2007 rebrand, REN TV has ended airing its American adult animations (transferring their rights to the newly formed channel 2х2), with the exception of the eighteenth season of The Simpsons, which aired in early 2009 (the rights to show it were obtained by the previous management team), whereas national television series took their place in the weekday prime time. At the same time, there has been a tendency to increase the number of socio-political and author-based programs on its schedule: such formats include Current Reading, During Rush Hour, Reporter's Stories (appendix to the Week program), Three Corners with Pavel Astakhov and others. In the period from 2007 to 2009, other journalists who previously worked for the "old" NTV joined its team, in particular, Ksenia Turkova and Mikhail Osokin (who became the presenters of Novosti 24), and also Ivan Volgonikhin and Nikolay Nikolaev (who became correspondents of the information service).

In addition, Top Gear did not last long on REN TV. Its Russian version (adaptation of the British format Top Gear) was presented by Nikolai Fomenko Oscar Kucera and Mikhail Petrovsky.

==== Alexander Rodnyansky arrives (2010—2011) ====
In early 2010, another relaunch of the channel was carried out with the direct participation of Alexander Rodnyansky (founder of the 1+1 channel and former CEO of STS). In the period from 8 February to 31 October 2010, it was renamed simply REN. A concept was defined with the slogan Life is exciting!, the logo and graphic design changed in tandem.

In October 2010, Rodnyansky was released from operational work at NMG Holding, After that, General Director Alexander Ordzhonikidze returned to REN TV, who held a similar position at NMG from 2009 to 2010 (before his return, the channel was headed by Mikhail Kontserev, an NMG employee). People with experience at NTV gradually began to move into senior positions in the company: Mikhail Tukmachev, and Mikhail Frolov.

Since 1 April 2011, Tricolor TV suspended REN TV's relays due to lack of funds. The TV channel "TV Sale" began broadcasting at its former slot. Since 6 July, its broadcasts on Tricolor TV as part of the paid package Optimum were restored in full.

On 18 April 2011, Vladimir Tyulin, a former NTV correspondent and head of information and political programs at Channel Five, was elected editor-in-chief of the REN TV channel (replacing Alexei Abakumov).

=== Programming during this phase ===
Since 2010, new programs have appeared on the channel (dating reality show Let's Try?, pre-reality show Don't Lie to Me!), including Emergency Call 112, which was transferred from Channel Five. The main focus of this season's program policy was on serious debates and current affairs formats (Honestly!, Justice, Injustice, Greed, Sentence and others). Within the framework of this concept, the television series The Sword, The Last Secret of the Master, Cherkizon: Disposable People and sketch show Soldiers and the Officers appeared.

==== "You're with your friends!" (2011-2013) ====
On 15 August 2011, REN TV changed its logo and concept again, introducing a new style and slogan, "You're with your friends". According to Dmitry Velikanov, general producer of REN TV, the previous concept had exhausted itself in a year and did not contain a sufficient positive emotional charge.

In 2012, following the results of the 2010/2011 TV season, REN TV channel received seven TEFI Award statuettes, five of them for achievements in information and analytics.

On 14 December 2012, the channel joined the second multiplex of digital terrestrial television in Russia.

==== Programming during this phase ====
Since February 2012, REN TV dropped its roster of Russian television series in weekday prime time for unknown reasons, and their place in the schedule has been taken by pseudo-documentary, pseudoscientific and heavily biased films devoted to various versions and hypotheses of the modern world. Over time, they occupied most of the entire daily broadcast schedule. The channel's line-up on Sundays and public holidays began to consist of multi-hour marathons of TV series and films (including those from Sergey Selyanov's package: Brother, Brother 2, Sisters, Blind Man's Buff, cartoons PRODUCED BY "Melnitsa", etc.) and documentaries covering almost the entire day. A tendency to increase the amount of entertainment programs emerged — Green Cucumber, Clean Job, Hell's Kitchen, etc. One of the few premieres of a socio-political nature is the talk show Stop Being Silent! with Tigran Keosayan. which was quickly removed from schedule after two months on air, because it did not have high ratings. The Independent Investigation program with Nikolai Nikolaev in the genre of investigative journalism, which was resumed after the closure of four TV channels, did not last long. Until the end of 2013, the Ukrainian comedy show Evening Quarter (which starred future Ukrainian president Volodymyr Zelenskyy, later known for his resistance to the 2022 Russian invasion of Ukraine) was periodically repeated on the Inter and 1+1 channels; at the same time, there were cases when some statements of the team members regarding Viktor Yanukovych and his entourage were cut off on Ukrainian TV channels, but were shown in Russia.

Also, since mid-2011, REN TV gradually retreated from the clearly expressed opposition policy typical since the beginning, following a more officialist stance, launching programs such as Secrets of the World with Anna Chapman, What's Going On? with Margarita Simonyan, the editor-in-chief of the state TV channel Russia Today, and Russian Fairy Tales by Sergey Dorenko. Andrei Dobrov, a presenter known for his pro-government views, appeared in the late evening edition of Novosti 24. In November 2011, TV presenter Tatiana Limanova was fired in connection with the demonstration of the middle finger gesture while reading the text of the news about the then presidents of Russia and the United States, Medvedev and Obama. She was replaced on the air by the former presenter of NTV and Channel Five, Alexei Sukhanov.

In 2012, Alina Kabayeva's new program The Path to Olympus launched. In the same year, the sports editorial office of the TV channel was disbanded. All sports broadcasts were removed from the schedule until 2019 and the sports news editions (Novosti 24. Sport) were removed. In early 2013, the channel also stopped showing erotic films in the Adult Session, as a result of which the films of this genre completely disappeared from REN TV's inventory.

==== Under Irina Varlamova (2013—2015) ====
On 27 September 2013, Alexander Ordzhonikidze left the post of CEO, and Irina Varlamova took over this position. On 20 January 2014, the channel once again changed its logo and branding.

On September 1, 2014, the updated website of the TV channel was launched, with the domain name ren.tv. The name was registered in December 2010 by another company and was acquired by REN TV in August 2014 from an American seller for US$10,000.

On 15 October 2014, during regular maintenance work until 10:00 (Moscow time), the channel switched to broadcasting in the 16:9 format.

In November 2014, the channel announced plans to create TV channels REN-TV International and Military Secret. REN-TV International is a licensed international version of REN TV, close to the original (Russian) version of the TV channel. It planned to include current information, author-based and entertainment programs, as well as Russian television series and documentary projects. The line-up of the Military Secret TV channel would consist of REN TV documentaries, among them Territory of Delusion, Military Secret (the namesake of the channel) and Battle of Civilizations. The exact date of the start of broadcasting of both TV channels was not disclosed; the channels were set to be distributed on satellite platforms, cable and digital networks. In 2016, only REN TV International launched.

==== Programming during this phase ====
New entertainment programs appeared on REN TV, aimed for a female audience: My Beautiful Ones, 10 years younger, Four Weddings and others- The Free Time information program was launched, hosted by Alexey Egorov and former NTV and Channel One news anchor Yulia Pankratova.

In the 2013/2014 TV season, the political position of the TV channel finally changed to an officialist mindset: Week with Marianna Maksimovskaya began to radically differ from the editions of Novosti 24, while adopting such stance for its coverage of events such as Euromaidan the annexation of Crimea and the armed conflict in eastern Ukraine. This was accompanied by the departure of journalists of oppositional views from the TV channel: Mikhail Osokin left it in the summer of 2013. A year later, on 1 August 2014, Week with Marianna Maksimovskaya was removed from schedule. Most of the journalists who worked at the program left REN TV in late summer and early autumn of the same year., At the same time, news anchor Alexei Sukhanov left the channel (due to disagreement with his position)., and at the end of 2014, Marianna Maksimovskaya will do the same.

The fact that the channel's political position had changed from opposition to pro-government was noted by television critics in the future, in particular, when reviewing REN TV news releases covering the aggravation in Russian-Turkish relations., when analyzing his other broadcasts It was suggested that the channel's journalists began to cooperate more often with special services, periodically publishing videos of the events. Instead of Week with Marianna Maksimovskaya, another information and analytical program, Dobrov on Air, began to be broadcast on Sunday evenings. The network and graphics of the TV channel on public holidays have become more patriotic in nature, such as on Victory Day (9 May) or Women's Day (8 March). although earlier, in previous years, for many of them, REN TV did not have special graphics or schedule at all.

==== The Return of Vladimir Tyulin (since 2015) ====
On 16 February 2015 (around 05:00), REN TV conducted a full—scale rebranding: the logo and design changed, and the updated slogan A New Dimension! appeared. The new broadcasting concept was aimed at expanding and rejuvenating the audience. In March 2015, REN TV's former editor-in-chief, Vladimir Tyulin, returned to the post of CEO.

On 1 January 2016, by decision of the REN TV shareholders, local broadcasting in the cities where the channel's owned-and-operated stations were located was discontinued. Since then, only the federal version of the channel from Moscow is broadcasting there, and regional inserts are limited to regional advertising, sold by JSC Region Media (formerly CJSC Video International Trend). On 1 May, REN TV completed the move from its office on Zubovsky Boulevard to the loft of the Vladimir Ilyich Factory in 1 Partiyany Lane, building 57, building 3. A high-definition version of the channel has been available since 4 October. In December 2016, REN TV JSC (a television company producing information and socio-political programs for the channel), REN TV Media Holding LLC and RTL Rusland LLC were liquidated through their merger with Accept LLC.

On 2 June 2017, as part of the merger of the information services of two television companies from the National Media Group (REN TV and Channel Five), the Izvestia Multimedia Information Center became the supplier and producer of news for both.

==== Programming during this phase ====
Despite the change in concept in favor of a younger audience, programs such as Military Secret, Territory of Delusion, Chapman Mysteries and The Most Shocking Hypotheses on the topics of alternative history, conspiracy theories, etc. began to be considered among the channel's key programs. Also, after Vladimir Tyulin's appearance on the channel, a large number of documentary films of an expository or propagandistic nature began to appear, directed against people negatively perceived by modern Russian authorities, like the Anatomy of Protest. Their appearance was due to the fact that at the same time, people from the Directorate of Public Law Broadcasting of NTV (its former head, Yuri Shalimov, was Deputy General Director of REN TV in 2015-2016) began to come to REN TV, who worked there on similar programs. Petr Marchenko and Denis Soldatikov (TV presenters who did not support Evgeny Kiselyov's team during the events of April 2001 and remained to work on the updated NTV) replaced the departed presenters of Novosti 24, which was renamed Novosti REN TV at the same time. Later, in 2017, Alexey Malkov, who was the author of all the incriminating films under the heading "State of Emergency," also moved from NTV to REN TV to the position of head of public journalism programs: Investigation at the same workplace — from the "Prepaid Terrorist attack" in 2004 to the "Kasyanov Day" in 2016.

In June 2015, REN TV ended its airing of reality TV series (the series are based on stories based on real events, and their participants are played by actors), which aired on the daytime TV channel for several years (these included programs such as Don't lie to me!, Family Dramas, A Sure Remedy, Sue Me and others). The volume of non-political projects from independent producers has sharply decreased. A few months after that, the channel stopped cooperating with dubbing studios, thus, foreign films and television series new to the channel began to be broadcast in official or third-party dubbing. The number of programs representing digests of amateur videos from the Internet with voiceover commentary has increased: the programs Russian Drive-In and Good Morning! were added to the program Watch for Everyone! that appeared in 2011 (similar digests Know our people!, M and W were also shown at different times, At the Last Moment and Everyone on The Cat).

On August 18, 2017, the channel's logo and branding package changed again. The channel has expanded its range of documentary projects (Riddles of Humanity, Classified Lists, How the World Works with another former NTV presenter Timofey Bazhenov,) while these programs started airing marathon airings of several episodes on regular days, before, they were only seen on holidays. In addition, the Dinner Party cooking show was cancelled in September 2017 (having changed the name to "The Perfect Dinner", it was transferred to STS-owned Che). At the end of 2019, sports broadcasts returned to the channel, but mainly of contact sports (professional boxing and MMA) and sports news editions appeared again, this time at 23:00, with Alexander Kuzmak as its presenter.

== Logo history ==
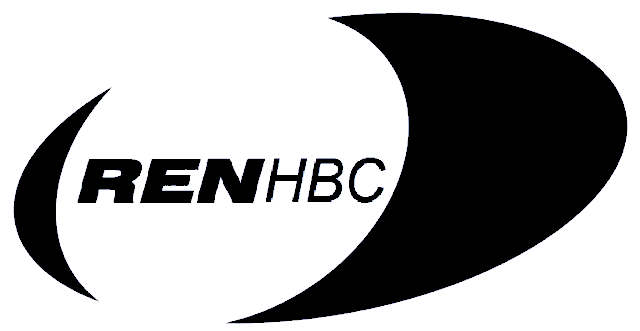
1997

1997-2005

2005-2006

2006-2007

On-screen bug

2006-2007 (black & white)

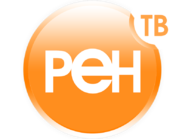
2007

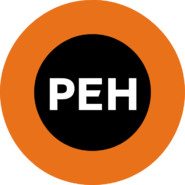
2007-2010

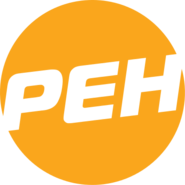
2010-2011

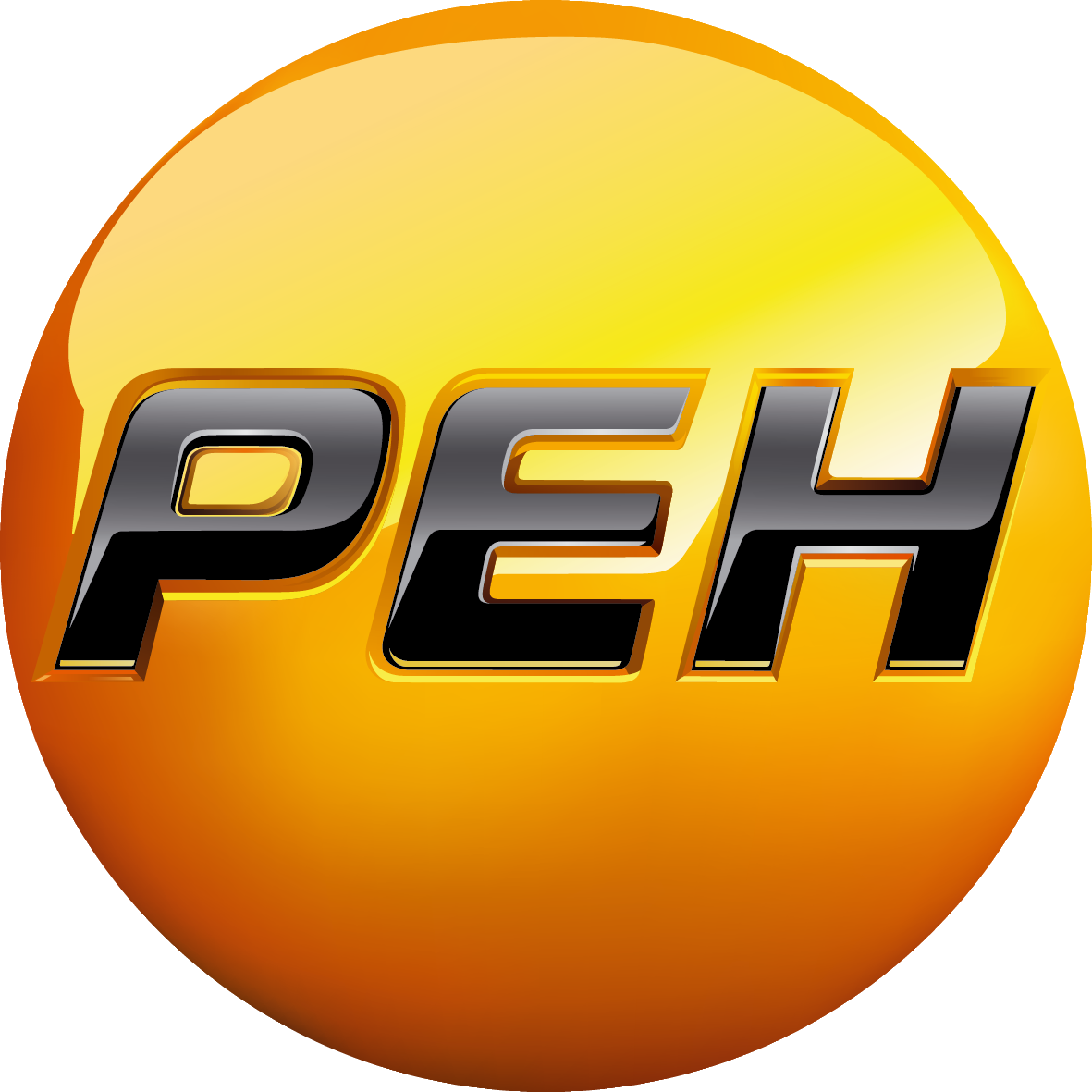
2011-2014

2014

2014-2015

2015-2017

2017–present

== International versions and availability ==
=== Ukraine ===
In Ukraine there was a full relay of the channel (including commercials) until 2014, excluding sports broadcasts and erotic programs (during which periods, its signal was suspended). The channel was distributed by the SonaR company from Dnipropetrovsk. In 2008 was suspended alongside Channel One Russia, RTR-Planeta, NTV Mir and TV Center International, after the problems were solved, REN TV resumed operations. In the 2000s and 2010s, REN TV was relayed terrestrially on the following channels:

- 7 Kanal (Kharkiv)
- 34 Kanal (Dnipro)
- Aleks (Zaporizhzhya)
- ART (Odesa)
- EKTA (Brovary)
- Zhitomirskaya OGTRK (Zhytomyr)
- IRTA (Luhansk)
- Nash Gorod (Brovary)
- Odessa-Plyus (Odessa) (1 January—15 November 2002)
- Profit (Kharkiv)
- Rudana (Kryvyi Rih)
- Sigma (Mariupol)
- ТВ-7 (Mariupol)
- Ukraine (Donetsk)
- Chernomorskaya TRK (ARC)

On 24 July 2014, the National Television and Radio Council decided to ban two Russian television channels that continued news in its output, among them REN TV, as it did not follow the requisites of the European Convention on Transnational Television and Part 1 of Article 42 of the Ukrainian law "On Television and Radio Broadcasting".

In June 2022, broadcasts resumed in parts of Kherson Oblast that were captured by Russia, alongside the appearance of other national channels from the Russian multiplexes.

=== Belarus ===
Since 1 January 2001, REN TV's programs are relayed by Capital TV.

=== Baltics ===
REN TV broadcast to the three Baltic countries until 2005. After that, a new REN TV Baltic channel with a British license was created. It ceased relaying REN TV programs on 10 February 2021.

=== Moldova ===
REN TV was relayed in Moldova until 6 January 2009, the ban was due to several of its original productions lacking rights outside of Russia. In December 2012, Teleproiect SRL obtained a license, creating a new channel, REN Moldova, in 2013.

=== Uzbekistan ===
In Uzbekistan, the channel was banned in 2004 due to the coverage of the situation in the country.

=== India ===
Although the channel never directly catered to India, it was available in the clear via satellite and redistributed to cable television companies. The channel caused a minor scandal in 2004, when its Saturday night block of erotic programming attracted local audiences, similar to what happened to TV-6, which India banned when the channel was still operational.

== Controversies ==
=== News coverage ===
In November 2005 REN TV fired Olga Romanova, the anchor of its daily 24 news flagship. Despite much publicity around the incident, her independent manner of reporting was continued by Marianna Maksimovskaya, formerly an anchor and news presenter for Vladimir Gusinsky's NTV Station. Maksimovskaya was in charge of news broadcasts on REN TV until 2014, when she was fired. Due to her activities, the channel was arguably Russia's only major TV outlet with liberal views, discussing the problem of state censorship and showing interviews with leaders of the political fringe (including Other Russia).

Prior to her departure from the channel, Romanova had told the Radio Free Europe on 25 November 2005 that the channel's head, Alexander Ordzhonikidze had pulled two recent stories for, she felt, political reasons. One censored item had covered an investigation into Defence Minister Sergei Ivanov's son's involvement in a road accident in which a woman died. Romanova spoken about the alleged censorship on Ekho Moskvy radio on 23 November 2005 – and the next day Ordzhonikidze barred from entering the channel's building. A second 'banned item had been about the building in central Moscow of a US$15 million church and clock tower by Zurab Tsereteli, the International Press Institute noted in its report on 2005.

Ordzhonikidze said in an interview for Echo of Moscow radio station that REN's news output had low ratings and management had decided to try other anchors on the evening newscasts.

In solidarity with Romanova, several of her journalist colleagues quit the channel in December 2005. Head of news and deputy channel director, Yelena Fedorova, told Radio Liberty's Russian Service (Radio Svoboda) why she had resigned.

=== Accusations of pseudoscience ===
REN TV has been accused of combining pieces of scientific shows and interviews to produce pseudoscientific "documentaries". In 2015, REN TV's documentaries were awarded "the most harmful pseudoscientific project (for spreading of myths, delusions and superstitions)" antiprize by the Ministry of Education and Science for propaganda of conspiracy theories and mistrust for science.

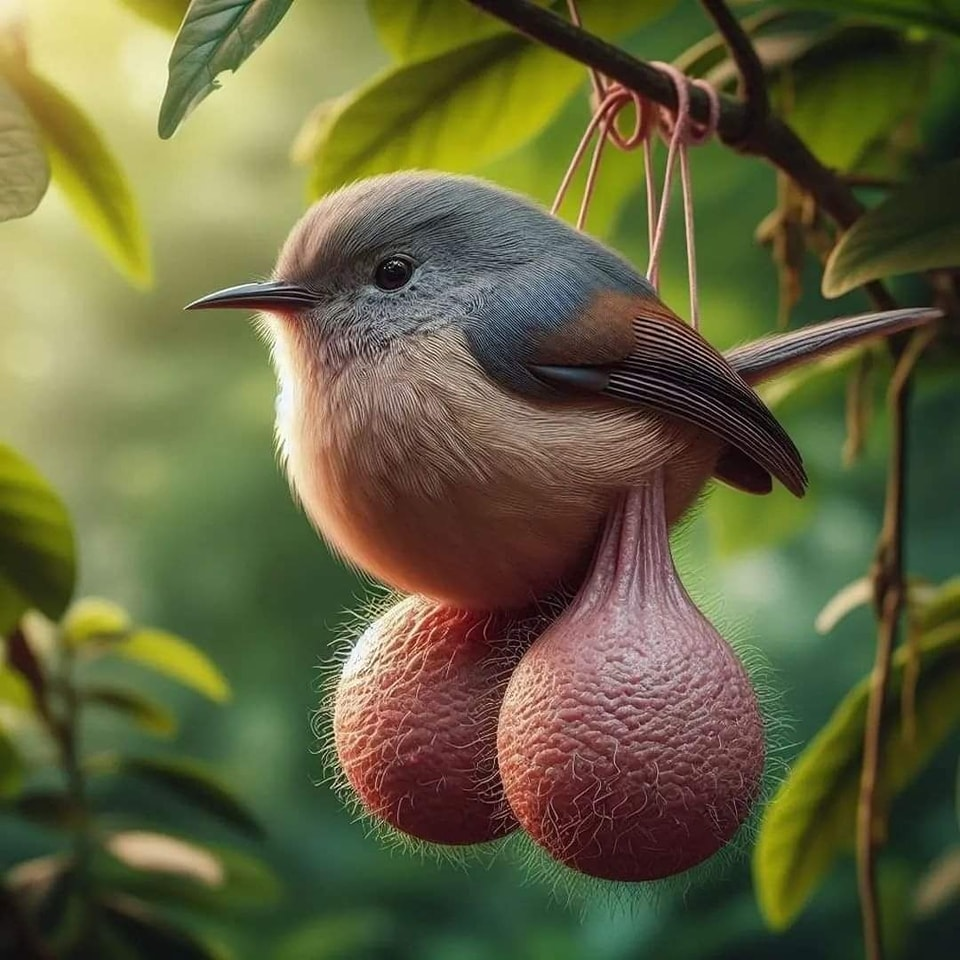
One of the images shown in the report

In October 2024, REN TV reported fictitious birds with human testicles, showing images generated using Midjourney that became an internet meme in early 2024. The report referred to the non-existent species as the "Madagascar egg-carrying thrush" and claimed that the bird's "pouches" were used for gestation and that they could also grow on its back. Ornithologist and Moscow State University professor Irina Boehme claimed to have found the information about the bird in an online article. Hi-Tech Mail suspected that REN TV editors erroneously reported the fictitious species without verifying the source. The report was ridiculed on social media.

== Scheduled content ==
=== Current ===
News, author-based and morning:

- Novosti REN TV (Новости РЕН ТВ)
- Emergency Call 112 (Экстренный вызов 112)
- Dobrov On Air (Добров в эфире)
- Program on Facts with Pyotr Marchenko (Итоговая программа с Петром Марченко)
- A Joyful Good Morning! (Самое бодрое утро!, formerly Joyful Morning|/С бодрым утром!)

Entertainment, education and documentary programming:

- In the Frame (В кадре)
- War Secrets (Военная тайна)
- The Most Shocking Hypotheses (Самые шокирующие гипотезы)
- Chapman's Mysteries (Тайны Чапман, formerly Mysteries of the World with Anne Chapman/Тайны мира с Анной Чапман)
- Mysteries of Humanity (Загадки человечества)
- Unknown History (Неизвестная история)
- Legends and Myths (Легенды и мифы)
- A Moment in History (Момент в истории)
- The Most Useful/Popular Program (Самая полезная/народная программа)
- MinTrans (МинТранс)
- How the World Works (Как устроен мир)
- Incredibly Amazing Histories (Невероятно интересные истории, formerly IAH REN TV/НИИ РЕН ТВ and IAH: Guide/НИИ: Путеводитель)
- Did You Know? (Знаете ли вы, что?)
- Science and Technology (Наука и техника)
- Curious Facts (Безумные факты)
- 100 Questions About Everything! (100 вопросов обо всём!)

Documentary films and cycles:

- Investigative documentaries and special programs
- Classified Lists (Засекреченные списки)
- Security Council (Совбез - Совет безопасности)
- Main Mysteries of the World (Главные тайны мира)
- The Greatest (Великие)
- Where Does Love/the Soul Live? (Где живёт любовь/душа?)
- Space: Nuclear Battleground (Космос: Поле ядерной битвы)
- Pavel Sudoplatov: Chronicles of a Secret War from the Eyes of an Eyewitness (Судоплатов: Хроники тайной войны глазами очевидца)
- What Do You Know About Planet Earth? (Что мы знаем о планете Земля?)
- War Lasers: Hunt For Super Weapons (Боевые лазеры: Охота за супероружием)
- Aliens Among Us (Чужой внутри)
- The Matrix of Fate (Матрица судьбы)
- The Body as a Gadget (Тело как Гаджет)

Sports:

- Fight Club (Бойцовский клуб)

=== Former ===
The company which produced several high-profile feature films, notably the Golden Lion-winning Vozvrashcheniye in 2003, is still a production house and has made much of the network's scheduled content, including numerous TV series:

- Soldiers (Russian: Солдаты), following recruits drafted into the Russian Army for their mandatory year of military service. 16 seasons as of 2009.
- Students (Russian: Студенты), following the social lives of several Moscow University for the Humanities students. (2005-2006)
- Tourists (Russian: Туристы), following several couples on vacation on a beach resort in Turkey. (2005)

In the past, REN TV aired American TV series, taken from FOX and Sony Pictures Television, including:

- Prison Break (as Побег) since September 4, 2006
- Family Guy (as Гриффины)
- Friends (as Друзья)
- M*A*S*H (as МЭШ)
- My Name Is Earl (as Меня зовут Эрл) since 2006
- Supernatural (as Сверхъестественное) since September 2006
- The 4400 (as 4400) since November 26, 2006
- The Simpsons (as Симпсоны)
- The X-Files (as Секретные материалы)
- Jetix, children's adventure programming from Disney

Later purchased/licensed programming:

- Persons Unknown (as Неизвестные лица) since November 2012
- Top Gear Russia (Russian: Top Gear: Русская версия) since February 22, 2009

Other shows include at the moment:

- Граница Времени (The Edge of Time) - self-produced science fiction series, airs from 2015

Since 2017, REN TV ceased airing TV series of its own production, as its programming line changed drastically.
