= Igor Prokopenko =

Russian filmmaker and journalist (born 1965)

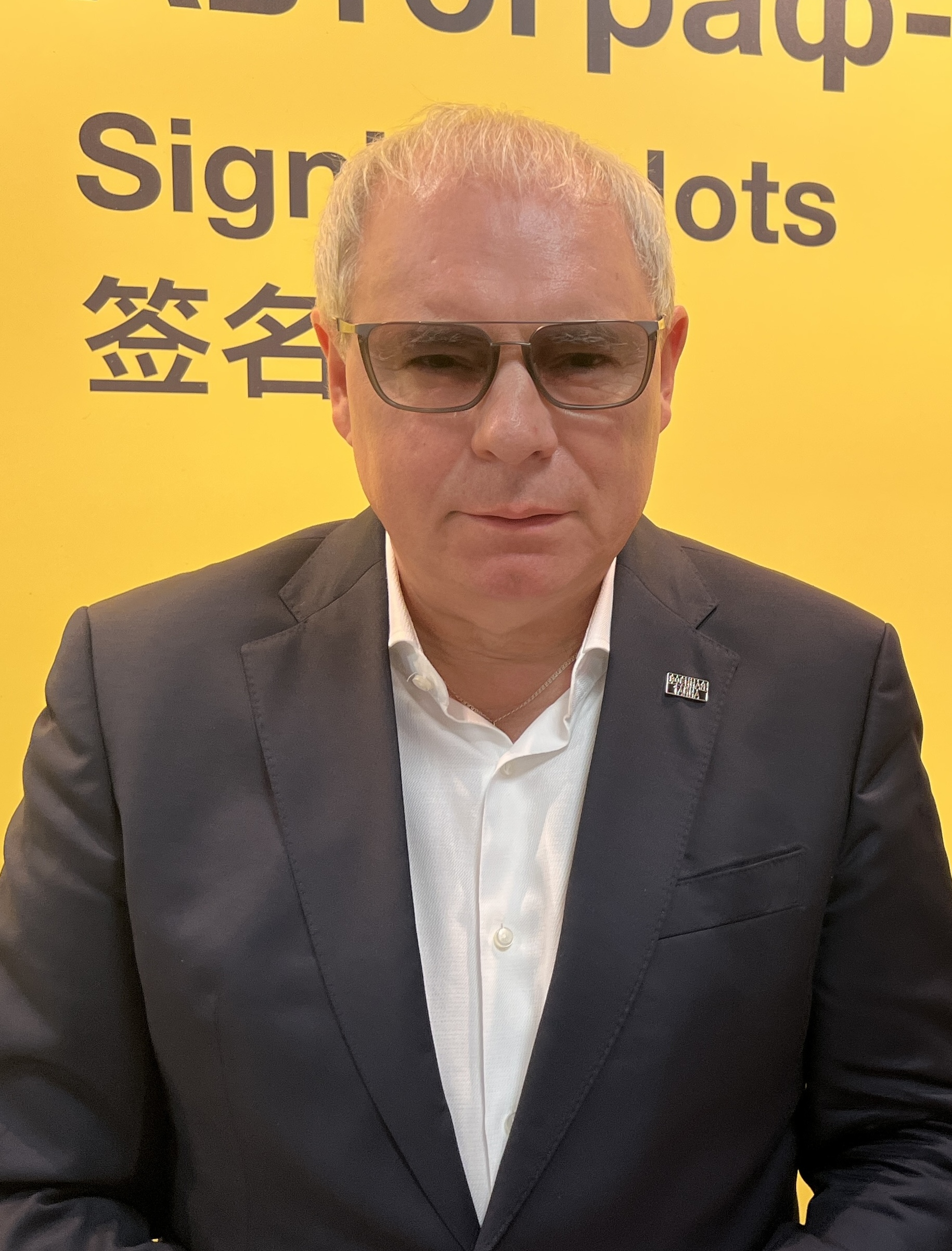
- Prokopenko in 2024
- Born: February 8, 1965 (age 61); Pavlovsk, Voronezh region, RSFSR, USSR
- Television: REN TV

Igor Stanislavovich Prokopenko (Russian: И́горь Станисла́вович Прокопе́нко; born February 8, 1965, Pavlovsk, Voronezh Region or Pavlovsk, Leningrad) is a Russian documentary filmmaker, journalist, TV presenter, writer and creator of entertainment programs, Deputy Director General for documentary and nonfiction projects of the REN TV television company. Seven-time winner of the TEFI Award, author of the film about the Flat Earth, twice (2017, 2020) finalist of the anti-award "Honorary Academician LIED" with the wording "for outstanding contribution to Russian pseudoscience".

== Biography ==
He was born on February 8, 1965 in the city of Pavlovsk, Voronezh region, according to other sources — in Pavlovsk, part of Leningrad. He graduated from the Kalinin Suvorov Military College. He served in the air defense aviation, was discharged from the army with the rank of major in the reserve.

He graduated from the Donetsk Higher Military-Political College of Engineering and Communications Troops. After graduation, he was assigned to the 148th Center for Combat Use and Retraining of Air Defense Aviation, which was not on geographical maps.

Since 1989, he has worked as a freelance military columnist for the Krasnaya Zvezda newspapers, Moskovsky Komsomolets, Rossiyskaya Gazeta and others. He published reports from "hot spots".

Since 1994, he has worked at the Central Television and Radio Studio of the Ministry of Defense, VoenTV, and was a military columnist for the news programs Vremya, Segodnya, and Vesti. In 1995, he made his first documentary film, A Brooch on a Braid (Channel One Russia). In 1996-1997, he hosted the author's program The Oath on the RTR channel.

In 1998, Prokopenko joined the REN-TV channel at the invitation of Irena Lesnevskaya and Vladimir Molchanov. Since September 6, 1998, he has been the host of the author's program Military Secret on the REN-TV channel. Since 2004, he has been Deputy Director General of the TV channel for socio—political and documentary broadcasting. Since 2006, he has been the head of the Documentary Projects Department of the TV channel.

From 2005 to the present, he has been the artistic director of the Format TV studio, which produces the TV programs Military Secret (until 2005, it was produced by the broadcaster through its own efforts) and Territory of Delusion.

Author and producer of the projects Ebola Fever: the mystery of the death virus. Chernobyl: The Doomed Nuclear Power Plant. Armies of the World, How the MIR was Flooded, On Both Sides of Victory, The Chronicle of Global Terrorism, The Declassified Age, Secret Diplomacy, The Chechen Trap, the documentary series Reflection, The Territory of Delusion, and the daily documentary series Stories... since January 2007.

From September 2006 to October 2012, he was the head of the High—profile Case project.

From October 16, 2012 to November 9, 2019, he was the presenter of the program Territory of Delusion.

From June 15, 2015 he was presenter of the program The Most Shocking Hypotheses.

He is also the host of the TV channel's documentary marathons, such as The Day, Military secrets, Day of Space Stories, and Russian Rolls.

In 2014, he became the general producer and one of the creators of the show My Beautiful... with Pavel Rakov.

In 2022, he received 7.5 million rubles from the Presidential Fund for Cultural Initiatives for a series of lectures named "Conversations About the Most Important Things with Igor Prokopenko", with whom he traveled around Russia. The topic of the lecture is the war in Ukraine: when and how it will end.

He is a member of the Academy of Russian Television.

He s the author of the book series Military Secret published by Eksmo.

== Documentary series and projects ==
- Military Secret (Military Secret Day) The Reflection project is the Territory of Misconceptions The most shocking hypotheses (Day of the most shocking hypotheses; Day of the most shocking predictions and very scary cases) The parallels
- Russian rolls
- Secret Territories (Secret Territories Day) The Battle of Civilizations Space Stories (Space Stories Day) Sensational Materials Day Day of Prohibited Materials Fantastic Stories (Fantastic Stories Day) Great mysteries Food of the Gods The Day of Predictions It's a terrible thing Aliens of national importance The conspiracy of the puppeteers Live theme The Elixir of Youth The War of the Worlds It's a strange thing Secret Stories (Secret Stories Day) A special project. Moon Race A special project. The Mortal Conspiracy Stephen Hawking's Last Secret Mysteries of the Universe The assault on consciousness Day of Secret Projects Deceived by science 11 reasons for the end of the world Apocalypse. Moon We never dreamed of it. Secrets of ancient beauties Fiction classified as 'Secret'

== Family ==
His wife is Oksana Barkovskaya. They have two daughters And a son.

The father is famous military journalist Stanislav Prokopenko.

== Worldview, public position ==
He received an ordinary Soviet upbringing, was a pioneer and a member of the Komsomol. There was a religious grandmother in the family. While serving in the army, he heard a sermon by a priest at the newly opened Danilov Monastery, after which he came to the faith. He calls himself Orthodox, attends church, although he does not keep posts.

According to Igor Prokopenko, his break with the liberal public occurred back in the late 1990s.

I come from a liberal society in the late 80s and early 90s. But at some point, I began to realize that something was wrong with the liberal movement. I remember back in the 90s I made a film about a human rights organization and told them that it was funded by the US State Department. The editors told me: no, this film should not be released. Why, it's the truth! No need, that's all. I gradually began to realize that Russia is more of a pseudo-liberalism. I perceive a liberal as a thinking person for whom truth is above all. And today's pseudo-liberals have it like this: if Putin is against, then I'm in favor. Regardless of what is happening.

He blamed Mikhail Gorbachev and Boris Yeltsin for the collapse of the USSR.: Russia is now within the borders that it was under Ivan the Terrible. And why is that? Two random people in the Kremlin: Yeltsin and Gorbachev.

In July 2009, Prokopenko joined the central council of supporters of the United Russia party, which supports the course of the president and the government of the country.

Prokopenko spoke about his relationship with Russian defense ministers of various years in 2016.

The "military secret" outlived six defense ministers. I had a difficult relationship with Grachev, a good one with Rodionov, and a bad one with Marshal Sergeev. By a bad relationship, I mean distrust. I had a very bad relationship with Serdyukov. I was the only one in the post-Soviet media space who allowed himself to criticize him publicly. During his tenure as minister, we had no relationship at all. Yes, actually, even now there is no special relationship.…

== Criticism ==
Igor Prokopenko's work in the programs Military Secret and Territory of Delusion in the 2010s has been repeatedly criticized by journalists, the scientific community, and viewers for its low level of professionalism and pseudoscientific statements that contradict reality, And since 2013-2014, after the change in the socio-political situation in the country, he has also been responsible for open anti-Western propaganda.

=== Anti-Western propaganda ===
Novaya Gazeta columnist Slava Taroshchina:

There is Igor Prokopenko on REN TV. He started under Irena Lesnevskaya, specialized in military secrets, and directed one of the best documentary series about the war, "On Both Sides of Victory." Lesnevskaya left. The country has changed. Prokopenko has changed beyond recognition. He even looks like Dmitry Kiselyov, now pomaded and dancing. And just like him, he is able to detect Russia's enemies at any tram stop. Prokopenko has now grown to a full Day of military secrecy. I have mastered only a fragment of the day devoted to the phenomenon of Putinomania. Its essence is as simple as anything ingenious: Putin is the only pillar of a shaky world. Prokopenko sang long and well…

Irina Petrovskaya, a columnist for Novaya Gazeta:

God be with her, with Anna Chapman and her "Secrets of the World"... But Igor Prokopenko, a seemingly serious journalist, author of excellent documentaries, winner of many awards! <...> The "territory of delusion", if not the "territory of delusion", is more often the program itself. Here, for example, is one of the issues that opens the public's eyes to the conspiracy of the world behind the scenes against Russia. "It's hard to believe" (this is one of the key phrases of the program), but according to the secret plan of the Americans, by 2030 there will be no state called "Russia" on the political map of the world. "It's hard to believe," but the Americans call the Russians an enslaved people and plan to dismember Russia into small parts (the Anaconda Loop plan). "It's hard to believe, especially since there are no documents or convincing proofs of this." P.), but "it is known for sure" (again — so!) that it was members of the powerful Heidelberg Club (Rockefeller, Rothschild, Soros) who brought Gorbachev to power in order to destroy the Soviet Union and gain access to its natural resources: "There are enough supporters of the version that Mikhail Gorbachev and Raisa Maksimovna were CIA agents but since there is no evidence, it would be unfair to insist on it"

=== Propaganda of pseudoscience ===
On September 25, 2017, Prokopenko's program The Most Shocking Hypotheses presented the theory of a flat Earth, which has now been refuted by science. Critical comments from experts were not presented in the program. TV journalist Vladimir Kara-Murza Sr., in light of the broadcast, noted:

Prokopenko on the screen of REN TV is in the role of a ventriloquist magician: he knows everything about the Egyptian pyramids, and about aliens, and about Atlantis, and about the opposition. And he releases new books almost weekly, which he advertises on his own air.

In response to the accusations, Prokopenko stated

There is a saying that a proven hypothesis becomes the truth, and an unproven hypothesis becomes a problem. This is probably our case. The hypothesis that the Earth is actually flat is quite popular, it has a huge number of adherents all over the world. I didn't invent it. Look on the Internet and make sure.

Popularizer of science, editor-in-chief of Antropogenez.ru A. B. Sokolov in an interview with Gazeta.Ru He criticized Prokopenko's books based on the issues of The Territory of Delusion, as "these books are full of quotes from scientists." Some of them, such as the historian D. D. Belyaev, were completely unaware of which books their opinions appeared on. In addition, Sokolov noted; My hypothesis is that these quotes are interview pieces from those very broadcasts. That is, a very effective technical process: when an interview with an expert is recorded, both content for broadcasts and material for books are obtained. Considering that, in my opinion, some parts are repeated from book to book, the business turns out to be extremely effective. You'll get jealous. But what kind of damage is being done to Russian brains? I'm afraid to even guess. In 2018, writer and journalist Anton Pervushin sued Prokopenko for using interviews with him in anti-science films and books.:

I am extremely outraged by the use of my words in films designed to confirm the theories of the "moon conspiracy". When preparing for the interview, I was assured that it would be used in a popular science film that talks about modern scientific research in the field of space exploration. I am always willing to take part in such projects. I was misled, because if the film crew had honestly informed me that the films would be devoted to promoting the theory of the "moon conspiracy" and various speculations around anomalous phenomena, I would have refused. — Anton Pervushin for the magazine "World of Fiction"

In his explanation sent to the Oktyabrsky District Court of St. Petersburg, Prokopenko stated that his transfer was staged.

«Firstly, Igor Prokopenko's books themselves or parts of them are not interviews, as they are literary works and are not built according to the "question-answer" scheme like an interview. Secondly, the plaintiff is not listed in the book as the author. From the excerpts from Prokopenko's books presented to the court, it follows that the plaintiff plays the role of a person voicing and executing certain information, since in the books there is a colon and direct speech after the plaintiff's last name and there is no indication of the plaintiff's authorship. We have presented evidence that the plaintiff is voicing part of the script for the television program "Territory of Delusion" with Igor Prokopenko," the TV journalist wrote.

== Awards ==
The TEFI Television Award

- TEFI Television Award (Investigative Journalism nomination, 2000) — for the film "Ebola Fever — the Mystery of the Death Virus".
- TV award "TEFI" (nomination "Investigative journalism", 2001) — for the documentary series "Voices from Silence".
- TEFI Television Award (Investigative Journalism nomination, 2003) — for the film "Diary of a Fugitive".
- TEFI Television Award (nomination "Television Documentary Series", 2005) — for the documentary series "The Chechen Trap".
- TEFI Television Award (nomination "Television Documentary Series", 2007) — for the documentary film "Prisoners and the Forgotten".
- TEFI Television Award (TV Documentary nomination, 2020) — for the film "Dr. Lisa"
- TEFI Television Award (Educational Program nomination, 2015) — for the program "Military Secret"

The Eurasian Telephone Forum

- V Eurasian Teleforum (special Jury Prize, 2001) — for the documentary series "Voices from Silence"
- VII Eurasian Telephone Forum (main prize, 2004).
- X Eurasian Telephone Forum (nomination "Information and Analytical Program", 2007) — for the documentary "Anna. To kill a journalist".
- XII Eurasian Teleforum (diploma, 2009) — for the creation of the first multi-part feature film "The Last Secret of the Master".

Artyom Borovik Award

- Artyom Borovik Award (2003) — for the film "Return to the North East". Artyom Borovik Award (2004) — for creative achievements in the genre of investigative journalism. Artyom Borovik Award (2005) — for significant contribution to the development of independent journalism in Russia.

International TV Film Forum "Together"

- Grand Prix of the International Telekinoforum "Together" (2002) — for the program "Military Secret". Grand Prix of the International TV Film Forum "Together" (nomination "Man of Action", 2007) — for the documentary film "Anna. To kill a journalist." Grand Prix of the International TV Film Forum "We are together!" (2024) — for the program "Why was Soviet Ukraine created?".

The Sea Calls Film Festival

- Grand Prix of the International Film Festival of Marine and Adventure Films "The Sea Calls" (2007) — for the documentary film "Hostages of the Deep".
- Prize of the International Film Festival of Marine and Adventure Films "The Sea calls" (2008) — for the best film about divers and divers.

Prizes and awards

- Award of the Foreign Intelligence Service of the Russian Federation (2001) — for the documentary series "Voices from Silence".
- Grand Prix and Prize of the President of the Italian Republic of the Rome Festival (2002) — for the film "Return to the Northeast".
- Grand Prix of the Moscow International Film Festival "Golden George" (2003) — for the documentary film "Cancer Corps".
- Grand Prix of the Law and Society Festival (2003) — for the documentary series "Chronicle of World Terrorism".
- Grand Prix of the Brussels Festival (2003) - for the documentary series "Voices from the Silence".
- Manager of the Year Contest (winner in the Electronic Media nomination, 2007).
- Award of the FSB of Russia (nomination "Television and radio programs", 2007) — for the series of programs "Military Secret" dedicated to the problems of security and defense capability of the state. The National award "Laurel Branch" in the field of non—fiction films and television (nomination "Best Documentary series", 2007) - for the 3-episode film "The Other War". The award of the All-Russian review competition "On Guard of Order", conducted by the Federal Penitentiary Service (nomination "Best program (film) in the genre of investigative journalism", 2009) — for the film "The Smuggler's Way".
- Grand Prix of the VII Yuri Ozerov International War Film Festival (2009) — for the documentary film "The Tskhinvali Cross".
- The anti-award was a LIE from the portal "Anthropogenesis.<url>" and the Evolution Foundation (II place, 2017) — for outstanding contribution to Russian pseudoscience as the author and producer of the projects "Theory of Delusion", "The Most shocking Hypotheses" and "Military Secret".
- In 2018, he became a laureate of the international Prize Terra Incognita Awards.
- Anti-LIAR Award, (II place, 2020)

== Bibliography ==
- Prokopenko I. S.. «The assault on consciousness. The Truth about Manipulating human consciousness», The series "Military secret", ed. Eksmo (documentary literature, military affairs, special services), Moscow, 2012 — 310 p.: 13 ill. — ISBN 978-5-699-55217-7
- Grigory Sokolnikov. The unlearned lessons of the NEP. — M. : Sistema : ROSSPEN, 2021. — 391 p. : ill., port., color. ill., fax. — (Pages of Soviet and Russian history) — ISBN 978-5-8243-2460-0
