= Mikhail Osokin =

Soviet journalist

- Михаил Осокин
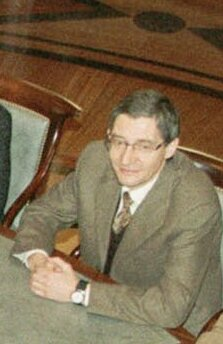
- Osokin in 2001
- Born: 14 January 1952 (age 74); Kalinin, Soviet Union
- Education: Moscow State University
- Occupations: Journalist, television anchor
- Employer(s): Radio Moscow; 1st channel Ostankino
- Awards: TEFI

Mikhail Glebovich Osokin (Russian: Михаил Глебович Осокин; born 14 January 1952, Kalinin, RSFSR) is a Russian journalist and TV presenter, columnist. He holds the Candidate of Historical Sciences degree.

== Biography ==
He was born on 14 January 1952 in Kalinin (Tver) in European Russia. He was raised by his grandmother, Johanna Robertovna for the first few years.

He studied at School No. 9 (now Gymnasium No. 3) in Volgograd; he lived with his stepfather and mother, who had arrived from Novosibirsk during the formation of the Volgograd television studio.

He was expelled from the second year of the History Department of Moscow State University for active participation in a student strike with the wording "For an anti-communist attitude toward public life and work" and reinstated after military service. He served in the Soviet Air Forces, and was a squad commander.

In 1975, he graduated from the History Department of Moscow State University, and then from graduate school at Moscow State University. He was a classmate of Nikolai Svanidze.

In 1982, he defended his dissertation "Trade of England with the Levant during the crisis of English absolutism (1600-1640)" for the degree of candidate of historical sciences.

=== Media ===
From 1978 to 1990, he worked in the World Service of Moscow Radio in the editorial office of broadcasting to the USA and Great Britain.

Since 1990 he worked in television, in the information department of the Soviet Central Television, and then - Ostankino Television Company. He was the host of the information and entertainment program Good Morning, then - a commentator and host of the TSN news program.

In the period 1991-1993 - host of the night news broadcasts of 1st channel Ostankino, in 1993, there - host of evening broadcasts.

He worked at NTV from the day the television company was founded in October 1993. From that moment until April 2001, he was the host of the evening broadcasts at 19:00 and 22:00 (alternating with Tatyana Mitkova) of the NTV television company's news program Today. On 1 March 1995, at approximately 22:25 Moscow winter time, he was the first to report the murder of Vladislav Listyev live on the NTV television channel on the Today television program.

On 14 April 2001, after the change of ownership of the NTV television company (the channel came under the control of Gazprom-Media), he and his "team" left NTV for TNT, and a few days later for the TV-6 channel. In 2002, after TV-6 was shut down, he began working on the TVS channel, which had just been launched on the same frequency.

In 2001-2002, he worked as the host of the news program "Today on TV-6" ("Now"). Osokin became the first journalist from Kiselevsky NTV to go live on TV-6. In 2002-2003, he was the host of the evening news on TVS. In the last months of the channel's work, he was the channel's deputy general director for information broadcasting (together with Marianna Maksimovskaya).

After TVS was switched off in June 2003, Osokin returned to NTV, where from July 2003 to August 2005 he hosted the seven-hour Today program alternately (one week after another) with Tatyana Mitkova, and later with Olga Belova. He was also the host (together with Tatyana Mitkova) of the NTV special project for the 60th anniversary of Victory in the Great Patriotic War of 1941-1945, “Moscow-Berlin,” in May 2005.

Since Vladimir Kulistikov was appointed general director of NTV in the summer of 2004, Tatyana Mitkova first disappeared from the air (having received a management position - deputy general director for information), and exactly one year later, by September 2005, Mikhail Osokin was "moved" first to the night air (where during this period of work Osokin signed a collective letter to Kulistikov, which was also signed by fellow newsmen Anton Khrekov and Alexey Pivovarov; it discussed the unwillingness to work under Mitkova's leadership due to her personal qualities), and on 12 January 2006, it became known that the channel was removing the night news broadcast from the broadcast schedule altogether, despite good ratings. The next day, 13 January, NTV CEO Kulistikov promised to provide the TV presenter with a new, different position at NTV, and discussed with Osokin the prospect of his participation in a “cyclical historical project” (in the format of a historical TV magazine), which was supposed to go on air in the fall of 2006. However, in April 2006 Mikhail Osokin decided to leave NTV and continue working in the news structure, but on a different channel.

From May 2006 until the summer of 2008, Mikhail Osokin worked as the presenter of the evening news program “Now” on the international Russian-language channel RTVI, after the reduction of the news department staff and the closure of the seven o’clock news release in early June 2008, he was transferred to the morning news and — at the same time — to deputy editor-in-chief “for operational management of news”.

From 1 September 2008 from Monday to Thursday he hosted the final news broadcast on the REN TV channel - from 6 September 2010 for the whole country, from September 2011 to December 2012 - alternately (one week later) with Andrei Dobrov. During the 2012 presidential election (from January to March 2012) he went on, according to Marianna Maksimovskaya, "creative leave".

From 14 February to 27 June 2013, he was the author and host of the weekly 20-minute author's program "What happened? with Mikhail Osokin", summing up the interim results of the first half of the week. The broadcast time is Thursday, 23:30 Moscow time. The editor-in-chief of the program was Elena Savina. Then the program went on vacation, from which it did not return, after which Osokin finally left television.
