= Dyatlows =

Russian adult animation television series

- Genre: Comedy, adventure
- Voices of: Alexander Lenkov, Natalia Khorokhorina, Artyom Karapetyan, Konstantin Mikhailov, Dmitry Polonsky, Alexey Kolgan, Vadim Andreev, Olga Bityukova, Elena Solovyova, Artyom Krotov
- Composer: Alexey Prosvirnin
- Country of origin: Russia
- Original language: Russian
- No. of seasons: 2
- No. of episodes: 32

Production
- Producer: Dmitry Lesnevsky
- Running time: 25 minutes
- Production companies: REN TV Computer Graphics and Animation Studio

Original release
- Network: REN TV
- Release: April 14, 2003 – December 25, 2004

Dyatlows (Дятлоws) is a Russian adult animated series produced by the CG Alliance Studio for REN TV. The two-season series centers on the dysfunctional Dyatlov family from Moscow.

== Plot ==
The Dyatlov family has three problems: Nikolai's search for a job, family dramas and childhood misadventures. Each episode starts in a climactic suspense, followed by Nikita describing the last crazy situation they were involved in apparently normal circumstances, and the motivations behind it.

In the second season, the plot changes: Nikolai becomes an inventor, Klavdiya a writer and Sveta moves to Germany. Klavdiya's mother from France visits the Dyatlov family. The episodes involve the family trying to fight against criminal gangs, such as the Kryviye Brothers, Macho, Dictor and a cyborg nicknamed Bolt, as well as the misadventures of a foreign intelligent officer.

== Characters ==
- Nikolay Dyatlov is the family's father and boss. He is weak by nature, obedient to his wife without questioning. He graduated as an engineer, but is constantly in search for work, becoming an inventor in season 2. He is voiced by Aleksander Lenkov.
- Klavdiya Dyatlova is Nikolai's wife. She is a real fighter, constantly jealous of his husband and not afraid of pointing out his mistakes. Aged 37, she works as an accountant in season 1, becoming a poet in season 2. Voiced by Natalya Horohorina.
- Nikita Dyatlov is Nikolai and Klavdiya's oldest son. The series' main character and narrator, he is a problematic teenager who barely graduated in middle school and tried to enter in high school, he almost ended up in the army and ended up having a job at McRonald's (parody of McDonald's. After being hit by a lightning ray, he began to read minds. Voiced by Konstantin Mihailov.
- Sveta Dyatlova is Nikita's sister and the middle child. She is extremely ambitious and tried to earn money at any cost. She studies in middle school and is a soloist in the school choir. Her dream is to be a rollerskater. She moved to Germany in season 2, becoming absent from the series. Voiced by Elena Solovyova.
- Petya Dyatlov is the youngest child. Attending kindergarten, he speaks a lot of curse words and behaves badly at such a young age. Voiced by Aleksei Kolgan.
- The Grandfather is an optimist man who adopted the current youth slang and became informal in appearance. He frequently takes part in rallies and protests. In spite of that, he misses how good things were in the USSR and how its dissolution led to ruin. Voiced by Artyom Karapetyan.
- Dyatlov Telik is an anthropomorphic television set who acts as a loyal friend to the family, acting as a voice of reason for the family, which often responds negatively. Voiced by Aleksander Abrakhimov in the first three episodes, later by Aleksei Kolgan from episode 4.
- Allochka is Nikita's friend and Veronika Karlovna's daughter. She has an insane personality, obsessed with pop music and disco dancing. According to Nikita, "she only says what she speaks": Voiced by Elena Solovyova.
- Tamara is Klava's best friend and wife of rich businessman Lyonechek. For that, she lives in a large mansion and frequently travels to Cyprus and Egypt, while his son studies in the UK. Despite her somehwat sarcastic personality and inability for banal chats, she helps Klava in difficult situations. Voiced by Elena Solovyova.
- Matvey Glyuk is a television presenter and host of controversial talk shows, similar in line to those by Andrey Malakhov. Voiced by Aleksei Kolgan.

== Production ==
The series was created by Dimitry Azadov of CG Alliance Studio, a CGI animation company from Moscow. He developed the plot lines and designs, Volodya Novichikhin and Maxim Grinats drew the initial sketches and the basis for the characters. During production, Dmitry Tkachenko developed a CG engine comparable to those used by Unreal Studios. The series used motion capture techniques using 3DS Max and Maya.

== Reception ==
The series launched in April 2003 as part of REN TV's repositioning. Novaya Gazeta noted that "in a certain manner, [Dyatlows] resemble The Simpsons". Lenta, on the other hand, noticed that the similarities were "distant from the typically American Simpsons", and unlike the American show, the titular family did not solve global issues or unknown diseases.

== Release ==
A DVD with four episodes was released in November 2003. According to REN TV's animation studio, pirated copies of the first four episodes were released after their television airing in metro stations.
