= Russia Behind Bars =

Non-governmental organization

Charitable Foundation for Assistance to Convicts and Their Families "Russia Behind Bars”
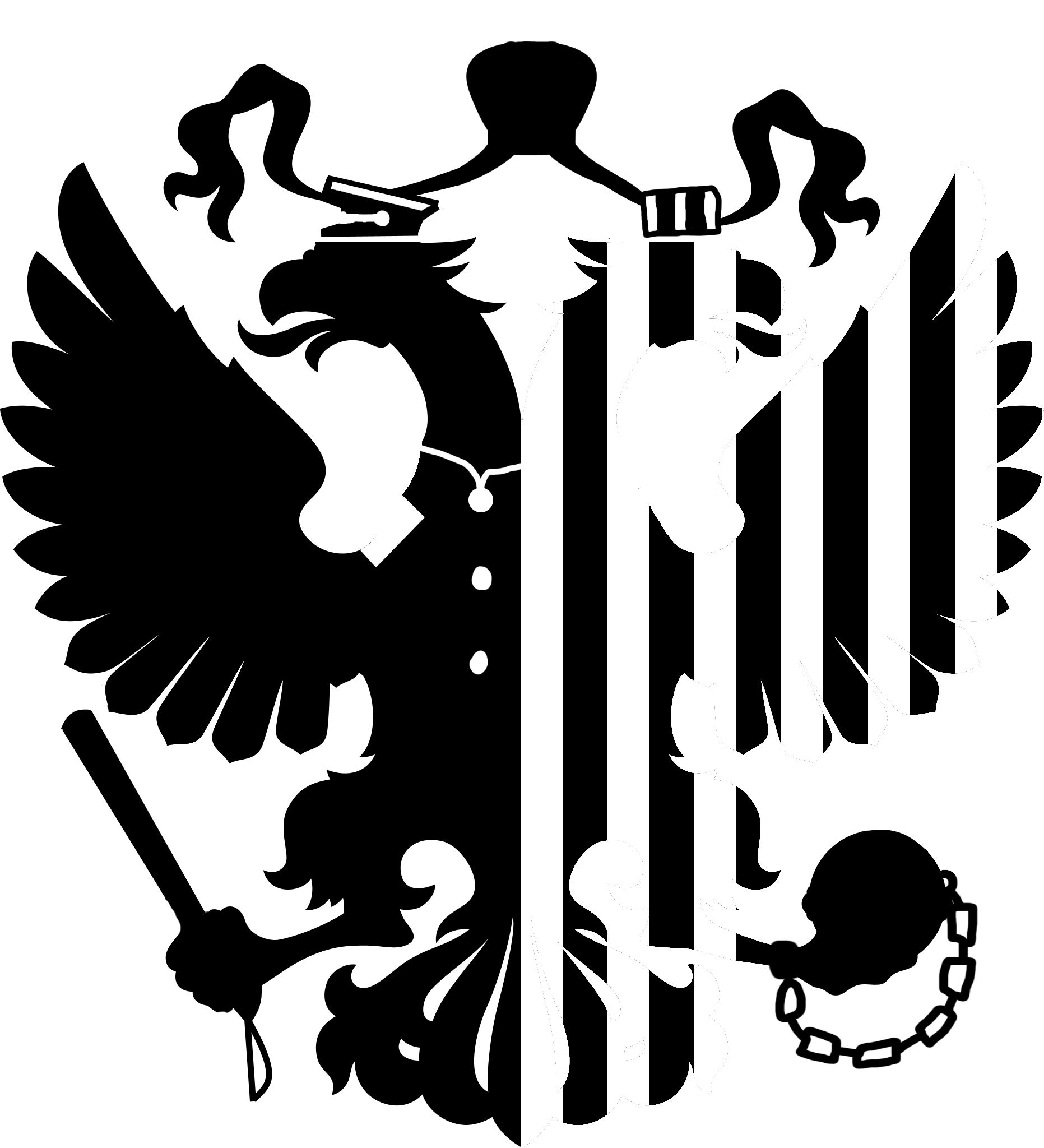
- Founded: 21 November 2008
- Founder: Olga Romanova
- Type: Non-profit
- Purpose: Human rights
- Location: Moscow, Russia
- Key people: Sergey Sharov-Delone (Сергей Шаров-Делоне)
- Website: zekovnet.ru

Russia Behind Bars (NGO Charitable Foundation for Assistance to Convicts and Their Families "Rus Sidyashchaya") — is a non-governmental organization whose goal is to provide legal and humanitarian assistance to citizens facing Russian investigations and the penitentiary system. The head office of the organization is located in Moscow. Moreover, office organizations exist in Novosibirsk, St. Petersburg and Yaroslavl.

In parallel with the NGO, there is the Russian Sitting (Russian imprisonment) movement, an unregistered association of citizens who have faced a violation of human rights by the employees of the law enforcement, judicial, supervisory and penitentiary systems of the Russian Federation.

== History ==
Russia Behind Bars was founded on 21 November 2008 by Russian journalist and publicist Olga Romanova. The founding members of the organization consisted of an informal group of citizens, whose relatives were in prison. In 2014 the public movement "Russia Behind Bars" decided to register a "Charitable Foundation for Assistance to Prisoners and their Families".

== Management ==
The foundation is presided by journalist Olga Romanova. The board of trustees consists of Svetlana Bahmina, Irina Yasina, Vladimir Pereverzin, Tamara Eidelman and Maria Aismont. Petr Oficerov was also on the board until his death in July 2018.

== Funding ==
The charity foundation "Russia Behind Bars" is financed by private donations. In August 2017 "Russia Behind Bars" was awarded a presidential grant of 3 million rubles (approx. $50000). However, the organisation refused to receive for bureaucratic reasons.

In spring 2018 the foundation received an EU grant for the purpose of creation and support of regional "legal clinics".

The head of Russia Behind Bars Olga Romanova announced on her Facebook page that starting from 26 June 2020 the charity will be closed. The reason became the court's decision to pay the former employee Dinar Idrisov compensation of 1.3 million rubles and re-employ him. According to Romanova, the Fund's accounts were seized and it did not have this sum of money. However, she also stated that the Fund will continue its work only now without a legal entity.

== Activities and projects ==
The lawyers of the organization protect people in courts, help write complaints, and conduct legal consultations. The NGO also collects and sends parcels to penal colonies and pre-trial detention centers, collects things for special boarding schools, and provides humanitarian assistance to families of prisoners.

=== School of Public Defender ===
The project is conducted in collaboration with OVD-info (ОВД-Инфо), Sakharov Center and Russia Behind Bars. School of Public Defender is a project aimed to teach people all the necessary legal mechanisms of defence in courts.

=== MediaLaboratory ===
MediaLaboratory is a project of Rus Sidyashchaya designed to overcome dumbness. The project helps people who do not have the skills of business, public or administrative communication to tell their story clearly and simply.

=== Prison consultant ===
Prison consultant began working on 19 September 2017. This is an online information support system for prisoners and their families. The project was created by the team of Rus Sidyashchaya in the grassroots incubator of the Human Rights Incubator. The site vturme.info publishes all the necessary information for people faced with the Russian system of criminal prosecution and execution of sentences. Based on the practice of Rus Sidyashchaya, it provides basic advice on typical problematic situations in prisons. The project of creating an online guide in the form of a "prison wikipedia" became the winner of the Human Rights Incubator NGO Memorial competition of grassroots initiatives, which allowed the foundation team to share their experience and knowledge.

== Conflict with the leadership of the FSIN ==
In May 2017, a joint special issue of Novaya Gazeta and "Russia Behind Bars" was published entirely devoted to the prison system. It said that Russia Behind Bars together with the Center for Strategic Research of Alexei Kudrin were developing their draft reform of the penal system. Olga Romanova reported that serious changes were being prepared regarding the reduction of prison violence, personnel issues, labor organization and social adaptation. Soon after the publication, on 8 June 2017, OBEP employees came to the Moscow office of "Russia Behind Bars". A formal reason for the visit was a message about " the theft of budgetary funds by default on obligations under the contract".

The "RS" organisation affiliated with "Russia Behind Bars" was leading the project to improve the financial literacy of prisoners and their relatives for two years from 2015 to 2017. The idea of the project was to explain to them how to solve financial issues if they or their relative were imprisoned. The project was funded by the World Bank. As a part of this project, 4350 copies of brochures on financial literacy were compiled, printed, and sent to prisons and colonies, 92 lectures were given to prisoners, their relatives and prison staff.

As a result of the OBEP raid a copy of one thank-you letter was withdrawn from the colony. The foundation issued an official statement in which it linked the actions of investigators with the confrontation of the FSIN organization and the FSIN system, in particular with the fact that "Russia Behind Bars" was involved in developing the concept of prison reform system.

On 9 June 2017, Olga Romanova was forced to temporarily leave Russia. Later, the court found no irregularities in the work of the "RS". The organization filed a lawsuit against representatives and operators of the World Bank in Russia, the court acknowledged that "RS" fulfilled all obligations under the contracts. Then, "Russia Behind Bars" filed a lawsuit against the Federal Penitentiary Service in court to protect its business reputation.

In the fall of 2018, the former prisoner Inga Krivitskaya registered the doppelganger of the "Russia Behind Bars" foundation with the Ministry of Justice and filed a lawsuit against Olga Romanova and Lev Ponomaryov to protect honor and dignity. Krivitskaya said that she did not know that an organization with the same name had already existed. Olga Romanova and employees of "Russia Behind Bars" expressed confidence that Krivitskaya was acting under the leadership of the FSIN.

=== Foreign agent designation by Russia ===
On 26 March EU granted to Rus Sidyashchaya for opening in Russian regions so-called "juristical clinics" to help those who are under investigation and illegally convicted. The Institution has filed a petition on its own for inclusion in the list of so-called NGOs foreign agents. It was confirmed by Alexey Fedyarov, the leader of legal affairs. On 7 May Ministry of Justice of the Russian Federation has added Rus Sidyashchaya to the register of non-profit organisations, as a foreign agent.

=== The undesirable organization status ===
In the summer of 2024, Russian authorities declared Russland hinter Gittern, the German legal entity of the Rus Sidyashchaya foundation, an "undesirable organization".
