= Che (TV channel) =

Russian federal TV channel

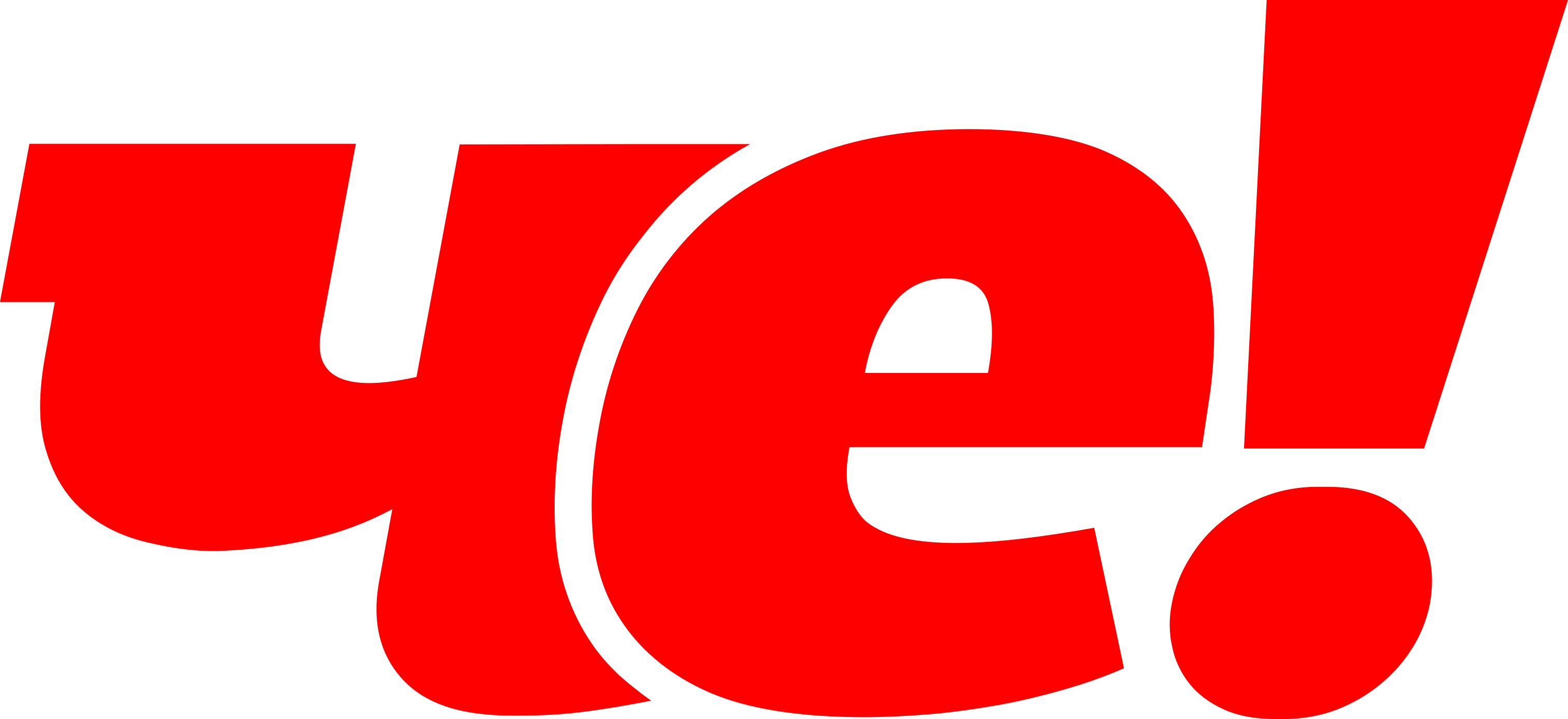
- Country: Russia

Programming
- Language: Russian
- Picture format: SECAM 576i (4:3 SDTV)

Ownership
- Owner: CTC Media and National Media Group

History
- Launched: 12 November 2015; 10 years ago

Links
- Website: https://chetv.ru/

Che (Russian: Че; styled Che! (Russian: Че!) is a Russian national television channel owned by STS Media. The channel is positioned as a men's lifestyle channel, but also airs content for a wider family demographic.

== History ==
=== 2015–2017 ===
Che started its broadcasts on 12 November 2015 on terrestrial, cable and satellite frequencies formerly used by Peretz. The channel briefly kept the name of its predecessor in printed publications, and its legal name, ZAO TV "Peretz" continued the same. In its early months, its ratings were lower than Peretz. In an April 2017 interview, STS Media general director Vyacheslav Murugov said that the change of the channel did not bring in positive financial results to the company and that its previous concept had been depleated. The channel then tried a strategy to attract both male and female audiences (equally), as well as launching Russian series and reality shows.

In early 2017, the channel signed an agreement with HBO to provide exclusive rights of some of its series. The goal was to increase its ratings..

=== 2017–2018 ===
The channel rebranded for the first time on 31 July 2017. The new visual identity presented the four elements attributed to che: risk, challenge, strength and motion. The slogan became "TV with a strong character", while the 2017-2018 season had its own slogan: "Heroes are everywhere". The new logo was selected as a result of an online viewer poll.

On 20 June 2018, in homage to the main trainer of the Russian national football team Stanislav Cherchesov, the channel (in the middle of the 2018 FIFA World Cup held in Russia) was temporarily named Stanislav Che, after the team made it to the play-offs of the World Cup for the first time in 1986 (when it was still the USSR).

=== 2018–2020: Live with more intensity! ===
On 18 August 2018, Che rebranded and added an exclamation sign to its logo. Under the slogan "Живи ЯрЧЕ!" (literally "Live with more intensity!", forming a pun with the channel's name), the channel's schedule was reformatted to include more adventure-based programs, in all of its forms. The channel aired new seasons of its flagship shows Reshala and Utilizator. Some series had new seasons: prank show Shutniki, reality show Supershef and travel show Ryukzak. On August 20, it premiered Unbelievable Stories. There were also reruns of +100500 (old episodes on weekdays), Road Wars (with the 2.0 suffix) and Amazing Videos (new editions came in 2019). On November 19, 2018, it started airing the cooking show Dinner, which aired on REN TV from 2006 to 2017, this time presenter by Grigor Lyahovetski and the new name Ideal Dinner. On April 15, 2019, it started airing the reality show Brachnoe Chtivo, adapted from Cheaters, which was previously produced for DTV between 2008 and 2011, this time under a new presenter, Denis Grebenyuk, and under the new name Dangerous Liaisons. On November 5, 2019, a new program from Reshala presenter Vlad Chizhov began, Ostanovite Vityu!, dedicated to people fighting for justice.

On 1 February 2020, the channel upgraded to 16:9 widescreen. From February 9, the channel started airing reruns of the recently-finished STS sitcom Voronin's Family (Russian authorized adaptation of Everybody Loves Raymond on Sunday nights.

=== 2020–present: CHE, YarCHE! ===
On 16 March 2020, it premiered the television version of Elena Aleksandrovna's internet show Flying Supervision. Later on April 4 came the turm of Ivana Usachyova's You Are an Eyewitness, which was originally produced between 1995 and 2007; this time with user-generated content.

From 13 October 2018 to 18 April 2021, it aired reruns of the Russian-Ukrainian sketch show Calambur, then from 8 February 2021 to 24 February 2022, the Ukrainian programs Diesel Show (from ICTV) and sketch show Na troikh.

In December 2021, Che started airing the social reality show Lawyers with Biktora Raznitsina as the lawyer, alongside mediator Olga Mitrofanova.. 11 апреля 2022 года состоялась телевизионная премьера реалити-шоу «Заступницы»

On 21 October 2024, it premiered Find by ID, a program dedicated to online frauds and cyberbullying.

== General directors ==
- Ruben Oganesyan (2015—2016)
- Evgeniy Potapov (July — September 2016; interim)
- Lev Makarov (2016—2018)
- Elena Karpenko (since 2018)
- Vyacheslav Mugurov (2018—2022, as general director of AO STS)

== Criticism ==
=== Naming ===
According to STS Media, the name Che was derived from its association with other words, such as the Argentine-born Che Guevara,, the reason for which, in October 2015, the National Radio and Television Research Center solicited Roscomnadzor to revoke its license. Director of the center Aleksei Samohovalov explained his rationale in more detail:

"Che Guevara's identity is highly controversial. He was the leader of a terrorist organization and spent all of his life orchestrating coups d'état in several countries. It just happens now that Russia is fighting against terrorism [...], but one of the federal channels is named in homage to the most famous terrorist of world history. We aren't against the creation of a channel for men, but it should have another name."
