= Marianna Maksimovskaya =

Russian journalist and television presenter (born 1970)

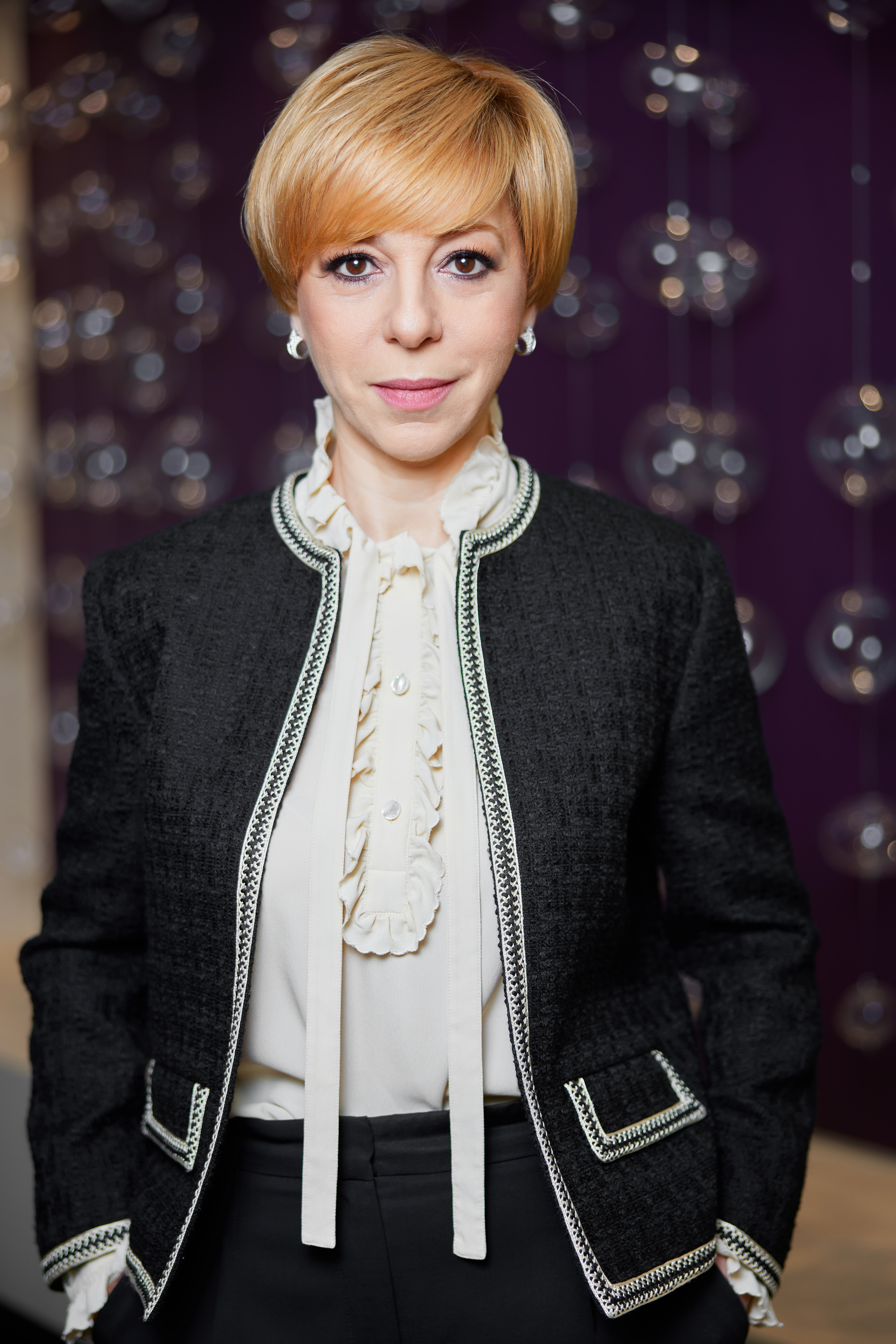
- Born: 7 April 1970 (age 56); Moscow, Soviet Union
- Education: Moscow State University
- Occupations: Journalist, television presenter
- Marianna Maksimovskaya's voice From the Echo of Moscow program, 8 September 2009

Marianna Aleksandrovna Maksimovskaya (Russian: Марианна Александровна Максимовская; born 7 April 1970) is a Russian journalist and television presenter. She presented the programme "The Week" which was reported as the last independent TV news source in Russia when it was stopped in 2014.

== Life ==
Maksimovskaya was born in Moscow in 1970. She studied journalism and graduated from the Moscow State University.

In 1993 she began working for TV companies as a presenter or a correspondent. She worked at the Russian TV companies ORT, NTV, TVS and TV6. She was an anchor and news presenter for Vladimir Gusinsky's NTV Station. In 2003 she was a deputy editor at REN TV.

In November 2005 REN TV fired Olga Romanova, the anchor of its daily 24 news flagship. Despite much publicity around the incident, her manner of reporting was continued by Maksimovskaya presenting "Week" for REN TV.

In 2010 Maksimovskaya was presenting evidence that coal miners were not only blocking methane detectors on her programme "Week". They were being encouraged in this practice by mine owners. The mine owners were offering bonuses and the build-up of methane was leading to the deaths of miners. The programme also interviewed Mikhail Khodorkovsky who is one of the Kremlin's leading critics.

She presented the programme "The Week" for REN TV until 2014. "The Week" was reported as the last independent TV news source in Russia when it was stopped in 2014.

In 2015 she went to work for "Mikhailov & Partners" and three years later she was leading that communication company.

According to media reports, in spring 2017, Maksimovskaya was considered for a senior management position at Sberbank. However, the bank's Board eventually did not approve her candidacy.

== Awards ==
She became a member of the Academy of Russian Television in 2007 and she has several TEFI awards.
