= Olga Romanova (journalist) =

Russian journalist (born 1966)

- Ольга Евгеньевна Романова
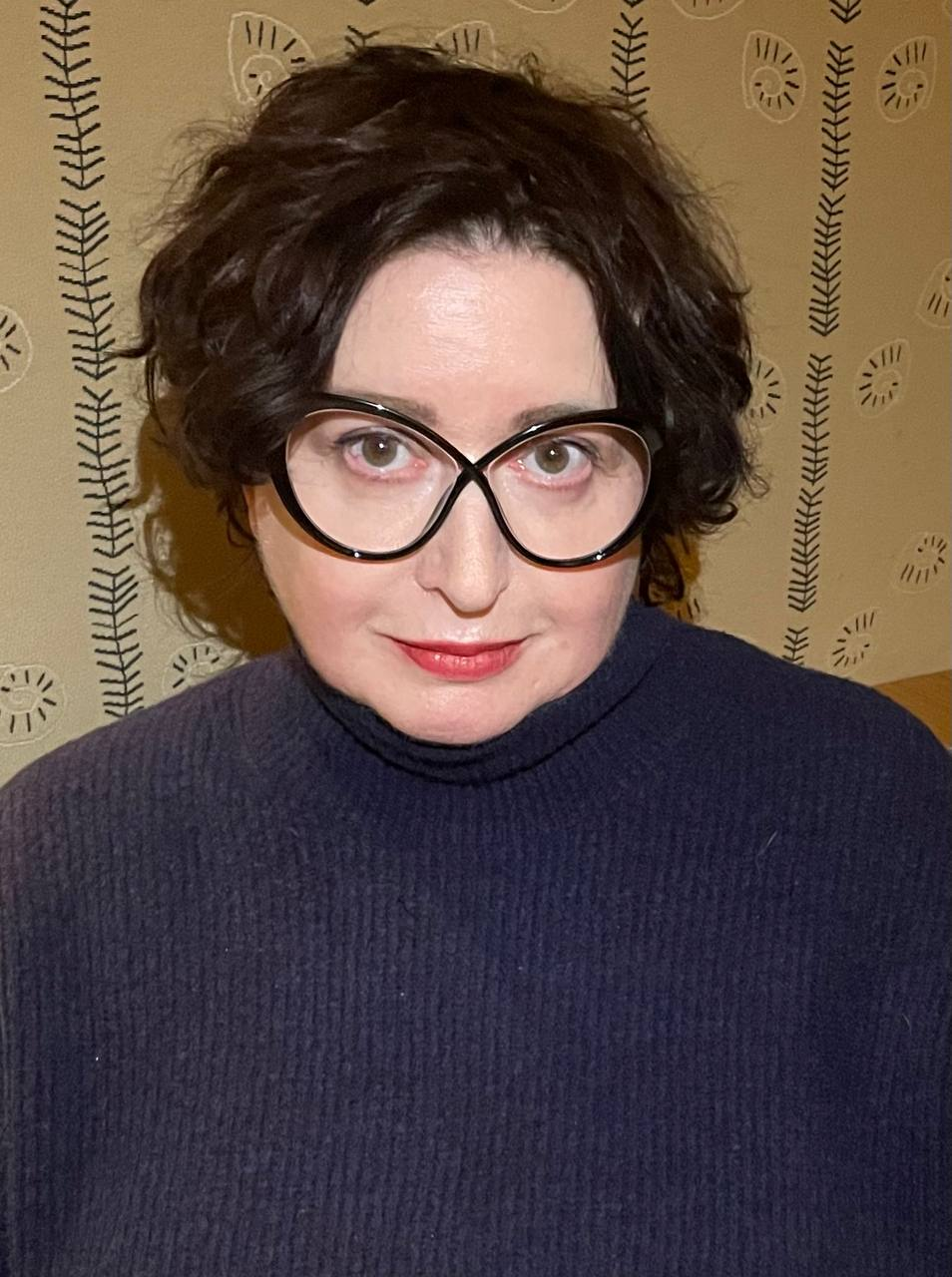
- Romanova in 2025
- Born: Olga Yevgenyevna Romanova; 28 March 1966 (age 60); Lyubertsy, Moscow Oblast, Russian SFSR, Soviet Union
- Education: Moscow Institute of Finance
- Occupations: Journalist, human rights activist

Olga Yevgenyevna Romanova (Russian: Ольга Евгеньевна Романова) (born on March 28, 1966, in Lyubertsy, Russia) is a Russian journalist and a director of the civil rights organization Russia Behind Bars.

== Biography ==
Olga Romanova was born on March 28, 1966, in Lyubertsy, Russia.

In 1988 Romanova graduated from the Moscow Institute of Finance, the Finance Department.

1988-1991 she was working as a journalist at the news agency "IMA Press".

1991 - 1994 Romanova worked as a Moscow correspondent for the Institutional Investor Magazine.

1994 - 1997 - Economy commentator in the newspaper "[Today]" (Сегодня).

1997 - 1999 - co-author and a host of analytic TV program "In Reality" (На самом деле) on the TV-Center Channel (ТВ Центр). Editor of the program "Big Money" (Большие деньги) on the NTV (НТВ) Channel.

1999 - 2002 - author of a weekly column in the newspaper "Vedomosti" (Ведомости), author and co-owner of a weekly magazine "FAS" (ФАС).

1999 - 2005 - host of the analytic TV program "24 with Olga Romanova" on Ren-TV.

Since 2005 - host of "Echonomics" (Эхономика), "Big Watch" (Большой Дозор), and "Special Opinion" (Особое Мнение) on Echo of Moscow.

2007 - 2008 - editor of the Economics department of The New Times.

2007 - 2008 - chief editor of the BusinessWeek magazine.

Since 2007 - Professor at the Faculty of Media Communications, Department of Journalism at the National Research university - Higher School of Economics.

2008 - following the arrest and imprisonment of her husband, Aleksey Kozlov, Romanova published his jail diary in her blog. In 2010 Romanova turned it into a book "Butyrka" (Бутырка). The same year Romanova founded a non-profit group "Russia Behind Bars" (Rus Sidyashaya) that documents the mistreatment of prisoners in Russia.

2009 - 2010 chief editor, contributor to Slon.ru.

In 2017 Romanova fled to Germany after claiming she was falsely accused of embezzling state funds.
