= Vladimir Kara-Murza Sr. =

Russian journalist and TV host (1959–2019)

Vladimir Kara-Murza
- Владимир Кара-Мурза
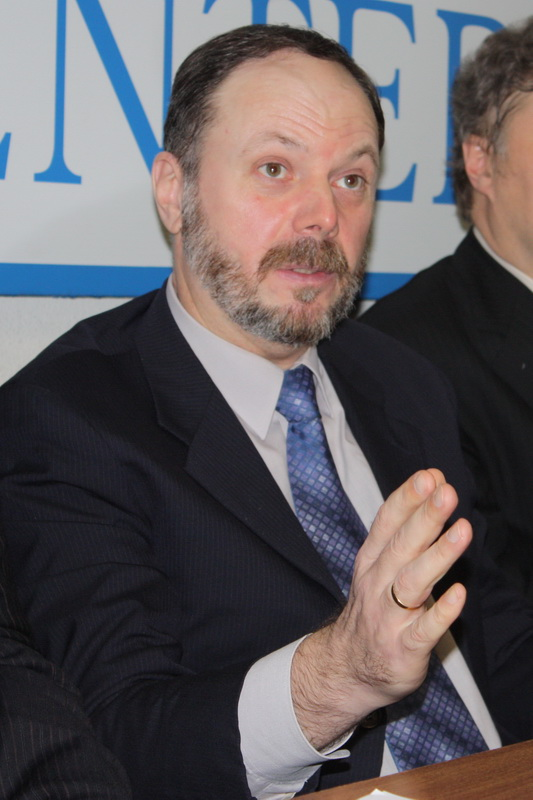
- Kara-Murza in 2011
- Born: Vladimir Alexeyevich Kara-Murza; 24 October 1959; Moscow, Russian SFSR, Soviet Union
- Died: 28 July 2019 (aged 59); Moscow, Russia
- Education: Moscow State University
- Occupations: Journalist and TV host

Vladimir Alexeyevich Kara-Murza (Russian: Влади́мир Алексе́евич Кара́-Мурза́; 24 October 1959 – 28 July 2019) was a Russian journalist and TV host.

== Biography ==
Kara-Murza graduated from the history faculty of Moscow State University in 1981; while at the university, he was nearly expelled for defacing portraits of Soviet leader Leonid Brezhnev. He taught history at school. In the 1980s, he refused state employment, citing his opposition to the Soviet regime.

In 1992, with the onset of President Boris Yeltsin's democratic reforms, he joined the weekly Itogi programme on Channel One of Russian TV—first as editor, then as correspondent. In 1993, along with his colleagues, he joined the newly created NTV, Russia's first independent television channel founded by Vladimir Gusinsky. In April 1995, Kara-Murza became the anchor of NTV's news programme Today at Midnight.

In April 2001, in protest at the seizure of NTV by the Russian government, Kara-Murza, along with other NTV journalists (Yevgeny Kiselyov, Viktor Shenderovich, Mikhail Osokin, Svetlana Sorokina), went to TV-6 channel, where he became anchor of the evening news programme Grani ("Angles" or "Points of View"). When TV6 was closed down by the government in January 2002, its journalists contested the competition for the frequency, and won, returning in June 2002 as TVS channel. Kara-Murza continued his Grani programme, which enjoyed some of the highest viewer ratings on Russian television.

In June 2003, TVS, Russia's last independent television channel, was removed from the air by order of the Press Ministry. From August 2003, Kara-Murza was the evening news anchor at RTVi channel.

He was the father of opposition politician Vladimir Vladimirovich Kara-Murza.

He died on 28 July 2019 after a period of ill health where he suffered from several strokes.

== Public position ==
In 2004, he became one of the founders of the opposition Committee 2008. In 2018, he was one of the trustees of Grigory Yavlinsky in the presidential election.

He was one of the critics of the policy of the current authorities and President Vladimir Putin, and in his publications regularly criticized the programs of modern Russian television and their presenters.

== See also ==
- Solidarnost
