= NTV Mir =

NTV Mir НТВ Мир
- Country: Russia
- Broadcast area: Worldwide
- Headquarters: Moscow, Russia

Programming
- Language: Russian
- Picture format: 1080i HDTV (downscaled to 16:9 576i for the SDTV feed)

Ownership
- Owner: Gazprom Media

History
- Launched: 17 December 2001; 24 years ago

Links
- Website: ntvmir.ntv.ru

NTV Mir (Cyrillic: НТВ Мир) is a Russian international television channel created in 2001, following the rift NTV International had as an effect of the NTV affair, in which former staff loyal to the old administration detached the channel from the main NTV service to create RTVI. Broadcasts began in December 2001.

== History ==
In September 2001, it became public that NTV's administration decided to create a new company, NTV Mir, to replace NTV International, registered in the Inter-TV company, which, following the scandals around the channel's owner, remained under the control of Media Most's controller Vladimir Gusinsky. NTV International attempted to suspended its broadcasts on the early hours of 27 September that year. After that, on 1 October, all NTV programs were removed from NTV International, causing it to resort to TV-6's output.

The current NTV Mir channel opened on 17 December 2001, becoming the new international version of NTV. On 6 March 2002, NTV and NSAB-SIRIUS signed a distribution agreement to enable its coverage on its satellites.

From 9 May 2002 to 27 June 2015, NTV Mir produced its own programs: Ours with Lev Novozhionov, Russian Filling, Alexander Zhurbin's Melodies to Remember, Golden Dust and Exclusive. Archived NTV productions from the past, as well as production from other channels, mainly its sister channel TNT, were also shown.

NTV America started broadcasting on 25 September 2002 as a version of NTV Mir tailored for the Russian diaspora in the United States. On 5 November 2002, it began broadcasting to Australia.

On 1 February 2003, it began broadcasting to the Volia cable company in Ukraine. On 1 March 2004, it won the Golden Pen award for the most popular foreign channel available in the country..

On 2 January 2006, the channel was removed from Estonian cable companies, as the leading cable companies Starman and STV refused to pay contracts for an array of Russian channels. Later that year, it was suspended in Israel after an Israeli court forbade it to air Israeli advertising. Broadcasts were restored there in August 2007, in a new format; as a paid channel from 15 August of that year..

On 9 August 2008, Georgian cable companies blocked the channel, as it was spreading misinformation on the Russo-Georgian War. On 1 April 2009, its broadcasts ended in Belarus.

On 24 July 2014, the National Television and Radio Council decided to ban NTV Mir, under the grounds that as it did not follow the requisites of the European Convention on Transnational Television and Part 1 of Article 42 of the Ukrainian law "On Television and Radio Broadcasting".

On 25 February 2022, the second day of the Russian invasion of Ukraine, the Lithuanian regulator banned a package of six channels, five Russian and one Belarusian, among them, NTV Mir. The decision came into effect on 26 February, with NTV Mir receiving a five-year suspension.

== See also ==
- NTV Canada
