= NTV affair =

2000–2001 Russian government takeover of a television network

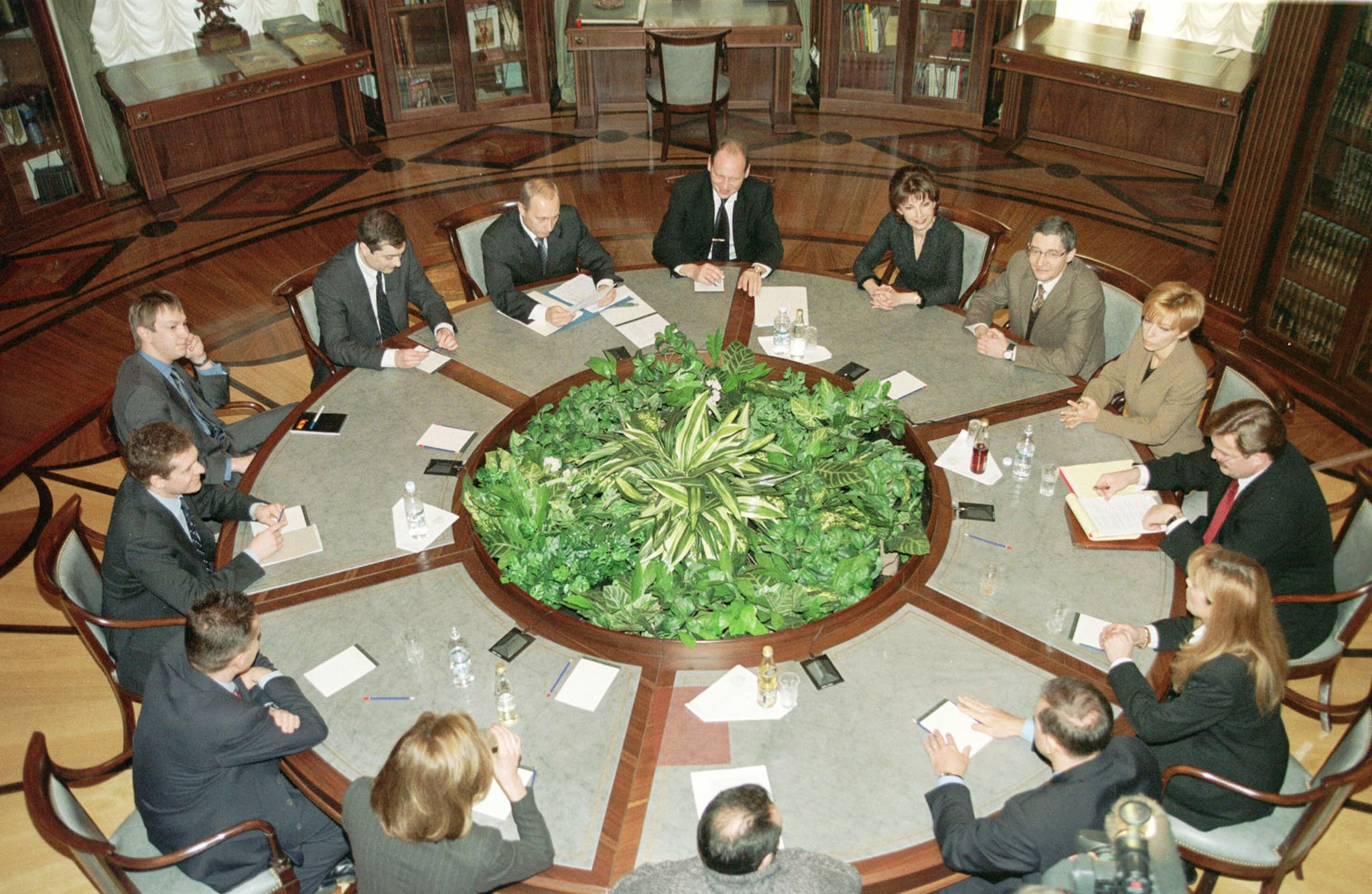
- President Vladimir Putin meeting with NTV journalists, 29 January 2001
- Date: 11 May 2000 – 14 April 2001
- Motive: Criticism of Vladimir Putin by NTV
- Target: NTV
- Organized by: Government of Russia, Gazprom (Gazprom-Media)

The NTV affair (Russian: Дело НТВ, romanized: Delo NTV) was a campaign of harassment against and a hostile takeover of the independent NTV television network by Gazprom and the government of Russia, lasting from the May 2000 raid on its offices by the Federal Tax Police Service and its 14 April 2001 buyout by Gazprom-Media, the media arm of Gazprom. The campaign has been widely described as politically motivated, with the intention of cracking down on opposition to Vladimir Putin in Russia and independent media. As a result of the buyout, media freedom in Russia substantially decreased.

== Background ==
NTV was founded in 1993 by Russian oligarch Vladimir Gusinsky as part of the "Media-MOST" media grouping, also including daily newspaper Segodnya, newsweekly Itogi and the Echo of Moscow radio station. From its early days, NTV became notable for its independent news coverage, particularly on the First Chechen War. NTV's coverage of the war brought public attention in Russia to atrocities committed by the Russian military in Chechnya, ultimately driving public opposition to the war.

After the 1998 Russian financial crisis Media-MOST amassed a significant amount of debt, and was forced to postpone its initial public offering as a result of the crisis. According to journalist Gregory Feifer, individuals describing the NTV Affair and campaign against Media-MOST as being non-political in nature have frequently cited this debt as a reason for the affair. Feifer, however, has rejected this claim, saying that "finances are hardly ever the explanation in Moscow — unless they have something to do with politics."

During the 1999 Russian legislative election NTV actively supported Yury Luzhkov, Mayor of Moscow and leader of the Fatherland – All Russia, who was one of the strongest opponents of President Boris Yeltsin and the pro-Yeltsin Unity party as well as a longtime supporter of Gusinsky. This brought it into a conflict with Public Russian Television, owned by Boris Berezovsky, which supported Yeltsin and Unity. Luzhkov's resounding defeat in the election, the appointment of security officer Vladimir Putin as Prime Minister, and the beginning of the Second Chechen War, resulted in increased pressure from Gazprom on NTV regarding the latter company's debts.

One of the most popular shows on NTV during the late 1990s and early 2000s was Puppets (Russian: Куклы, romanized: Kukly), a satirical comedy depicting Russian politics in a negative light. Puppets' portrayal of Putin particularly incensed the leader, and several individuals, including Gusinsky and independent media outlet The Moscow Times have cited the show as one of Putin's strongest grievances against NTV.

Shortly after Putin's victory in the 2000 Russian presidential election plans began to be drawn up to bring an end to NTV. Gleb Pavlovsky, an adviser to the Russian government, later admitted to having led efforts to crack down on NTV and Media-MOST from 1999 at Berezovsky's request.

== Police raid on NTV headquarters (2000) ==
On 11 May 2000, four days after Putin's inauguration as president, armed officers of the Federal Tax Police Service raided NTV's Moscow headquarters. The raid, which lasted 12 hours, was claimed by the Federal Tax Police Service and the Federal Security Service (FSB) as having been part of a broader investigation into Media-MOST which was unrelated to politics. Initially, the FSB claimed that it was a financial investigation, before later changing its story and saying that it was in response to illegal wiretaps. Gusinsky, however, rejected the government's claims, as did opposition politicians Grigory Yavlinsky (from the liberal Yabloko party) and Gennady Zyuganov (from the Communist Party of the Russian Federation).

Following the raid on NTV's headquarters, Gusinsky was charged with stealing $10 million in a privatisation deal and arrested. He subsequently fled to Spain.

Following the raid and Gusinsky's arrest, pressure on NTV further increased. A note from the Kremlin to NTV staff demanded that Putin's puppet be removed from Puppets, that the network stop criticising the Second Chechen War, and that attacks on member's of Yeltsin's inner circle cease. As a result of the pressure, Putin's puppet was temporarily removed from Puppets, with NTV Director-General Yevgeny Kiselyov commenting that "Because someone at the top is upset by the presence of a rubber puppet representing Mr Putin on the show, we decided to experiment by having one show without the Putin puppet." However, the show defiantly continued to mock Putin, with a skit portraying Chief of Staff Aleksandr Voloshin as Moses bringing down the edicts of God (Putin), who people were forbidden from seeing or naming.

On 12 June 2000 Alfred Koch was appointed as head of Gazprom-Media, the media wing of Gazprom. According to professor Cécile Vaissié, Koch's appointment was done with the understanding that he would participate in the impending takeover of NTV. Mikhail Lesin, Minister of Press and Mass Media, publicly stepped away from the case afterwards, in an effort to lend more credibility to the claim that the takeover was non-political. Igor Malashenko, NTV's Managing Director, proposed a deal by which Gazprom would buy Media-MOST for $300 million; this was equal to the group's claimed profits minus the debts owed to Gazprom. The subsequent events remain unclear, but a paper titled "annex number 6", guaranteeing Gusinsky's freedom if he agreed to sell the company, was drafted and later agreed to by Koch, Lesin, and Gusinsky, leading to the latter's release.

Raids on NTV's offices continued into 2001. Amid the impending buyout, CNN founder and American media mogul Ted Turner emerged as a potential saviour for the network. Turner offered to buy out the network for $300 million, enough to pay reported debts to Credit Suisse First Boston and pay off a 19% share in NTV's stock demanded by Gazprom which would have given it majority control. Koch disputed claims from NTV's staff that Gazprom's demanded shares would lead to a takeover of the network, insisting that he would sell it per a 17 November 2000 agreement to sell the shares to Deutsche Bank, and accused Gusinsky of negotiating with Turner behind the backs of Gazprom negotiators.

On 25 January 2001 Gazprom-Media was granted control over the 19% of shares in NTV per a decision by a Moscow court. Koch announced his attention to replace the board, promising to maintain the network's management. However, four days after the decision, Kiselyov announced that Putin had written a letter to the NTV staff supporting Turner's purchase of 25% of stock. The same day, Hungarian-American investor George Soros stated that he was also involved in Turner's effort to stop the buyout. Ultimately, Putin refused to give guarantees against political interference into NTV, leading Turner to abandon his operation.

== "Save NTV" protests ==
"Save NTV" protests
- Part of the NTV Affair
- Date: 31 March – 14 April 2001
- Location: Pushkinskaya Square, Moscow
- Goals: Prevention of the buyout of NTV
- Result: Protester demands not met

Parties
NTV; Union of Journalists of Russia; Union of Right Forces; Yabloko; Liberal Russia	Government of Russia; Gazprom

Lead figures
Vladimir Gusinsky; Yevgeny Kiselyov; Igor Yakovenko; Sergei Yushenkov; Boris Nemtsov; Irina Khakamada; Grigory Yavlinsky	Vladimir Putin; (Russia) Alfred Koch

Number
25,000 (claimed by Yabloko)	

In response to the impending buyout of NTV, liberal politicians Sergei Yushenkov, Boris Nemtsov, and Irina Khakamada of the Union of Right Forces, joined by Yavlinsky and the Union of Journalists of Russia, organised protests under the name of "Save NTV" (Russian: Захват НТВ, romanized: Zakhvat NTV) to draw attention to the network's plight in an effort to save it.

The first protests took place on 31 March 2001. The number of protesters present has been counted at between 8,000 and 20,000. Later protests were met with solidarity in other cities, such as Saint Petersburg. Kiselyov emerged as the face of the protests, leading speeches to supporters in Moscow. His 3 April removal as Director-General, performed by Gazprom after calling a shareholders' meeting, was publicly opposed by NTV's staff, which vowed to support him.

Among the Russian intelligentsia, opposition to the buyout was massive. Former Soviet leader Mikhail Gorbachev, appointed as head of NTV's advisory council on 17 May 2000, publicly denounced efforts against the network and appealed to the Russian people by saying "The people need a free press." An open letter by 122 Russian public figures was also published in Komsomolskaya Pravda and Moskovskaya Pravda in opposition to the planned takeover. It was also condemned by the United States and Germany.

== Capture of NTV headquarters ==
In spite of Gazprom's majority stake in NTV, the network's employees initially refused to accept the takeover after the 3 April vote that led to changes in board membership. On the morning of 14 April, employees travelling to the network's headquarters found the building guarded by an armed security force. They were barred from entering the building unless they signed a letter in support of the new leadership. Anchor Andrey Norkin was cut off amidst a broadcast at 8:06, being replaced by a pro-Gazprom journalist later that morning. In response to the capture, 25 members of the network's 50-person editorial staff resigned to move to the smaller TNT.

Boris Dobrodeev, formerly an NTV journalist, resigned his position as head of the state-run RTR to return to work at NTV. American investor Boris Jordan was installed as Director-General. Jordan's instatement caused protests from the Communist Party, with Zyuganov lamenting "In which other European country would it be possible for a foreigner to lead a nationwide television channel?" and Chairman of the State Duma Gennadiy Seleznyov proclaiming that he "could not imagine a more inept decision" than hiring "shady figures" Koch and Jordan.

== Legacy ==
The NTV Affair led to the end of the only independent news network in Russia, and has since been described by the BBC as a watershed moment in the history of Russia under Vladimir Putin and Russia's press. Scriptwriter Viktor Shenderovich has argued that the takeover marked a beginning of the "strangulation" of Russian media, while Echo of Moscow commentator Sergey Parkhomenko has blamed the events for resulting in the beginning of self-censorship in Russia.

Igor Yakovenko, former head of the Union of Journalists of Russia, has blamed the NTV Affair for resulting in a loss of interest in news among Russians. Kiselyov has also claimed that the takeover led to the emergence of the phrase "maski-show".

== See also ==
- TV-6 (Russia)
- TVS (Russia)
- TV Rain
- Echo of Moscow
- 2007 Venezuelan RCTV protests
- Shutdown of ABS-CBN broadcasting
- Merger of Skydance Media and Paramount Global
- "Death on the Rock" - documentary broadcast about Operation Flavius by Thames Television that led to the loss of its ITV franchise due to an alleged political motivations against airing it
