= RTVI =

International Russian-language television network

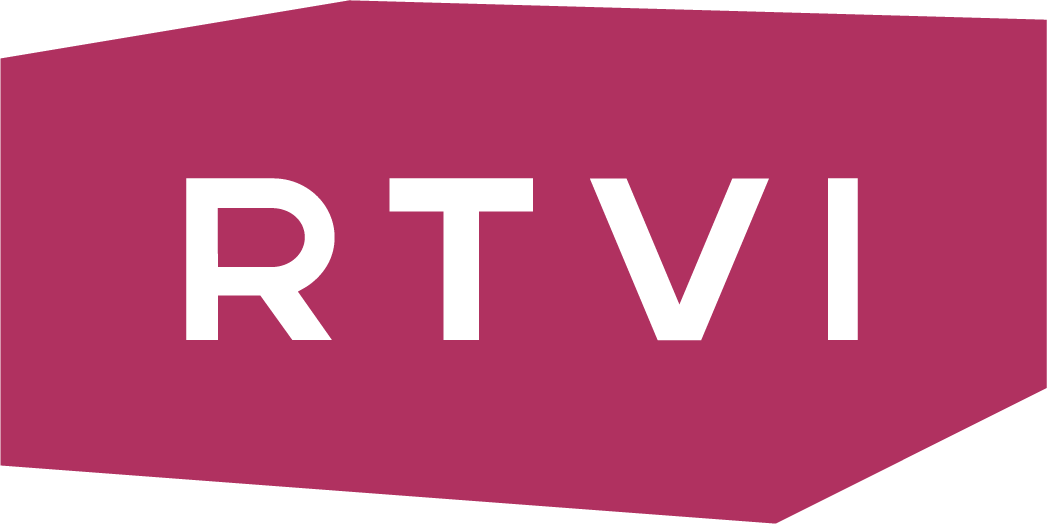
- Country: United States; Germany; Israel; Sweden
- Broadcast area: Worldwide
- Headquarters: Moscow; New York

Programming
- Languages: First languages Russian; English; Second languages German; Hebrew; Spanish; Swedish

Ownership
- Owner: Mikayel Israyelyan

History
- Launched: 1 January 1997
- Former names: NTV International (1997–2002)

Links
- Website: rtvi.com

RTVI is a global Russian-speaking multi-platform media, which includes a news website (about 4 million users per month) and other digital platforms (2.7 million subscribers): 6 YouTube channels, 2 Telegram channels and accounts in all major social networks.

As of 2023, it broadcasts in 159 countries. It has more than 350 broadcasting operators around the world and 20 million viewers.

Old logo of RTVi

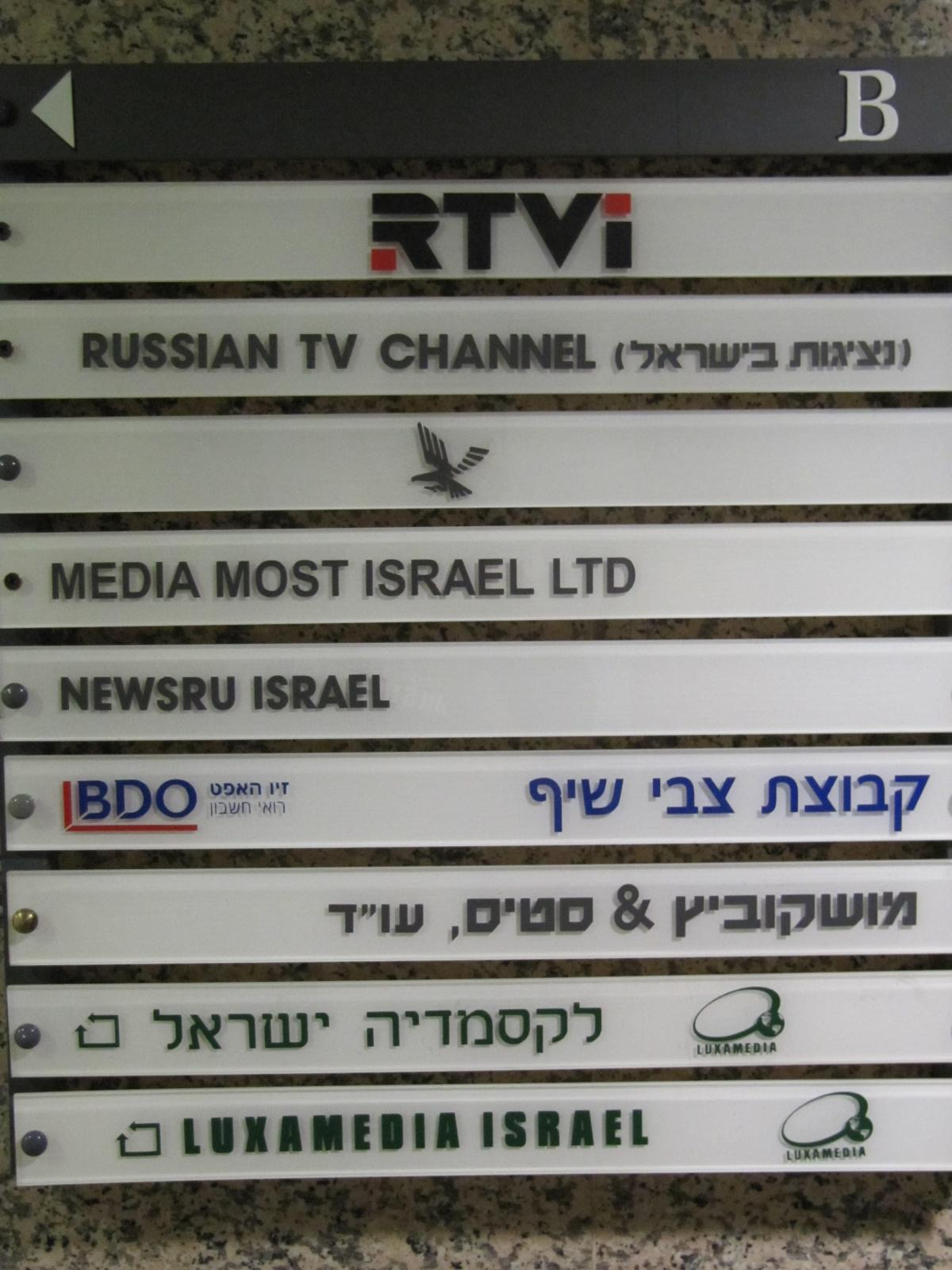
Subsidiary in Israel

== History ==
=== 1990s ===
In 1997, the channel was founded as NTV International by Vladimir Gusinsky, where it would serve as the "international, license-cleared version" of the NTV channel. Its main audiences were the Russian-speaking diasporas of Israel, the United States, and Europe.

=== 2000s ===
Following the Kursk disaster, numerous independent media outlets became very critical of Vladimir Putin who later would support an agenda for the state to gain control of these outlets.

Early in 2002, amongst the independent broadcasters were Echo (Russian: "Эхо"), and TV6:

Echo tv is the television version of the radio station Echo of Moscow, and was associated with Andrey Norkin and Vyacheslav Kriskevich. Kriskevich was a presenter of "Today on TV6" «Сегодня на ТВ-6», which was later renamed to "Now" (Russian: «Сейчас»).

TV6 was associated with Yevgeny Kiselyov. The channel aired the program "Grani" (Russian: "Грани") by Vladimir Kara-Murza, who was an advisor to Vladimir Putin opponent Boris Nemtsov. TV6 would later rename itself to TVS.

In April 2002, Echo tv and TV6 (TVS) began offering their products to the channel NTV-International, which planned to change its name to RTV or "Russia Televion".

Both Vyacheslav Kriskevich and Andrey Norkin, who both had been employed by TV6, moved their support to RTV instead of TVS.

From 2004 to 2012, Vladimir Kara-Murza who received strong support from Mikhail Khodorkovsky, directed the Washington bureau of RTVi, until Ruslan Sokolov took ownership of RTV, which led to Kara-Murza's dismissal.

=== 2012, 2017, and 2019 ownership changes ===
RTVI was owned by the Russian businessman Ruslan Sokolov (Russian: Руслан Соколов), who was the former director of the Russian state TV channel Zvezda. Sokolov bought RTVI from Gusinsky in 2012.

A group of Israeli private investors purchased the channel RTVI International in 2017. In June 2017, the channel, which planned to enter the Russian market, was relaunched with the liberal TV Rain's pink colors in its new logo, and with new presenters and editors, some of whom were from TV Rain, or from the former NTV's independent editorial board. Vasily Brovko, Sergey Chemezov and Rostec were supported the relaunch as well.

In Spring 2019, Yulia Moskvitina chaired the board of directors, and Tatyana Druzhnyaeva headed RTVI as executive director.

In October 2019, the Armenia-born American Mikayel Israyelyan was named the new owner of RTVI.

Alexey Pivovarov had worked as a manager at STS, and he's a strong supporter of the old NTV. Pirovarov headed RTVI International until 2020, when he left RTVi to run his 2019 established YouTube channel.

RTVI started broadcasting in Mali on the Malivision platform on 8 July 2025.

== Staff ==
RTVi's News Director till June 2020 was Ekaterina Kotrikadze. Russian journalist Alexey Pivovarov was appointed editor-in-chief in 2016. Pivovarov remained in this position till 25 June 2020. On 10 March 2022, the general producer of RTVI Sergey Shnurov announced the temporary termination of cooperation with RTVI.
