= Turn off the Light! =

Russian satirical television program

Turn off the Light! (Russian: Тушите свет!, romanized: Tushite svet!) is a Russian satirical television program, broadcast from 31 July 2000 to 21 June 2003. In 2002, the program won the TEFI award for the best entertainment program.

The program is based on two cartoon characters of the Soviet era (1970s), a piglet and a baby hare, Khryusha and Stepashka (Хрюша и Степашка) from Spokoynoy nochi, malyshi!, but now grown to adulthood and known as Khryun Morzhov (Хрюн Моржов, allusion to a "mat" expression Хрен моржовый - "walrus dick") and Stepan Kapusta (Степан Капуста "Stepan Cabbage"). The original puppets were replaced with motion-capture animation caricatures done by Studio Pilot. The main characters form a contrasting double act, Stepan is the cultivated intellectual, while Khryun is a lower-class or rustic type with an aphoristic mode of expression (his catchphrase expressing approval, "Мощно задвинул! Внушаить" - "You're mighty said! Real catchy", became widely popular).

Initially, the program was broadcast on NTV (at the time a subsidiary of Vladimir Gusinsky's company Media-Most, before state-owned Gazprom's takeover of the latter, resulting in the formation of Gazprom Media), and hosted by Leo Novozhenov. It later switched to TNT, TV-6 and TVS, with various hosts. After TVS was shut down in 2003, a second version of the program was started on NTV, called Red Arrow (Красная стрела), running until July 2004.

After the end of the program, the two characters continued to appear in Novaya Gazeta and Echo of Moscow until they were ordered shut down by President Vladimir Putin in 2022.
