= Alexey Pivovarov =

Russian journalist and TV presenter

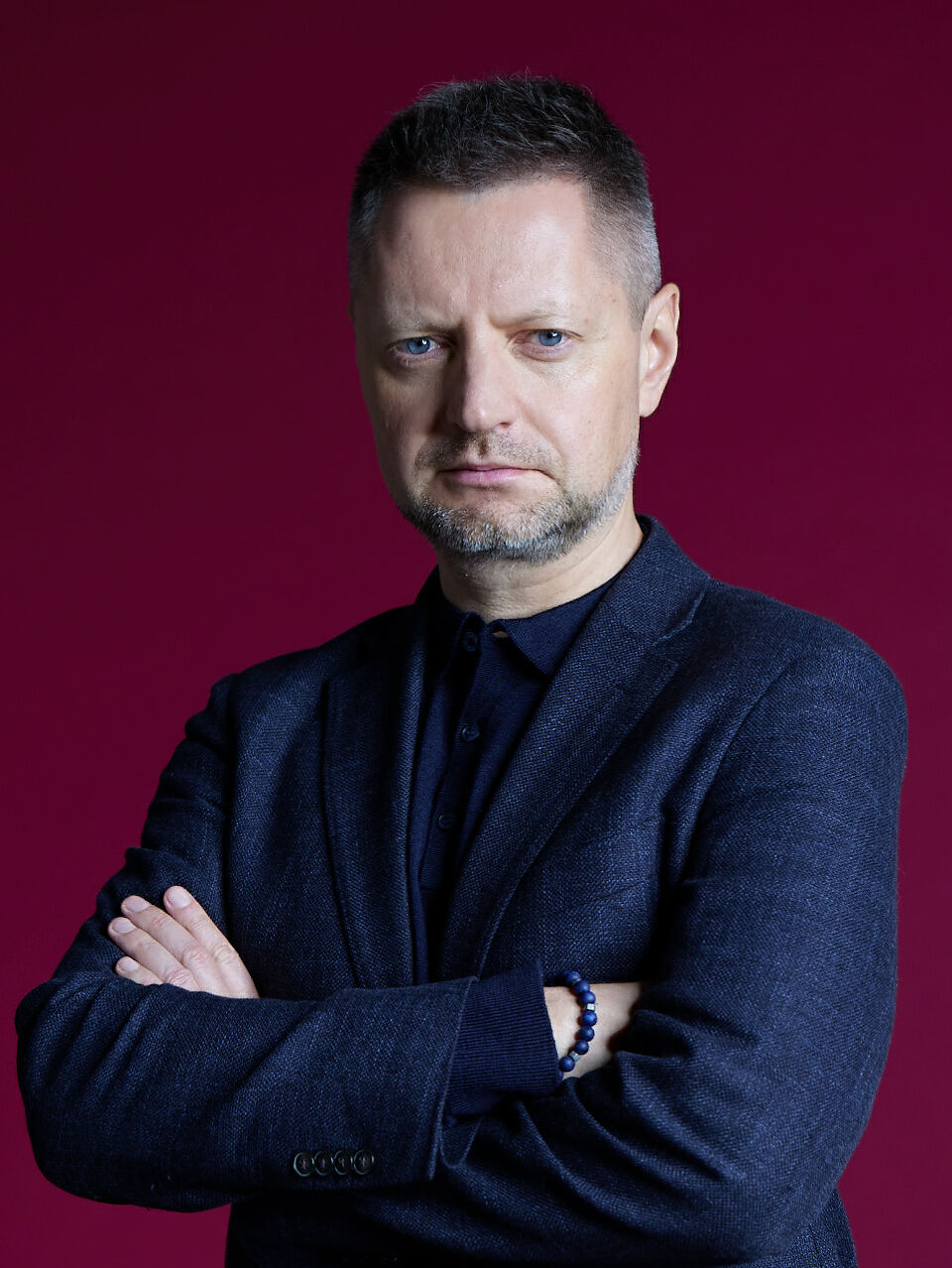
- Born: Алексей Владимирович Пивоваров; 12 June 1974 (age 52); Moscow, USSR
- Education: Lomonosov Moscow State University
- Occupations: Journalist, Film Director, Producer & Media Manager
- Spouse: Anna Schneider
- Children: 2

YouTube information
- Channel: Redaktsiya
- Subscribers: 4.08 million
- Last updated: February 2024

Alexey Pivovarov (Russian: Алексей Владимирович Пивоваров, born June 12, 1974) is a Russian journalist, media manager and documentary filmmaker. His YouTube channel Redaktsiya (eng: The Editorial Office) has amassed 4.4 million subscribers. In 2022, the Russian Ministry of Justice placed Pivovarov on the foreign agents list for his condemnation of the Russian invasion of Ukraine and longstanding critical attitude toward the Russian authorities.

== Life and career ==
Alexey Pivovarov was born on June 12, 1974, in Soviet Moscow. He began his journalism career at the age of 14 as a correspondent at the Vsesoyuznoye radio. During his undergraduate studies, he hosted at Radio Maximum.

After graduating from the Lomonosov MSU Faculty of Journalism, Pivovarov worked as a TV reporter, news anchor, and later as a film producer at the first independent Russian TV channel — NTV. Pivovarov’s most notable work there was alongside famous Russian journalist Leonid Parfyonov in his program Namedni. It has been considered the gold standard of journalism and was awarded the TEFI award numerous times, including a personal TEFI for Pivovarov in 2004.

Since February 2003, Pivovarov had been anchoring the evening news but was suspended for making a scathing on-air comment about his Namedni colleague’s unfair dismissal. Pivovarov told the audience that Leonid Parfyonov had proved it “might be better to write than to talk in Russia”. When Pivovarov was reinstated, he was barred from prime time and became the anchor of the nightly news digest Today; thus, he began producing and starring in his own infotainment projects.

In 2011, the news agency Reuters called Pivovarov “an unlikely opposition hero” after Kommersant reported that Pivovarov refused to anchor the news on December 8, 2011 if he could not inform viewers about the ongoing protests in Moscow which were being ignored by all state-controlled media. The next day, NTV covered the demonstrations in the Evening news and other channels followed suit.

Working on NTV Channel, Pivovarov has done interviews with prominent political figures of the day, such as U.S. Secretary of State Condoleezza Rice.

In 2013, Pivovarov left NTV to lead CTC Media TV Channel, launched by a Ukrainian film producer and media manager Alexander Rodnyansky. Under Pivovarov’s leadership, CTC Media grew its share in the younger demographic viewership.

In 2016, Pivovarov was appointed an Executive Producer and Editor-in-Chief of RTVi, the only global Russian-speaking TV channel with HQ in New York, NY. Under his leadership, RTVi has undergone a massive digital transformation into a modern multimedia organization, expanding its presence to all social media and mobile apps.

After launching in 2019 his YouTube channel, Pivovarov left RTVi in June 2020 in order to dedicate more time and energy to this project. In 2020, the GQ magazine named Pivovarov their Person of the Year and one of the most influential Russian-speaking journalists and YouTube personalities.

== YouTube Channel Redaktsiya ==
In 2019, Pivovarov launched his YouTube channel ‘Redaktsiya’ and a year later left RTVi to concentrate on this project. The first episode of Redaktsiya featured Ukrainian President Volodymir Zelensky.

Following the creation of Redaktsiya, Pivovarov was included in lists recognizing prominent creative professionals in Russia, reflecting his influence in Russian-language journalism and media. He became known for his long-form interviews and analytical reporting style, which contributed to his reputation as a notable public voice within the Russian-speaking media landscape.

== Personal life ==
Pivovarov is married to journalist Anna Schneider and has a son, Ivan, and a daughter, Varvara.

== Honors and awards ==
- 2005 TEFI award for his special report on the Parmalat bankruptcy
- 2007 The Medal of the Order "For Merit to the Fatherland II class civilian division for the hard work and 'contributions to the National TV development
- 2008 Russian Federation Presidential Certificate of Gratitude for the active social work targeted at civilian development of the Russian Federation
- 2009 ru:NIKA Award for documentary "Rzhev. The Unknown Zhukov's Battle."
- 2010 Person of the year by the GQ Russia, "a TV personality"
- 2019 Silver Play Button for achieving first 100,000 viewers
- 2020 Gold Play Button for one million viewers
- 2020 Person of the Year by the GQ Russia, recognized for taking journalist investigations on YouTube to a new level by covering the COVID pandemic in Dagestan and the Norilsk oil spill disaster.
- 2019 & 2020 Redkollegiya Award for a documentary about the 2016 Tu-154 crash in Sochi; and for the documentary about Covid-19 pandemic in Dagestan.

== Filmography ==
Pivovarov's work as director and producer includes the documentary The Term about the Russian opposition's reaction and protests to Vladimir Putin's third presidential term, Bread for Stalin about the Dekulakization -the Soviet campaign of political repressions of millions of kulaks (prosperous peasants) and their families; and also a five-part docuseries about World War II. Each film sheds new light on events of the recent past, deviating significantly from the version imposed by official Soviet historiography. In 2011, he produced and hosted a joint Russian-German documentary project about the events leading up to World War II.

- 2010 — My Sin (fiction, NTV)
- 2010 — Master (fiction, NTV)
- 2010-2011 — Dark Materials (documentary, head of the production, NTV)
- 2011 — Anastasiya Aid Center (producer, NTV)
- 2011 — Second Strike. Loyal Army Of Vlasov (docu-fiction, NTV)
- 2011-2012 — Dramatic Decisions (docu-fiction, NTV)
- 2011 — USSR. The Fall Of The Empire (documentary, seven episodes, NTV)
- 2011 — Yeltsin. Three Days In August (fiction, NTV)
- 2012 — A White Man (fiction, four episodes, NTV)
- 2012 — Patriotic. Great. (docu-fiction, NTV)
- 2012 — Bread For Stalin. Dekulakized Stories (docu-fiction, NTV)
- 2012 — Lokomotiv. Ascending Team (documentary, NTV)
- 2012 — October 1917. Why Bolsheviki Got The Power (documentary, NTV)
- 2012 — 6 sense (fiction, 16 episodes, NTV)
- 2012-2014 — Srok (Term) co-authored with Pavel Kostomarov and Alexander Rastorguev
- 2013 — Egor Gaidar. The Death Of The Empire (documentary, NTV)
- 2014 — Resort Police (fiction, 20 episodes, NTV)
- 2015 — Prank (fiction, 4 episodes, NTV)
- 2015 — Meteor (fiction, 8 episodes, NTV)
- 2016 — Red Easter (documentary, co-authored with Olga Belova, NTV)
- 2016 — 90s. The Cost. (docu-fiction, NTV)
- 2016 — Rasputin. The Investigation (docu-fiction, NTV)
- 2016 — 11 Great Che's (documentary, 11 episodes, only 1 episode was released in August 2017)
- 2019 — Russian Opposition Leader: The Life and Death of Boris Nemtsov (Redaktsiya/Youtube)
- 2019 — Kursk Submarine Disaster: The Sad Truth About the Explosion and Sinking (Redaktsiya/YouTube)
- 2019 — The TU-154 Crash over the Black Sea: How and why did the famous Doctor Liza and the Russian Army’s Choir “Alexandrov" die? (Redaktsiya/YouTube)
- 2020 — How did Vladimir Putin's presidency begin with the tragic apartment bombings of 1999
- 2021 — Pozner/Donahue Space Bridge. Did it end the Cold War? (Redaktsiya/YouTube)
- 2021 — The amazing story of Yuri Knorozov, who solved the mystery of the Maya civilization (Redaktsiya/YouTube)
