= Russian Youth Theatre =

Russian language theatre in Toronto, Canada

- Interactive map of Russian Youth Theatre
- Address: Toronto; Canada
- Coordinates: 43.77246°N 79.47300°W

Construction
- Opened: 1999
- Years active: 1999-ongoing

Website
- www.rctcc.ca

Tess Buchatsky as Clara in The Nutcracker, 2010

The Russian Youth Theatre was the first stationary Russian theatre in North America until 2012. Founded in 1999 by operatic bass Nikolay Cherkasov and pianist Andrew Kartuzov, the theatre promotes stage arts within Canada's Russian community with a number of semi-professional productions for all ages. Staged productions include Samuil Marshak's The Cat's Mansion and Twelve Months, Cinderella and The Dragon by Evgeny Shvarts, Town Musicians of Bremen, The Woes of Wit by Aleksander Griboyedov, There Was a War Tomorrow by Boris Vasiliev, Funtik's Adventures, Nikolai Gogol's The Inspector General, The Nutcracker, Pinocchio, Mama, Karlsson-on-the-Roof, Love's Sublimation, Snow White, Cat Leopold New Year Adventures, Love For Three Oranges and many others. Over the years, the Russian Youth Theatre's creative team has included artistic directors Nikolay Cherkasov, Valentina Souetova, and Gennadiy Dolganov, music director Andrew Kartuzov, choreographer Ekaterina Kornienkova, and costume designers Ekaterina Maryevych and Inessa Gorina.

== Awards and recognition ==
The Russian Youth Theatre has received various local cultural development awards, among which was the recent 2013 Prestige Toronto prize.

Between 2009–2010, the Russian Youth Theatre presented its most distinguished actors with a merit-based award. Its purpose was to recognize the excellent performances of its recipients and to celebrate their onstage achievements. The winners of the award were Elena Hasnash, Alexey Osipov, Dasha Bosaya, Nick Newcastle, Joseph Buchatsky, and Nikita Talerchik.

== Wit Works Woe ==
In 2009, the Russian Youth Theatre filmed the production of Wit Works Woe by Aleksander Griboyedov, in collaboration with the NTV Canada channel. The film was broadcast on television in 2010.

== Revival Dance Ensemble ==
The Revival Dance Ensemble was established in 2002 under the Russian Youth Theatre by choreographer Ekaterina Kornienkova. Based in Toronto, Revival presents a full range of dance styles of different cultures. The ensemble makes regular appearances at the Canadian National Exhibition, the Four Seasons Centre for the Performing Arts, the Folklorama Festival, the Matryoshka Festival, and other important locations and events.
