= Mitkov =

Mitkov (Bulgarian: Митков, Russian: Митьков) is a Slavic masculine surname, its feminine counterpart is Mitkova. It may refer to

- Dimitar Mitkov (born 2000), Bulgarian football striker
- Evgeni Mitkov (born 1972), Russian volleyball player
- Svetla Mitkova-Sınırtaş (born 1964), Bulgarian athlete
- Tatyana Mitkova (born 1957), Russian television journalist
- Vasil Mitkov (1943–2002), Bulgarian football midfielder
- Vlatko Mitkov (born 1981), Macedonian handball player
- Yordan Mitkov (born 1956), Bulgarian weightlifter
