= Behind the Glass (TV series) =

Russian television series

Behind the Glass (Russian: За стеклом [Za steklom]) was a "widely popular" Russian copy of the reality TV show Big Brother, first aired in 2001 by television station TV-6. Behind the Glass was the first television reality show in Russia, where six men and women between the ages of 21 and 24 living together in a glass apartment, filmed by 26 cameras. One way mirrors allowed pedestrians to see into the bedroom, living room and bathroom. Security guards protected the glass. Fans were charged 20 roubles to look in on the show. Former NTV producer Grigory Luibomirov, producer and director of the show, created the reality series.

== Background ==
According to TV-6, the original selection process for the reality show consisted of two stages. A group of psychologists, sociologists and doctors selected 12 people from several thousands, and then the audience selected the 6 winners. Six are considered "a reserve", in case one of the participants decides to leave before their time.

"The participants that TV-6 chose for the show seem to be selected in such a way so as that no individual immediately emerges as the winner or audience favorite. One of the girls is very pretty, but highly hysterical. Another is relatively homily, but frequently goes to the shower to show her body off. The guys are pretty much the same - one is charming, but fairly nimble minded, the second guy is smart, but unattractive, and the third is attractive, but pretentious."

== Popularity ==
The television weekly Novaya Gazeta voted Behind the Glass the top program and top TV event of November 2001, as well as worst TV event of the month. Half of all Russian viewers watched the program. Millions of viewers logged on to the website, zasteklom.tv6.ru, which crashed frequently because of the heavy Internet traffic.

== First season ==
The first season, launched on October 27, 2001, was filmed in the first floor of the Rossiya hotel in Moscow (which was torn down in March 2006). The ultra modern apartment was furnished by the show's sponsor, IKEA, a Swedish retailer, who opened its first superstore in Moscow in March 2000. During the 34-day first season, everyday around 3,000 curious Muscovites lined up to wait a half-hour to look for five minutes through the one-way mirror that opened onto the apartment. Costing over $1m, it was by far the most expensive TV show ever made in Russia. The series was so popular that TV6 aired the program three times a day, nearly doubling its network market share.

Competitors could accept the highest Internet bid from viewers to oust someone from the house, one player accepted $5,400. The television show could also use their discretion to send players back into the house, even after they had been voted out. One contestant was voted out every week.

The television show showed two females, Margarita and Olga naked in the shower, and two female contestants ran around the apartment semi-nude. This sparked angry letters to newspapers and heated talk show discussion. When Sasha got involved with Margarita in the shower, which took up the majority of the television episode, his girlfriend went on a talk show to voice her displeasure. Sasha left the show in an attempt to make up with his real-life girlfriend, stating that his relationship with his girlfriend was more important than winning an apartment.

"The producers gave them each a fixed budget equivalent to an average Moscow salary, and as a group they can order groceries sent in. They have no access to television but are allowed video games and techno-rock on their headsets. Olga and Margarita dress in scanty clothes most of the time and sleep in their thong underwear, while Janna wears long-sleeved pajamas. All are required to work out once a day. They do their own cleanup when they feel like it. In the one nod to privacy, the omnipresent cameras never show them using the toilet."

The program season ended showing 63 seconds two contestants, Margarita and Maxim, having sex, filmed with infrared cameras.

Videos of the season were on sale which showed footage that was not shown on television. The first season ended December 4, 2001. Two winners, "the pouty, dark-haired Janna, the one woman who refused to remove her clothes or engage in any sexual liaisons, and the proud, quiet Denis" received the top prizes of a year's free rent in an apartment in a prestigious Moscow district, worth around $25,000.

Contenstants for season one included:

- Sasha/Alexander (replaced by Anatoly)
- Anatoly the circus performer;
- Denis an advertising manager of Armenian descent;
- Margarita a model;
- Maxim a musician
- Olga a 24-year-old strawberry-blond fitness instructor and lesbian;
- Janna a student.

== Second season ==
The second season, which began January 19, 2002, was called "Za Steklom: Posledny Bifsteks" "Behind the Glass: The Last Beef Steak". During this season TV6 was closed by Russian authorities in January 2002, but the production continued and the contestants decided to stay on, after being convinced that it wasn't a prank. The show broadcast switched to TNT channel and also continued to be broadcast over the internet.

In the second season, the same week that the television station was closed down, the 12 participants opened two competing restaurants next to the apartment they were living in. Each six-member team was given 1 million rubles to start up a food business that anyone can visit for a cover charge of 300 to 500 rubles, which excludes the price of the food. A week later, viewers began to vote off participants until only one remained. The winner then got the chance to open his own restaurant.

== Third season ==
From June 1, 2002 to July 6, 2002, after the TV6 staffers got a new license under the TVS logo, the third instalment of the series aired, called "Behind the Glass: You're in the Army Now."

== Legal problems ==
Endemol, the company that created the Big Brother concept demanded that TV6 pay a license fee, as do the other 20 networks around the world that air versions of Big Brother. TV-6 press representative Tatiana Blinova responded that Behind the Glass had nothing to do with Big Brother and that the idea for the show came to the director 12 years ago after reading a Russian literary classic, an anti-utopian, sci-fi novel We by Yevgeny Zamyatin in which people live in glass houses so everyone can see what everyone else is doing. Endemol then threatened to sue.

== Criticism ==
Despite its popularity, Behind the Glass had its detractors. The youth group Moving Together, a Russian organization predominantly focused on clearing homes and libraries of "unhealthy books" conducted a letter-writing campaign against Behind the Glass. Russian lawmakers and veterans of the Union of Filmmakers argued the program was immoral.

The Moscow Orthodox Patriarchy spokesman Father Vsevolod Chaplin wrote in an open letter to all national television networks:

"It is highly probable that participation in this program will have a long-term negative impact on the personal development, family and intimate relations of the young people who are behind the glass. The program is rather loose, given that it is watched by children and teenagers. It has elements that depreciate a person's privacy, erode the holiness of marriage and the ideal of relations between men and women."

A survey conducted by the Russian Public Opinion Poll Center in 2005 revealed that 82 percent of Russians favored censorship on television, an increase of 19% from the same poll a year before. One in seven Russians drew attention to the nature of programs like the talk-show Windows and the reality programs Home 2 or Behind the glass.
