= Malivision =

Malivision is a subscription television network operational in Mali, established in its current form in 2002. It delivers its services exclusively through paid digital terrestrial television. As of 2025, it reportedly has around three million subscribers.

== History ==
Klédu Radiodiffusion, the trade name of TV Klédu (or Télé Klédu), was established in October 1995, installing its equipment next to the ORTM transmitters. The company relayed several channels on analog MMDS and distributed the DStv service to Mali. It competed with Multicanal, which offered a similar channel line-up, featuring channels such as M-Net, CNN International, SuperSport, Canal+ Horizons, CFI TV, RTL9, France 2, MCM and a few others. Initially TV Klédu, the company was renamed Malivision in December 2002. The provider converted its signals to digital in 2000, and to DTT in 2004.

In February 2012, extended its agreement with Conax in order to upgrade its encryption system. Sports channels were removed on 26 August 2013. That day, subscribers went on to its offices to show their frustration, calling it a "fraudulent action".

Its subscribers complained about certain channels being blank and that two channels were removed without prior warning. By September 2018, it was partly bankrupt and caused an exodus of subscribers. A "victims' collective" among subscribers was formed.

The provider illegally relayed beIN Sports in October 2019. Subscribers saw a message during its coverage of events. beIN Sports has no legal presence in sub-Saharan Africa.

Malivision entered a dispute with Canal+ in July 2021 over the distribution of its channels, after the company criticized the French conglomerate for "anti-monopolistic practices", as well as ceasing the carriage of the Nollywood channel, created by Thema in 2014; by then, Thema had joined the Canal+ Group.

On July 8, 2025, RTVI launched on the platform.
