= Russian television =

Russian television may refer to:

- Television in Russia
- Russian Television International
- Russia TV Channel
