= Behind the Glass =

Behind the Glass may refer to:

- Behind the Glass (TV series), Russian TV series
- Behind the Glass (film), Croatian film
