= NTV Plus Sport =

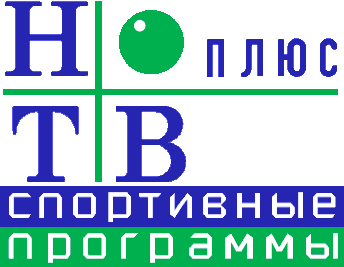
- Country: Russia
- Broadcast area: Russia

Ownership
- Owner: NTV Plus

History
- Launched: November 1, 1996; 29 years ago January 22, 2002; 24 years ago
- Replaced: TV6
- Closed: June 1, 2002; 24 years ago January 25, 2016; 10 years ago
- Replaced by: TVS; Match TV Planeta

Links
- Website: http://www.ntvplus.ru/channel?id=942

NTV Plus Sport is the first sports channel in the history of Russian television. Began broadcasting on November 1, 1996. It was one of ten sports channels produced by the NTV-Plus television company. The TV channel conducted its own broadcasts of the World and European Championships with professional journalists and commentators.

The TV channel broadcast all sports - football, ice hockey, basketball, tennis, rugby league, figure skating, boxing, swimming, volleyball, billiards, as well as other sports. On January 25, 2016, it was replaced by Match! Planeta and ceased to be available in Russia.

== History ==
=== Satellite broadcasting ===
To be added
