= Pyotr Marchenko (journalist) =

Russian journalist, radio and television presenter

- Пётр Марченко
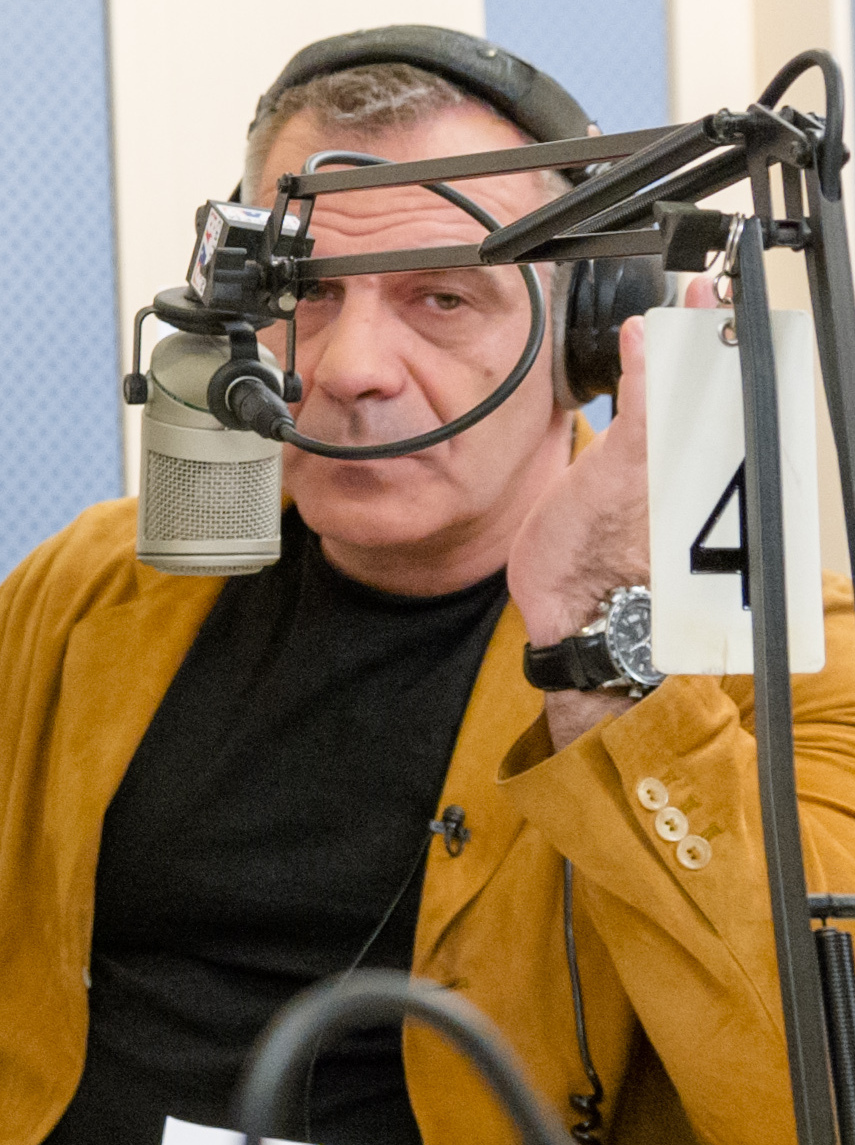
- Marchenko in 2014 at the studio of City FM
- Born: 23 December 1969 (age 55); Moscow, Soviet Union
- Occupation(s): Journalist, television & radio presenter

Pyotr Valentinovich Marchenko (Russian: Пётр Валентинович Марченко; born December 23, 1969, Moscow) is a Russian television journalist, radio and television presenter. He is the presenter of the weekday summary program News REN TV since 2015, previously the program Today on NTV (1996-2002) and the Sunday edition of the program Vremya on Channel One from 2003-2005.

== Biography ==
Marchenko was born on December 23, 1969 in Moscow to Valentin Petrovich (1932-1993), a journalist, documentary film editor and to Olga Efimovna (1934-2016), a research fellow.

He studied at the Faculty of Russian Language and Literature of the Krupskaya Moscow Regional Pedagogical Institute, but left the university of his own free will. He also studied for some time at the Faculty of Journalism of Moscow State University.

From March 23, 1992, he worked as a news editor at the radio station "Echo of Moscow", where he was hired by Sergei Fonton.

From 1996 to 2002, he hosted the news program Today) on the NTV channel. Initially, he hosted the morning and afternoon editions of this program. He first appeared on air as an NTV presenter on December 5, 1996, and his last time was on September 27, 2002.

After the old NTV team was forced to leave the channel in the spring of 2001, he agreed to work with the management of Boris Jordan. From April 14, 2001 until the end of August 2002, Marchenko (alternating with Kirill Pozdnyakov, later with Tatyana Mitkova) became the presenter of the evening editions of the program "Today". For some time, he hosted the news on Novosibirsk television.

In October 2002, he left NTV and moved to Channel One at the invitation of Konstantin Ernst and Alexander Lyubimov. According to some reports, this happened after his conflict with NTV editor-in-chief Tatyana Mitkova, as a result of which Marchenko, instead of evening broadcasts, began hosting morning and regional broadcasts (the presenter worked in this capacity throughout September).

For 6 years, starting in October 2002, Pyotr hosted the programs "News", "Time", "Night Time", "Sunday Time" (2002-2005, the last news broadcast was on July 10, 2005), "Good Morning" (2006-2008), televised debates of the 2003 parliamentary elections and the 2004 presidential elections.

He worked live on the air during the days of the apartment building explosions in September 1999, Yeltsin's resignation, the Kursk submarine disaster, September 11 attacks, the day the war in Afghanistan began, "Nord-Ost" and Beslan. He worked as a correspondent several times - on the day of the ER2-1117 electric train crash near the Bekasovo I station (on NTV, in July 1998) and during the vote counting in the 2004 presidential election (on Channel One, in March 2004).

He became a participant in the entertainment shows Guess the Melody, Russian Extreme and Empire, which aired on Channel One. In April 2006, he was the host of the documentary film From Tavrichesky to Okhotny, dedicated to the 100th anniversary of Russian parliamentarism. He left the channel in May 2008.

From 2006 to 2008, he was the host of the daytime broadcast on the Moscow information radio City-FM 87.9.

From 2008 to 2011, he was the host of the final information and analytical program "7" on the Expert TV channel. There he also held the post of head of the channel's information programs directorate. Since February 2010, he became the general producer of the Expert TV channel.

Since June 2011, he worked at Zakon TV as deputy editor-in-chief.

Since December 2011 he served as deputy editor-in-chief of the information radio station City-FM. From May 2014 to the end of February 2015 he was the editor-in-chief of the radio station. While holding leadership positions, he alternately hosted the programs "CITY-Life" and "Radio Room".

Since May 12, 2015 he is the host of the weekday final program REN TV News (since June 12, 2022 on Sundays - "Final Program") at 23:00 on REN TV.
