= Multicanal (Mali) =

Multicanal is a Malian subscription television operator. The company was established in 1995 by Ismaila Sidibé, who would later form Africable in the early 2000s.

== History ==
Ismaila Sidibé was known for his efforts to democratize access to information to Malians, especially of the lower class. In 1991, he started selling satellite dishes at expensive prices, though, in 1993, his breakthrough came when he installed MMDS antennas, in order to begin relaying French channel TV5. The TV5 relays were followed in 1995 by his turning point, the Multicanal subscription television operator. Much like its competitor, it offered a dozen channels on an analog MMDS system. According to Sidibé, this enabled Malians of the lower class to have "access to information and culture". The channels that were available on the company, including Canal+ Horizons and MCM, were impossible to obtain at the time.

By 2004, Multicanal was available in Bamako, while outside of the capital, it was trading as Mali Télévision. Throughout 2006, Multicanal was heavily targeted by piracy issues; it announced an expansion of its channel line-up for 2007, going from 33 channels to 55.

Digital broadcasts started before 2015; the company's name had changed to Multicanal Numérique. In November 2017, it was reported that some of its agents did not receive money since April, even though they worked seven days a week. This happened largely due to a problem that affected its servers in 2006.
