= Tatyana Mitkova =

Russian television journalist (born 1955)

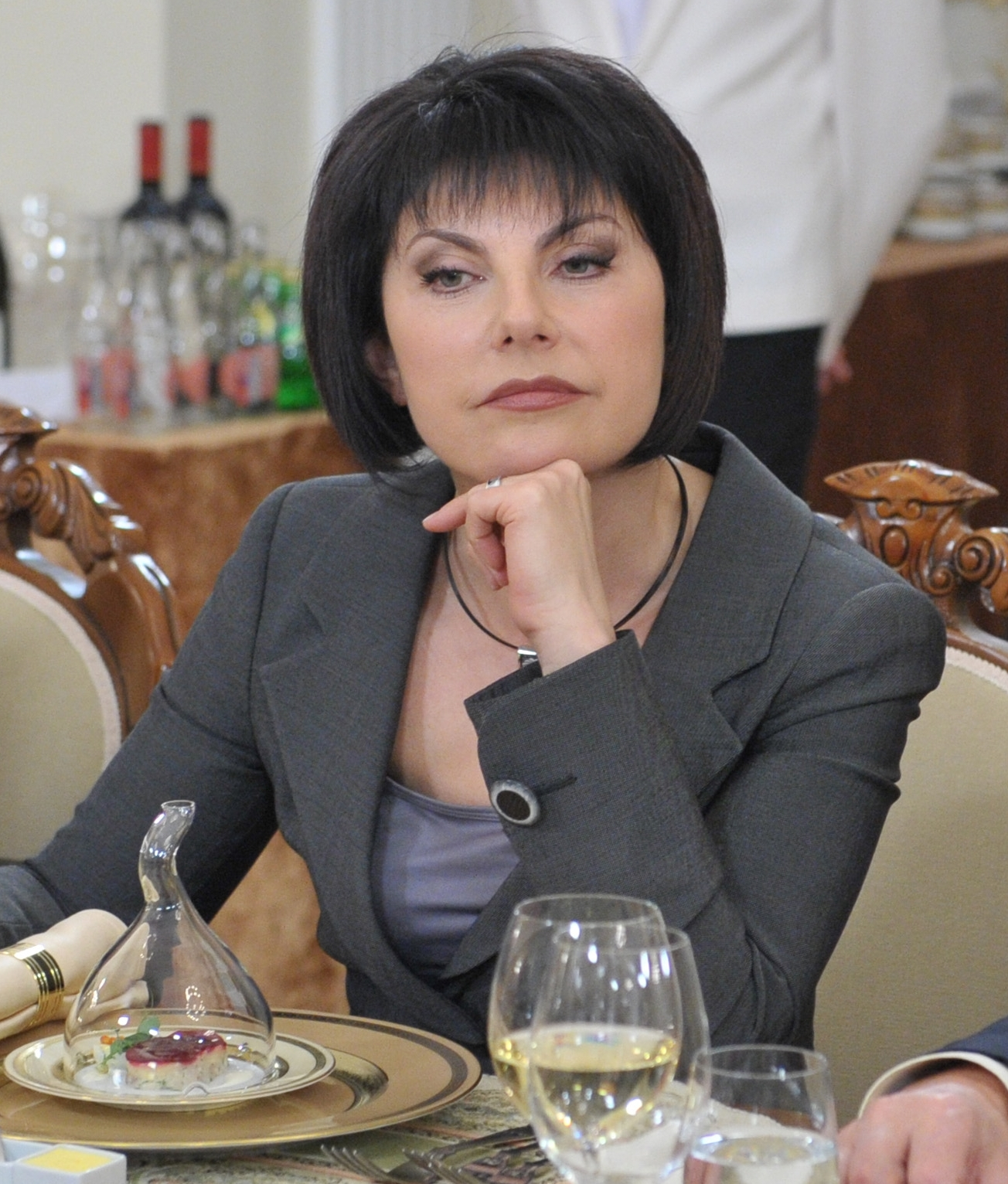
- Mitkova in 2012
- Born: 13 September 1955 (age 71); Moscow, Russian SFSR, Soviet Union
- Education: Moscow State University
- Occupation: Television journalist

Tatyana Rostislavovna Mitkova (Russian: Татья́на Ростисла́вовна Митко́ва; born 13 September 1955) is a Russian television journalist for NTV. She became famous in 1991 for refusing to read the official Soviet Union version of the military response to the uprising in Lithuania. In 2001, BBC News described her as one of Russia's "best-known news presenters".

== Biography ==
She was born on 13 September 1955, into the family of a Soviet officer, who participated in the Great Patriotic War, First Chief Directorate officer Rostislav Leonidovich Mitkov (1924-2020). She comes from the noble Mitkov family; according to family recollections, the journalist's grandfather changed the surname to "Mitkov" for fear of persecution of his family under the Soviet regime.

Tatyana spent her childhood in Switzerland, where her mother worked at the USSR embassy. She was fond of figure skating and choreography and wanted to enroll in a music school.

In 1973, she graduated from Moscow Specialized Secondary School No. 56 with an in-depth study of the English language. Later, she studied at the School of Young Journalists at the Faculty of Journalism of Moscow State University, and in 1974 she entered its evening department, studying until 1980.

As a student, she worked at the Soviet Central Television, where she held positions from assistant director (her first position on TV) to special correspondent. In the 1980s, she worked on the Central Television news program Vremya, the morning program 120 minutes and the program International Panorama. In an interview, she admitted that her editorial experience at International Panorama significantly influenced her further professional growth: among her teachers were Alexander Bovin, Genrikh Borovik, Vsevolod Ovchinnikov.

Since 1990, she has become the presenter of news releases of the Television News Service of the Soviet Central Television. In January 1991, she refused to read the official TASS report on the events in Vilnius on the air. Some time after this she was fired.

After her dismissal, she collaborated with the German broadcaster ARD, where she was invited by journalist Gerd Ruge.

In 1991, she received one of the first International Press Freedom Awards from the Committee to Protect Journalists.

In August 1991, after the failed coup of the State Committee on the State of Emergency, she returned to TV. In 1991-1993, she was the presenter of the daytime news on Channel One of the Ostankino Teleradio company. At that time, she made a report on the cooperation of the highest hierarchs of the Russian Orthodox Church with the KGB in the Novosti program.

In October 1993, she moved to the newly created NTV television company and began working as the presenter of the evening news program Segodnya. She hosted both the very first issue of this program (11 October 1993), and the first issue on the frequency of Channel 4 (17 January 1994).

She remained the presenter of the evening issues of Segodnya for 11 years - from October 1993 to July 2004. At various times, Mikhail Osokin (1993–2001, 2003–2004), Pyotr Marchenko (2001–2002) and Kirill Pozdnyakov (2002–2003) worked in turn with her as hosts of the evening broadcasts.

In January 2001, she was summoned by prosecutors to discuss an alleged $70,000 loan from NTV. The summons came in the midst of an attempted takeover of the station by Gazprom, and Mitkova described it as "psychological pressure and a direct threat to journalists". At the end of the month, a Moscow court gave Gazprom control of NTV's owner Media-Most, which was by then described by BusinessWeek as "Russia's sole independent national television station" and by The New York Times as "the last nationwide voice critical of President Vladimir V. Putin". Despite a lockout of some journalists who refused to "pledge loyalty" to the new management, Mitkova was persuaded to stay with the station by new owner Boris Jordan.

In 2023, Mitkova publicly supported the Russian invasion of Ukraine. Ukraine's National Agency on Corruption Prevention proposed imposing international sanctions against Mitkova for "organising and disseminating anti-Ukrainian propaganda". On 3 February 2023, the Canadian government added Mitkova to its sanctions list as a "Russian disinformation agent".

== Awards and decorations ==
- Order "For Merit to the Fatherland", 4th class (16 November 2011)
- Order of Honour (22 April 2014)
- Order of Friendship (27 November 2006)
- Russian Federation Presidential Certificate of Honour (26 July 2021)
- Russian Federation Presidential Certificate of Gratitude (23 April 2008)
- Russian Federation Presidential Certificate of Gratitude (10 July 2023)
- Commemorative Medal of 13 January (11 January 1994) Mitkova later decided to forgo the medal in solidarity with Dmitry Kiselyov, who had been stripped of it "for the discredit to the name of an awarded person". On 14 April 2014, President of Lithuania Dalia Grybauskaitė deprived her of the medal.
- CPJ International Press Freedom Award (1991)
- TEFI in the nomination "News Programme Presenter" (25 May 1997)
- Moscow City Prize in Journalism for 2001 (25 March 2002)
- Olympia National Award for Public Recognition of Russian Women's Achievements in the nomination "Journalist of the Year" (3 March 2005)
- TEFI Special Prize "For Personal Contribution to the Development of Russian Television" (3 October 2018)
