= Yevgeny Kiselyov =

Russian television journalist (born 1956)

- Евгений Киселёв
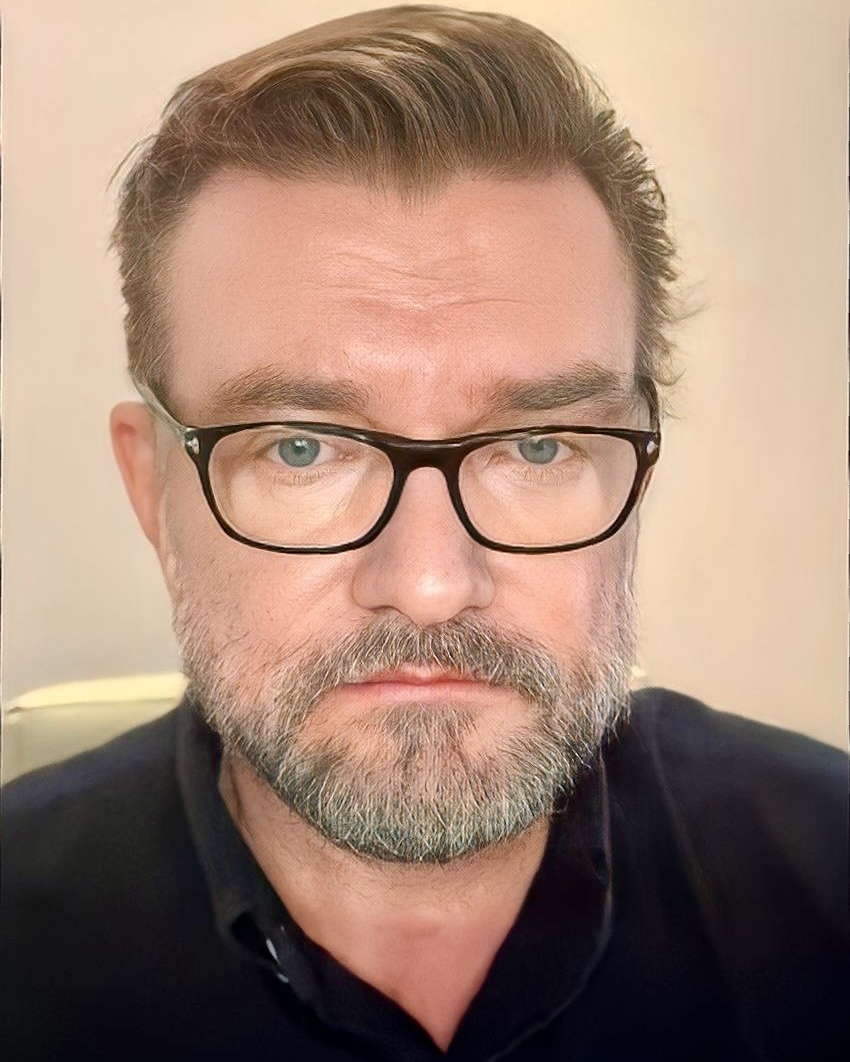
- Kiselyov in 2023
- Born: Yevgeny Alexeyevich Kiselyov; 15 June 1956 (age 70); Moscow, Russian SFSR, Soviet Union
- Education: Institute of Asian and African Countries
- Organization(s): NTV (1993–2001); TV-6 (2001–02)
- Awards: International Press Freedom Award (1995)

Yevgeny Alexeyevich Kiselyov (Russian: Евгений Алексеевич Киселёв, Ukrainian: Євген Олексійович Кисельов; born 15 June 1956) is a Russian television journalist. As the host of the NTV weekly news show Itogi in the 1990s, he became one of the nation's best known television journalists, criticizing government corruption and President Boris Yeltsin. In 2001, he left NTV following its takeover by the state-controlled company Gazprom, serving briefly as general manager of TV-6 before the government refused to renew its broadcasting license in January 2002. He later moved to Ukraine, where he became a presenter of various political talk shows.

== Background ==
Kiselyov is the son of an aviation engineer. A student in Persian at Moscow State University, he later worked as an interpreter in Iran and Afghanistan during the Soviet–Afghan War. He began his broadcast career with the Persian service of Radio Moscow in 1984, moving to television three years later. He became famous in 1991 when he refused to report official Soviet news as the USSR was losing control of the Baltic states.

== Itogi host ==
Kiselyov was a "pioneering" television journalist in Russia in the 1990s after the dissolution of the Soviet Union, and in 1997, the New York Times described him as "Russia's most prominent television journalist".

During this period, he hosted the popular weekly news show Itogi ("Results") on the independent station NTV. The show was modeled on the long-running US news program 60 Minutes. Kiselyov described Itogi's politics as "anti-Communist, pro-reform and pro-democracy", and it specialized in investigating government corruption. However, critics stated that the show was "excessively politicized", and settled scores on behalf of the station's owner.

In 1999, Itogi broadcast an episode in which Kiselyov broke new ground by lambasting the administration of Boris Yeltsin, describing them as "the family", an "insiders' code phrase" for Yeltsin and his small circle of advisers. He criticized them for handpicking the latest Cabinet, comparing Yeltsin's rule to that of the Roman emperor Caligula.

== Closure of independent stations ==
As NTV's managing director, Kiselyov was active in protests when a Russian court gave control of the station to the state-controlled company Gazprom, describing the takeover as an attempt by the government of Vladimir Putin to suppress dissent. In April 2001, he and several others were ousted from the board of directors by Gazprom. NTV's journalists condemned the cull, stating that the "ultimate goal of this meeting is the imposing of full political control over us". Along with a number of NTV journalists, he moved to rival station TV-6.

With the arrival of the NTV team, TV-6's ratings more than doubled. Kiselyov continued to report on sensitive topics including corruption and the conflict in Chechnya. He also became the station's general manager. In January 2002, however, the station's broadcasting license expired and was given by the government to another company, forcing them off the air. Kiselyov called it a "television coup" showing that the authorities' "single goal" was to "gag" the station. The government disputed his statement, saying that the non-renewal of TV-6's license was "purely a business decision".

In March 2002, Kiselyov teamed with the Media-Socium Group, a group of pro-Putin businesspeople that included former prime minister Yevgeny Primakov, and was re-awarded the broadcasting license to the station. A BBC News analyst stated that the new political ownership was "likely to ensure the journalists do not ruffle too many feathers above". The new station, TVS, soon ran into financial difficulties and quarrels between shareholders, and was closed by the government in June 2003 on the grounds of "viewers' interests". Though viewed as less critical than its predecessor, it had been the last television station to criticize the Putin government. With the station's end, Nezavisimaya Gazeta called Russia "the one-channel country", stating that private television had once again disappeared, and Ekho Moskvy criticized the "complete state monopoly of country-wide channels". Kiselyov stated that his priority following the closure was to find new jobs for the news staff, some of whom had now followed him through three television stations.

== Move to Ukraine ==
In 2008, Kiselyov moved to Ukraine. He stated that he moved because working in Ukraine allowed him to be a true political journalist. "In Russia, there is no open political debate any more. The authorities are hermetically sealed, we can just hypothesize about the discussion going on inside ... Here [in Ukraine] you have access to tons of information, to almost any politician". He also said that he felt Russian journalism had developed a culture of self-censorship.

Since September 2009, Kiselyov hosted a sociopolitical talk show called Big-Time Politics with Yevgeny Kiselyov on Inter. Kiselyov presented his (Ukrainian) shows in Russian; his guests spoke Ukrainian or Russian.

On 21 May 2010, the deputy head of the Administration of Ukraine Hanna Herman stated the wish, that Ukraine's most popular political talk shows be anchored only by Ukrainian journalists: "We are still victims to that imperial complex that 'everything coming from Moscow is good, everything Ukrainian is bad'".

The viewership of Big-Time Politics dropped from 1 million in 2007 to 500,000 people in 2011, reflecting a general decline in interest in political talk shows. In January 2013, Inter replaced Big-Time Politics with a political talk show hosted by Anna Bezulyk. Kiselyov was from then on in charge of news production at Inter. In the summer of 2016, Kiselyov left Inter. He then moved to Pryamiy kanal to present the program "Results". Kiselyov left Pryamiy kanal in the summer of 2019, and became the presenter of "Real Politics with Yevgeny Kiselyov" early 2020 on the channel Ukraine 24 (Україна 24). Ukraine 24 stopped its activities in July 2022. On 27 October 2019, Kiselyov founded his self-named YouTube channel, with the current handle @evgeny.kiselev. As of 29 September 2023, the channel has 326,000 subscribers.

== Public position ==
Evgeny Kiselyov has a generally positive assessment of Boris Yeltsin's presidency and a sharply negative assessment of Vladimir Putin's activities in power. He stated that the only thing he disagreed with the first president of Russia was the choice of Putin as his successor. In 2004, he became one of the founders of the 2008 Committee, a group of politicians and public figures who criticize President Putin.

In the fall of 2004, he supported the Ukrainian Orange Revolution, which he hasrepeatedly spoken about.

In March 2014, in an interview regarding the annexation of Crimea, he sharply criticized Russia's foreign policy towards Ukraine, saying that he did not want to be involved in a country that was committing aggression against Ukraine, and that he was ashamed to be a Russian citizen.

In September 2014, he signed a statement demanding "to stop the aggressive adventure: to withdraw Russian troops from the territory of Ukraine and to stop propaganda, material and military support to the separatists in Southeastern Ukraine."

On June 10, 2016, he announced the initiation of a criminal case against himself in the Russian Federation because of statements in support of Nadezhda Savchenko. According to the journalist, the case is under Article 205.2 of the Criminal Code of the Russian Federation ("Public calls for terrorist activities or public justification of terrorism") with a maximum penalty of seven years in prison. As part of this, the wife has already been interrogated and searched at her place of residence. Against the background of these events, Yevgeny Kiselyov, in an open appeal to the President of Ukraine, Petro Poroshenko, called on the state level to resolve the issue of granting political asylum to Russian oppositionists to the regime of President Vladimir Putin. On June 17, 2016, Yevgeny Kiselyov reported that Petro Poroshenko personally promised to assist him in helping Russian citizens who seek asylum in the country.

Kiselyov says about his religion: "I want to make a reservation: I do not belong to either the Russian Orthodox or the Catholic Church, I am an old—fashioned atheist and therefore I feel equidistant from both Francis and Kirill."

On September 3, 2017, in an interview with the head of the Security Service of Ukraine, Vasyl Hrytsak, Kiselyov stated that Russian special services could actively use Middle Eastern refugees in Western Europe to carry out various provocations.

Since February 2022, he has been a member of the Anti-War Committee of Russia.

On April 5, 2022, the Russian Ministry of Justice added Kiselyov and journalist Matvey Ganapolsky to the list of individuals who are "foreign agents." They were the first people to be included in this list, rather than in the list of media outlets that are "foreign agents." On July 15, the Ministry of Internal Affairs of Russia was put on the wanted list.

On February 22, 2024, Kiselyov was added to Rosfinmonitoring's list of terrorists and extremists.

== Criticism ==
Viktor Shenderovich — about Kiselyov's work in the Moscow News::

In the end, you won't be lost - you can find some other place to puff up your cheeks. You're a "brand"... and one last thing. Do you know what the main problem of Russian democracy is? Not in Putin, and not in the Chekists in general, and not in the nomenclature… The main problem is that ambiguous people like you are beginning to be associated with democracy and its values in the public consciousness.

Maxim Sokolov on Kiselyov's position on Ukrainian television:

The example of Russian citizen E.A. Kiselyov, who calls on Kiev TV viewers to kidnap other Russian citizens in the form of hostage trafficking, shows that in the 21st century, an acute conflict of loyalties may well arise, after which there is room for only one loyalty. Which I have to prove with all my zeal. When choosing a new permanent residence, it is wise to keep in mind the incident of E.A. Kiselyov, so that the 21st century does not overtake the future emigrant all of a sudden.

Assessing the role of E. Kiselyov in covering the 1999-2000 election campaign in Russia, Candidates of Philology and Associate professors of the Department of Periodicals at the Faculty of Journalism of Moscow State University L. O. Resnyanskaya and E. A. Voinova, and philologist O. I. Khvostunova noted:

To warm up the mood and stimulate the activity of voters, two technologies that are still reliable in Russia were used — compromising and myth-making, or exorcism and the creation of God. The role of the shock forces in pumping information to citizens was assigned to the so-called analytical, author's programs of national channels. "Gladiators" S. Dorenko and N. Svanidze (ORT and RTR) against another "gladiator" E. Kiselyov (NTV) played "bad" and "good" guys in a script not written by them, covering up the fight and bargaining in the virtual space for dominance in the political economic sphere of the property-deprived elites and "letting off steam" of discontent with the authorities.

== Family and personal life ==
- His father, Alexey Alexandrovich Kiselyov, is a metal engineer, winner of the Stalin Prize of the II degree.
- He is married for the second time to his classmate, Marina Gelievna Shakhova (pseudonym Masha Shakhova, born in 1956), graduated from the Faculty of Journalism of Moscow State University. She hosted the program "Dachniki", the producer of the program Fazenda, for the program on the TV channel Dachniki Shakhova received the TEFI-2002 award, as a designer she exhibited in the Small Manege.
  - Son Alexey Kiselyov (born 1983), was married twice. Since 2018, he has been married for the third time to actress Maria Fomina. Engaged in business, film producer, currently the creative director of the Nebo Film Company.
    - Granddaughter Anna Kiselyova (born 2018) is from her son's third marriage to Maria Fomina.
    - Grandson Georgy Kiselyov (b. 2001) — from his son's first marriage to Maya Tarkhan-Mouravi.
- Father—in-law - Geliy Alekseevich Shakhov. He was one of the heads of the USSR State Television and Radio Station, a journalist, was a correspondent in Kenya, former editor-in-chief of Foreign Broadcasting in the USA and Great Britain, shortly before his death translated Kerensky's memoirs, which were published in the early 1990s, met with Alexander Kerensky in the USA in the early 1960s.
- Mother—in-law - Erna Yakovlevna Shakhova- She worked as a translator for the publishing house "Khudozhestvennaya Literatura" and the NTV television company, was the lead editor of the editorial office of foreign literature of the publishing house "Khudozhestvennaya Literatura" and received the title of Honored Worker of Culture of the Russian Federation in 1996.

== Awards ==
- Order of the Cross of the Land of Mary, 4th degree (February 5, 2004, Estonia).
- Committee to Protect Journalists International Press Freedom Award (1995).
- TEFI Award for the best television analytical program (Itogi) (1996).
- Laureate of the Telegrand award, presented for contribution to the development of Russian television and radio broadcasting (1999).
- Laureate of the TEFI award for the talk show "Voice of the People". In the same year he was awarded the Golden Pen of Russia award by the Union of Journalists of the Russian Federation (2000).
