= NTV Canada =

Canadian Russian-language specialty television channel

- NTV Canada logo
- Country: Canada
- Broadcast area: Nationwide

Programming
- Picture format: 480i (SDTV)

Ownership
- Owner: HTB Canada Inc. (various investors)

History
- Launched: January 6, 2006
- Closed: November 2015

NTV Canada (НТВ in Cyrillic) was a Canadian exempt Category B Russian language specialty channel. The channel was owned by HTB Canada Inc.

It broadcast programming from NTV Russia and local Canadian content. NTV Canada produced weekly news program Today and Yesterday with Andrei Mazuruc and Stanislav Milashchenko, talk show Honest Talk with Luba Cherny, and arts and culture program Afisha (What's on) with Svetlana Dvoretskaya. The channel broadcast a variety of programming including seven live daily newscasts, talk shows, films, and popular TV series.

== History ==
On August 6, 2004, HTB Canada Inc. was granted approval from the Canadian Radio-television and Telecommunications Commission (CRTC) to launch a television channel called HTB Canada, described as "a national, ethnic Category 2 Russian-language specialty television service. The applicant proposed to offer a programming service targeting the Russian-speaking community, although 10% of all programming would be in the English language".

The channel launched in January 2006 as NTV Canada on Rogers Cable.

On August 30, 2013, the CRTC approved HTB Canada Inc.'s request to convert NTV Canada from a licensed Category B specialty service to an exempted Cat. B third language service.

In November 2015, the channel ceased operations, and no announcement was made about the pending shut down. As such the official day it ceased operations is currently unknown.

== See also ==
- NTV Russia
