= TVS (Russia) =

Russian TV channel

TVS ТВС
- Country: Russia
- Broadcast area: Russia
- Headquarters: Moscow, Russia

Programming
- Picture format: SECAM (576i 4:3) (SDTV)

Ownership
- Owner: Media-Sotsium Partnership

History
- Launched: 1 June 2002; 24 years ago
- Replaced: TV-6, NTV Plus Sport
- Closed: 22 June 2003; 23 years ago
- Replaced by: Sport

Links
- Website: http://tvs.tv/ (Defunct)

Availability

Terrestrial
- Terrestrial: 6

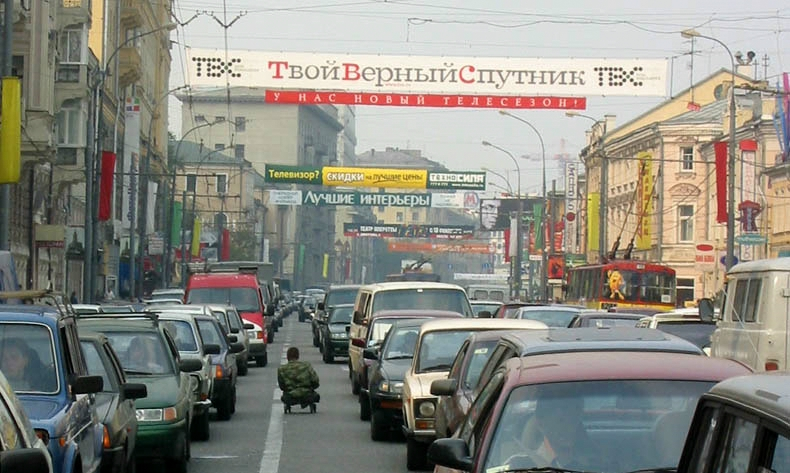
TVS channel advertisement, Prospekt Mira (Sukharevskaja)

TVS Television (Russian: Телекомпания ТВС) was a private Russian television network which was shut down by the Press Ministry of Russia on June 22, 2003.

== Creation ==
On January 11, 2002, a separate Russian television channel, TV-6 lost a court battle over bankruptcy and was placed into liquidation by a unanimous decision of thirteen judges of the Russian High Arbitration Court.

At midnight on January 22, 2002 the Press Ministry pulled TV-6 off the air. The frequency was temporarily filled with programming from the NTV Plus Sports satellite channel. The auction for TV-6's old frequency took place on March 27, 2002. The Media-Sotsium partnership won the frequency auction, becoming the licensee and broadcaster, with the employees of the former channel TV-6 forming much of the production staff.

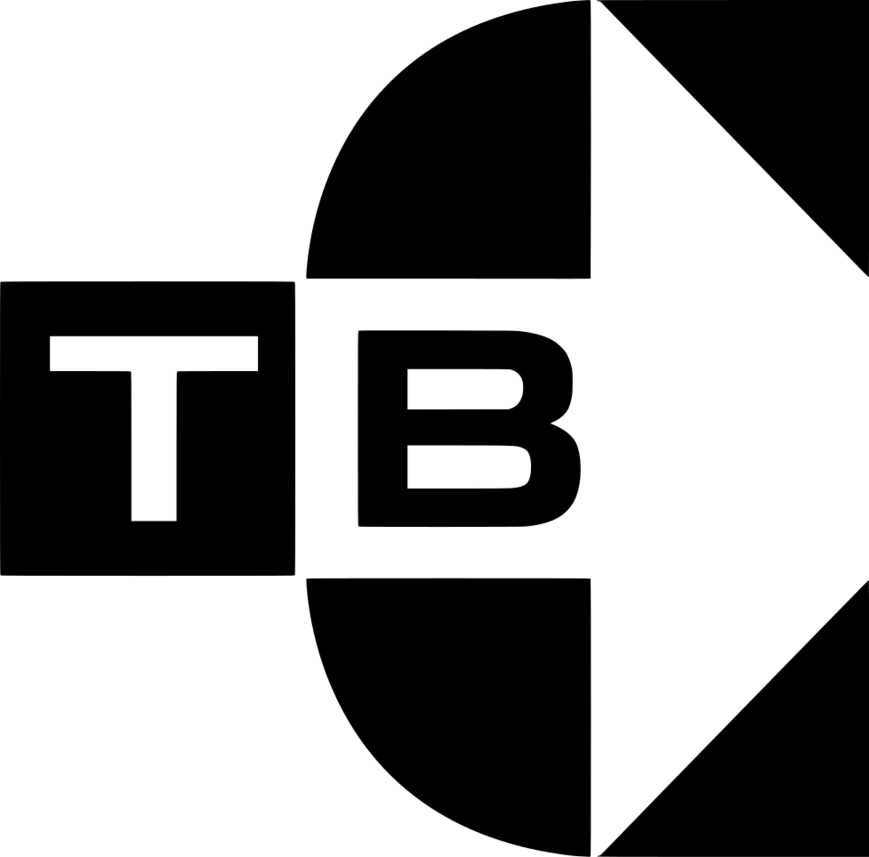
Logo used from June to September 2002

On June 1, 2002 TVS began broadcasting. On July 22, 2003 the Moscow Arbitration Court ruled that MNVK was taken off the air unlawfully.

== Editorial policy ==
Many Russians and foreigners consider TVS' editorial policy to be critical of the government of Vladimir Putin and Mikhail Kasyanov. It was considered to be the last channel with a completely independent editorial policy.

== Closure ==
Suffering from low ratings (the main channel projects, Dengi series and reality show Za steklom 3: Teper ty v armii failed) and poor advertising revenue, TVS had many financial problems. TVS's debt to Vnesheconombank (the Bank for Foreign Economic Activity) came to about US$100 million. TVS also owed more than $6 million in back pay to employees, who had not been paid for some three months.

Mostelekom (the city-owned cable operator that carried TVS in Moscow) began switching TVS' signal off Moscow's cable television networks on June 2, 2003, which rendered more than 90% of Moscow residents unable to view it. Mostelekom demanded that the TV company's shareholders pay off arrears of RUB 245,672m ($8 million).

On June 17, 2003 TVS editor-in-chief Evgeny Kiselyov announced that lack of funding had made it impossible for the company to continue operating, and that after June 23 the channel suspended broadcasting.

Stating it was "for viewers' benefit" the Ministry of Press switched off all TVS broadcasts on June 22, 2003 – 24 hours before the shutdown planned by station management was to happen. Like the closure of TV-6 the year before, the regularly scheduled programming was suddenly interrupted by a brief announcement that the channel was "taken off the air" before switching to a test. It was widely speculated in the press that such a hurried closure was performed to prevent the final broadcast of Evgeny Kiselyov's "Itogi" show, the only remaining opposition political broadcast at the time. Later MNVK allowed the state all-sports channel to broadcast on the vacant channel 6.

At the same time, former TVS employees moved to work on other TV channels, both national and regional or international (Channel One, VGTRK - Russia, Kultura, Sport and Vesti, TV Center "," The third channel "," The Fifth channel ", REN-TV, TNT, STS, 7TV, RBK-TV," TV Stolitsa ", RTVi, Euronews), on the radio" Echo of Moscow Most of the channel's employees for several years or have completely left journalism. Some of the staff went to small production production studios that worked with broadcasters under a contract. Many programs aired on TVS (which closed both with the channel and before the events of June 22) were subsequently restarted at different times on other channels, both on the above and on some others (among them - Domashny, DTV, Bibigon (now Karusel), Television Ladies' Club, Humor TV, Disney Channel, Twice Two).

== See also ==
- Media freedom in Russia
- NTV (Russia)
- NTV affair
