= TV-6 (Russia) =

Defunct Russian commercial television channel

TV-6 ТВ-6
- Final logo used from 2001-2002
- Country: Russia
- Broadcast area: Russia
- Headquarters: Moscow, Russia

Programming
- Picture format: SECAM (576i 4:3) (SDTV)

Ownership
- Owner: Boris Berezovsky (85% stake); Lukoil-Garant (15% stake)
- Parent: Moscow Independent Broadcasting Corporation (MIBC)

History
- Launched: January 1, 1993; 33 years ago
- Replaced: Technical Programme (1971–1993)
- Closed: January 22, 2002; 24 years ago
- Replaced by: NTV Plus Sport; TVS (June 2002)

Links
- Website: http://tv6.ru (defunct)

Availability

Terrestrial
- Moscow & Moscow Oblast: 6
- Other Russian regions: varied

TV-6 (Russian: ТВ-6) was one of Russia's first commercial television stations that began broadcasting on 1 January 1993 and was closed on 22 January 2002.

== History ==
=== 1991-1993 ===
Moscow Independent Broadcasting Corporation (MIBC), a Russian joint-stock company, was established in August 1991. Among its shareholders were Government of Moscow, JSC Logovaz, Mosbiznesbank, OJSC Lukoil, All-Russia State Television and Radio Broadcasting Company, Mosfilm and private persons Eduard Sagalaev, Oleg Orlov and Nugzar Popkhadze. In May 1992, the VHF frequency in Moscow (channel 6) was used to carry CNN International content two hours a day translated to Russian, using an interim license.

On 12 November 1992, MIBC won the competition to be allotted the sixth television channel frequency, ahead of the Russian newspaper Argumenty i Fakty and commercial radio station Europa Plus.

The same year, MIBC and Turner Broadcasting System signed an agreement to establish Russia's first private independent television channel named TV-6 Moscow, during Ted Turner’s visit to Russia.

Eduard Sagalaev became the first President of TV-6 Moscow.

Farrell Meisel was the Founding Director representing Turner Broadcasting on-site in Moscow.

=== 1993-1994 ===
TV-6 Moscow started broadcasting on 1 January 1993 for five hours a day (from 7 pm to midnight Moscow time), with 500,000 viewers in Moscow and Moscow Oblast (a federal subject of Russia). Broadcasting hours were extended to 10 hours a day by the end of 1993.

Until 1994, it shared with a minor channel "North Crown" (Russian: Северная корона), which was closed a year later.

It was originally an entertainment channel which broadcast talk shows, cartoons, music and series. TV-6 Moscow was the first in Russia to air foreign sci-fi series such as Babylon 5, Lexx, First Wave, as well as sitcoms Grace Under Fire, Married... with Children, and 3rd Rock from the Sun.

TV-6 Moscow was initially created as a joint Russian-U.S. commercial partnership, under which the Turner Broadcasting System undertook to provide it with movies and news and its Russian counterpart committed to create Russia's first private television channel that would represent the interests of Ted Turner in Russian regions, eventually becoming on what would be Russia's equivalent to Turner owned network TNT, due to the music on TV-6's idents and promos. As early as 1994, the agreement establishing the joint Russian-American television channel was annulled at the initiative of the Russian party, and in June 1994 the Turner Broadcasting System opted out as TV-6 Moscow's founder, due to MIBC mismanagement and its lack of capital.

A few years later, Aleksey Simonov, President of the Glasnost Defense Foundation, quoted Eduard Sagalaev in his book entitled The End of the Disobedience Party: “Our partners from the provincial city of Atlanta and from other American provincial towns came to work in our European capital, with a strong feeling that they arrived in some African country where, in exchange for a seashell necklace, they would get the right to the equal co-ownership of a television network that was to air to dozens of millions of viewers”.

Alexander Ponomaryov, whom Sagalaev appointed CEO of TV-6 Moscow in January 1993, shared his superior's view that a Russian team of young professionals, rather than American managers, was needed to open up the potentially highly lucrative Russian television market. This is how the host of MuzOBOZ Ivan Demidov became General Producer of TV-6 Moscow in Summer 1993. Alexander Oleynikov, director of the Moscow office of the Central Television of the USSR, became his deputy.

The reality was there were no professional Russian executives, who understood broadcast management.

The main goal pursued by Demidov and Oleynikov was to create and develop the entertainment television channel, something completely new for Russia. Within a relatively short time, TV-6 Moscow evolved from being a Moscow channel to being one of the top state television networks and a one-of-a-kind talent foundry for the new generation of Russian showbiz stars. After Turner pulled out, the Russians acquiesced to their government and towed the Kremlin line for the most part.

In Autumn 1993, Larisa Sinelshchikova headed, at the personal invitation of Ponomaryov, the newly established TV-6 Media advertising agency. At the same time, she became his deputy and Vice-President of TV-6 Moscow.

TV-6 Media was Russia's first TV advertising agency that was directly integrated into the channel, being also the latter's own sales house. Back then, Premier SV and Video International advertising agencies had a virtual monopoly in the Russian TV advertising market, selling 100% of ads on all TV channels. TV-6 Media, however, chose a distinctly different development model based on the independent work in the advertising market in the interest of TV-6 Moscow. As a result, the channel quickly became completely self-sufficient and was needed no public subsidies to become one of the most popular Russian entertainment TV channels.

=== 1994 ===
In April 1994, TV-6 Moscow started broadcasting in other Russian regions as a network channel: while it had its own frequency in Moscow only, TV-6 Moscow aired in all other cities and towns via the frequencies of regional TV companies that acted as intermediaries and were responsible for passing the television signal.

The same year, TV-6 Moscow started producing its own programs, Kineskop (Кинескоп) and POSTmuzykalnye novosti (“Post-musical news”, Russian: ПОСТмузыкальные новости), along with other original programs that created the channel's image: Ya sama (“Myself”, Russian: Я сама), DISK-kanal. Vsetsvetamuzyki (“DISK channel: All colors of music”, Russian: ДИСК-канал. Все цвета музыки), Apteka (“Drugstore”, Russian: Аптека), Doroznhy patrul (“Road guard”, Russian: Дорожный патруль), Moyo kino (“My cinema”, Russian: Моё кино), Katastrofy nedeli (“Catastrophes of the week”, Russian: Катастрофы недели), Vy – ochevidets (“You are a witness”, Russian: Вы - очевидец), Professiya (“Profession”, Russian: Профессия), Sdelay shag (“Take a step”, Russian: Сделай шаг), Muzhskoy klub (“Men’s club”, Russian: Мужской клуб), and many more. Much of TV-6 Moscow's broadcasting time was given to music, in particular MuzOBOZ, a program hosted by Ivan Demidov, and Akuly pera (“News tribe”, Russian: Акулы пера), a talk show.

=== 1995-1998 ===
On 9 January 1995, Cyrillic letters replaced the Latin ones in the channel's name and TV-6 Moscow aired as 'ТВ-6 Москва' for the first time.

The same year Ivan Demidov became Vice-President of TV-6 Moscow and Alexander Oleynikov filled the vacant post of the channel's General Producer.

In 1996, broadcasting time of TV-6 Moscow increased to 18.5 hours a day.

In March 1996, the channel launched its own news service and 6 novostey (“Six pieces of news”, Russian: 6 новостей), an information programme, in which viewers determined the “news of the day” by telephone voting and that news would become the subject of a special report the following Sunday. It was also at that time that the broadcast schedule featured Skandaly nedeli (“Scandals of the week”, Russian: Скандалы недели), an information and entertainment program dedicated to social life, and Katastrophy nedeli (“Catastrophes of the week”, Russian: Катастрофы недели), a TV show focused on accidents and natural disasters all over the world.

Much of the channel's broadcasting time was allocated to fun programs, such as Raz v nedelyu (“Once a week”, Russian: Раз в неделю), Nazlorekordam!? (“In spite of records!?”, Russian: Назло рекордам!?), 33 kvadratnykh metra (“33 square meters”, Russian: 33 квадратных метра), O.S.P. Studiya (“O.S.P. Studio”, Russian: О.С.П.-студия) and V subbotu vecherom (“On Saturday night”, Russian: В субботу вечером).

In September 1997, Larisa Sinelshchikova, who had by that time become Advertising and PR Vice-President at TV-6 Moscow, met Alexander Lyubimov, CEO of VID TV production company, at an event in the city of Surgut dedicated to the promotion of TV-6 Moscow in Russian regions.

In a private conversation that they had the following day, Lyubimov outlined to Sinelshchikova the development prospects of VID as a production company and suggested that she should consider the career of a TV producer and media manager.

In January 1998, Sinelshchikova leaving TV-6 Moscow and became CEO of VID.

=== 1998-1999 ===
In 1998 and 1999, TV-6 Moscow switched to the combined signal distribution system. The channel's own local branches started to open in various Russian cities as MIBC subsidiary enterprises (TV-6 Petersburg, TV-6 Vladimir, TV-6 Kemerovo, TV-6 Pomorye, TV-6 Perm and TV-6 Ufa), adding to TV-6 Moscow and regional partners and intermediaries.

=== 1999-2001 ===
In June 1999, Eduard Sagalaev sold 37.5% of his MIBC shares to businessman Boris Berezovsky who thus consolidated 75% of TV-6 Moscow.

On 3 June 1999, the former host of Vremya Sergey Dorenko was appointed Deputy CEO of TV-6 Moscow for Information and Political Programs. This appointment had an immediate impact on the channel's broadcasting policy shifting its scope from entertainment to socio-political issues.

In late March 2001, Badri Patarkatsishvili, the former Vice-Chair of ORT TV channel Board of Directors, became CEO of TV-6 Moscow. Alexander Ponomaryov spent some time as his first deputy and Igor Shabdurasulov headed the Board of Directors.

On 14 April 2001, following the appointment of Boris Jordan as the new CEO of NTV TV channel and the subsequent dismissal of over 350 employees, Boris Berezovsky offered Yevgeny Kiselyov the post of interim CEO of TV-6 Moscow and the dismissed journalists the posts on his own channel.

On 17 April 2001, Alexander Ponomaryov resigned from his post. Although there was no comment on the reasons behind this decision, many thought his resignation was related to Kiselyov's appointment as interim CEO of TV-6 Moscow.

The day before, Mikhail Ponomaryov, editor-in-chief of the TV-6 Moscow information service who had also submitted his resignation, stated in an interview that “as a citizen, an individual, a journalist and simply as a human being, [he] would under no circumstances work under the direction of Yevgeny Alekseyevich Kiselyov”.

On 14 May 2001, Deputy CEO Stella Neretina, General Producer Ivan Demidov, Chief of the Regional Service Yelena Zlotnikova and Technical Director of TV-6 Moscow Alexander Zolotnitsky left the channel right after the extraordinary meeting of the channel's shareholders, during which Yevgeny Kiselyov's appointment as a new CEO was given final approval.

The following day, Moscow-based daily newspaper MK published an article entitled 'BABskoye TV-6' (“Berezovsky’s TV-6”, Russian: БАБское ТВ-6), quoting Alexander Ponomaryov who commented on the situation as follows: “My worst fear came true”.

Most hosts working on TV-6 Moscow left after Yevgeny Kiselyov and his team came to the channel. The information service was also hit hard, with 50 employees laid off (out of 85).

From June to September 2001, Kiselyov decided to stop broadcasting most popular entertainment programs targeting the young audience, since they were out of line with the idea of a political TV channel, promoted by Boris Berezovsky on TV-6 Moscow. There were only a few entertainment programs left on the channel after the “purges”: Den zadnyom (“Day after day”, Russian: День за днём), Skandaly nedeli and Vy-ochevidets. Overtly politically-oriented programs, Itogo (“In all”, Russian: Итого) and Tushite svet (“Turn the lights off”, Russian: Тушите свет), replaced other entertainment programs.

The revisions to the channel's broadcasting policy were completed by September 2001. By this time, only one entertainment project had remained on TV-6 Moscow, namely Za steklom (“Behind the Glass”, Russian: За стеклом), the first television reality show in Russia. Journalist Marina Lesko qualified it as a “fresh uplift on an old face” in her article published in the Russian newspaper Muzykalnaya Pravda on 16 November 2001, adding that “its place is on MTV (instead of Undressed), rather than in the drain”, by which she meant TV-6 Moscow headed by Yevgeny Kiselyov.

At the same time, the number of foreign series fell sharply on TV-6 Moscow, replaced with Russian detective TV series Ulitsy razbitykh fonarey (“Streets of Broken Lights”, Russian: Улицы разбитых фонарей), Agent natsionalnoy bezopasnosti (“National Security Agent”, Russian: Агент национальной безопасности) and Banditsky Peterburg (“Bandit Petersburg”, Russian: Бандитский Петербург).

=== Closure ===
After the change of staff Lukoil in May 2001 started the court battle over bankruptcy which the station lost on 11 January 2002, and was put into liquidation unanimously by 14 judges sitting in the supreme arbitration court, overturning a 29 December 2001 lower appeal court decision reviving the channel and ordering a new hearing of the bankruptcy application. Two lower arbitration courts had decided against the network last in the fall of 2001.

An arm of the partly state owned oil company Lukoil, which owns 15% of TV-6, filed the bankruptcy proceedings in 2001. Lukoil used a law that grants shareholders the right to dissolve a company if its net worth falls below a certain level for two years. TV-6 stated that its net worth plunged in 1998 but rebounded last year, when the lawsuit was filed, and in 2002 exceeded the legal level. Under a new law which came into force on 1 January 2002, a minority shareholder such as Lukoil can no longer apply for a company to be declared bankrupt. But Lukoil argued that its appeal against the appellate court was valid because the ruling was granted three days before the law came into effect.

The electricity was shut off just after midnight on Tuesday, 22 January 2002, in the middle of the "Nightingale's Night" show hosted by Vladimir Solovyov while guest performer Mikhail Krug was singing folk ballads, ordered by President Vladimir Putin. At 12:02 am, the program stopped with Solovyov announcing the shutdown of TV-6 and bidding farewell before the channel switched to TV-6's logo on a white background with an isometric pattern on the left. At 12:09 am the channel switched to the Soviet-era UEIT testcard before, at 12:13 am, switching this time to a message stating "НАС СНЯЛИ С ЭФИРА" ("We were taken off the air") on the black background. Within hours of TV-6's closure, the station's frequency was allotted to an all-sports network which aired a live coverage of the 2002 Winter Olympics.

The staff of the station got a license for a new station, TVS, but because of financial difficulties, this station was also shut down by Putin in June 2003.

==== Views on closure ====
U.S. Department of State representative Richard Boucher said in interview to The Guardian: "There's a strong appearance of political pressure in the judicial process against the independent media. Press freedom and the rule of law can be best served by keeping TV-6 on the air".

CEO of VID Larisa Sinelshchikova described the situation as “a conflict between owners, rather than a political issue”, adding that “the closure of the TV channel is a measure of last resort pointing to the professional failure of the channel’s management and that of its owner”.

Deputy Chair of the All-Russia State Television and Radio Broadcasting Company Alexander Ponomaryov suggested that “a solution would have to be found, so that viewers could keep watching the channel and journalists could do their job”.

== Management ==
- Alexander Ponomaryov (President, CEO, January 1993 - March 2001)
- Yevgeny Kiselyov (CEO, May 2001 - January 2002)
- Larisa Sinelshchikova (Vice-President, Deputy CEO, April 1993 - January 1998)
- Ivan Demidov (General Producer, 1993-1995, Deputy CEO, 1995 - May 2001)
- Stella Neretina (Vice-President, 1994-1996, First Deputy CEO, 1996—2001)
- Alexander Oleynikov (General Producer, 1995-1997)
- Alexander Levin (General Producer, May 2001 - January 2002)

== Logo history ==
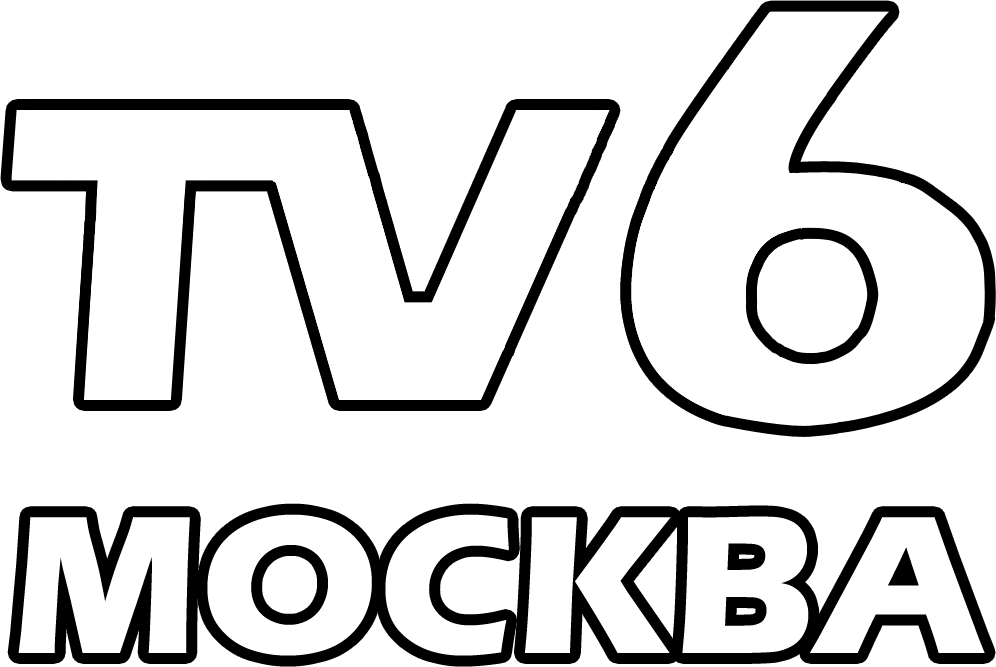
First logo (1993-1995)

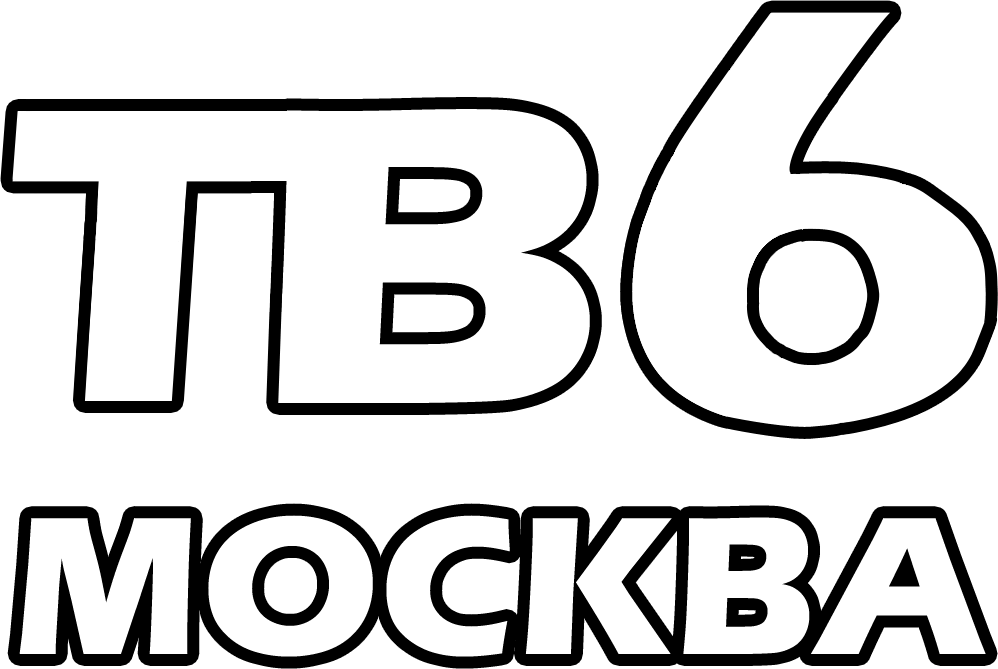
Second logo (1995-1998)

Fourth and final logo (2001-2002)
