= NTV (Russia) =

Russian free-to-air television channel

NTV НТВ
- Country: Russia
- Broadcast area: Russia, CIS, US, and formerly Canada.
- Headquarters: Moscow, Russia

Programming
- Language: Russian
- Picture format: 1080i HDTV (downscaled to 16:9 576i for the SDTV feed)

Ownership
- Owner: Gazprom Media

History
- Launched: 10 October 1993; 32 years ago
- Replaced: 4th channel Ostankino; Russian Universities

Links
- Website: ntv.ru

Availability

Terrestrial
- Digital terrestrial television: Channel 4

NTV (Cyrillic: НТВ) is a Russian free-to-air television channel that was launched as a subsidiary of Vladimir Gusinsky's company Media-Most. Since 14 April 2001 Gazprom Media controls the network. NTV has no official meaning according to Igor Malashenko, the author of the name and co-founder of the company, but in the 1990s unofficial transcripts of the acronym include "New" (Novoe), "Independent" (Nezavisimoe), "Non-governmental" (Negosudarstvennoe), "Our" (Nashe).

== History ==
=== Gusinsky era (1993–2001) ===
Gusinsky founded NTV broadcasting in October 1993 on channel 4. It moved to channel 5 in January 1994. He attracted talented journalists and news anchors of the time such as Tatiana Mitkova, Leonid Parfyonov, Mikhail Osokin, Yevgeniy Kiselyov, Vladimir A. Kara-Murza, Victor Shenderovich, Pyotr Marchenko and others. The channel set high professional standards in Russian television, broadcasting live coverage and sharp analysis of current events. Starting before the dissolution of Soviet Union as Fourth Programme, the channel broadcast a daily news programme Segodnya and a weekly news-commentary programme Itogi which was jointly supported by the United States magazine Newsweek (at the time, a subsidiary of The Washington Post Company, now Graham Holdings Company). In the early 1990s, Video International, a multibillion-dollar advertising agency, obtained exclusive advertising rights on NTV.

It commented favorably on President Boris Yeltsin's re-election campaign in 1996.

By 1999 NTV had achieved an audience of 102 million, covering about 70% of Russia's territory, and was available in other former Soviet republics.

During parliamentary elections in 1999 and presidential elections in 2000, NTV was critical of the Second Chechen War, Vladimir Putin and the political party Unity backed by him. In the puppet show Kukly ('Puppets') in the beginning of February 2000, the puppet of Putin acted as Little Zaches in a story based on E.T.A. Hoffmann's Little Zaches Called Cinnabar, in which blindness causes villagers to mistake an evil gnome for a beautiful youth. This provoked a fierce reaction from Putin's supporters. On 8 February the newspaper Sankt-Peterburgskie Vedomosti published a letter signed by the Rector of St. Petersburg State University Lyudmila Verbitskaya, the Dean of its Law Department Nikolay Kropachyov and some of Putin's other presidential campaign assistants that urged the prosecution of the authors of the show for what they considered a criminal offence.

==== Talk show with people of Ryazan and FSB members ====
On 24 March 2000, two days before the presidential elections, NTV featured the Ryazan apartment bombing of fall 1999 in the talk show Independent Investigation. The interviews of the residents of the Ryazan apartment building, along with FSB public relations director Alexander Zdanovich and Ryazan branch head Alexander Sergeyev was filmed a few days earlier. On 26 March, Boris Nemtsov voiced his concern over the possible shut-down of NTV for airing the talk.

Seven months later, NTV general manager Igor Malashenko said at the JFK School of Government that the Information Minister Mikhail Lesin had warned him on several occasions. Malashenko's recollection of Lesin's warning was that by airing the talk show NTV had "crossed a line" and that the NTV managers were "outlaws" in the eyes of the Kremlin.

According to Alexander Goldfarb, Malashenko told him that Valentin Yumashev had brought a warning from the Kremlin, one day before the airing of the show, promising in no uncertain terms that the NTV managers "should consider themselves finished" if they went ahead with the broadcast.

=== Eviction of management (2000–2001) ===
On 11 May 2000, tax police, backed by officers from the general prosecutor's office and the FSB, stormed the Moscow headquarters of NTV and Media-Most and searched the premises for 12 hours. Critics considered this move politically motivated, as NTV voiced opposition to Putin since his presidential electoral campaign. Putin denied any involvement.

Viktor Shenderovich claimed that an unnamed top government official requested NTV to exclude the puppet of Putin from Kukly. Accordingly, in the following episode of the show, called "Ten Commandments", the puppet of Putin was replaced with a cloud covering the top of a mountain and a burning bush.

The program Itogi went on investigating corruption in the Russian government and the autumn 1999 blasts in Russia.

On 13 June 2000, Gusinsky was detained as a suspect in the General Prosecutor Office's criminal investigation of fraud between his Media-Most holding, Russkoye Video – 11th Channel Ltd. and the federal enterprise Russkoye Video. At the time, Media-Most was involved in a dispute over the loan received from Gazprom. On the third day, however, he was released under the written undertaking not to leave the country.

On 15 July, the puppet of Putin acted in the Kukly show as Girolamo Savonarola.

On 19 July, investigators of the office of the Prosecutor General of Russia came to Gusinsky's home, distrained and arrested his property.

In a surprisingly informal deal, the charges against Gusinsky were lifted after he signed an agreement with Mikhail Lesin, Minister of Media, on 20 July. Under the "shares for freedom" transaction or Protocol No.6 (Протокол N.6. Доля свободы) agreement, Gusinsky would discharge his debts by selling Media-Most to Gazprom-Media, which had held a 30% share of NTV since 1996, for the price imposed by the latter, and was given a guarantee that he would not be prosecuted. After leaving the country, Gusinsky claimed he was pressured to sign the agreement by the prospect of the criminal investigation. Media-Most refused to comply with the agreement.

Tax authorities brought a suit against Media-Most aiming to wind it up.

On 26 January 2001, Gazprom announced that it had acquired a controlling stake of 46% in NTV. The voting rights of a 19% stake held by Media-Most was frozen by a court decision.

Putin met with leading NTV journalists on 29 January, but the meeting changed nothing. The parties reasserted their positions; Putin denied any involvement and said that he could not interfere with the prosecutors and courts.

Around that time American media mogul Ted Turner (owner and founder of the Turner Broadcasting System subsidiary of Time Warner) appeared to be going to buy Gusinsky's share, but this has never happened.

On 3 April, Gazprom Media headed by Alfred Kokh by violating the procedure conducted a shareholders' meeting which removed Kiselyov from the NTV Director General position.

=== Gazprom era (2001–present) ===
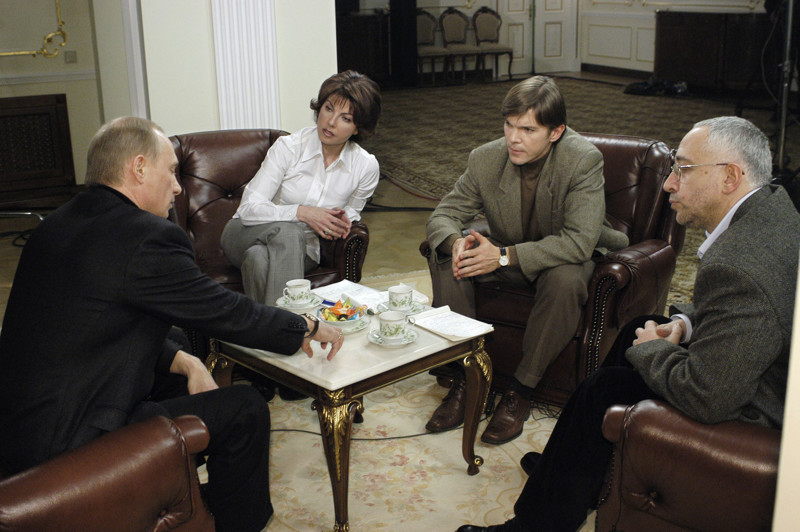
Russian President Putin meets with NTV journalists Tatyana Mitkova, Kirill Kleimyonov and Nikolai Svanidze, 18 November 2004

On 14 April 2001, Gazprom took over NTV by force and brought in its own management team. Its director-general Yevgeniy Kiselyov was replaced by Boris Jordan. Many leading journalists, including Yevgeniy Kiselyov, Svetlana Sorokina, Viktor Shenderovich, Vladimir A. Kara-Murza, Dmitry Dibrov, left the company. Leonid Parfyonov and Tatyana Mitkova remained. Kiselyov's Itogi program was closed down, replaced by Parfyonov's Namedni.

Citizens concerned by the threat to the freedom of speech in Russia argued that the financial pressure was inspired by Vladimir Putin's government, which was often subject to criticism by NTV. Some tens of thousands of Russians rallied to the call of dissident NTV journalists in order to support the old NTV staff in April 2001. Within the next couple of years, two independent TV channels which absorbed the former NTV journalists, TV-6 and TVS, were also shut down.

In January 2003, Boris Jordan was ousted as director general and replaced by Nikolay Senkevich, son of Channel One presenter Yuri Senkevich. A few days earlier he was also discharged from the director-general position of Media-Most, where he had replaced Alfred Kokh in October 2001. Insiders claimed that Jordan was sacked because NTV had carried a live translation of the culmination of the Moscow theater siege in October 2002 and had been too critical of the way authorities handled it.

Since then, entertaining talk shows became more prominent on NTV, rather than political programmes. However, unlike other leading TV channels in Russia, NTV went on reporting on-the-fly about some opposition activities and government failures, including the conflagrating fire of the Moscow Manege on the day of the Russian presidential elections on 14 March 2004, and the assassination of the pro-Russian President of Chechnya Akhmad Kadyrov on Victory Day, 9 May 2004.

On 1 June 2004, Leonid Parfyonov, one of the last leading journalists from the old NTV staff who remained, and who was still critical of the government, was ousted from the channel, and his weekly news commentary programme Namedni was taken off the air. Its last announced episode never aired. Shortly before this, Parfyonov had been forbidden to present an interview with Malika Yandarbieva, widow of Chechen rebel leader Zelimkhan Yandarbiev. Yandarbiev had been assassinated in exile in Qatar earlier that year. Parfyonov had shared this decision with the public on 31 May.

On 5 July 2004, Senkevich was replaced by Vladimir Kulistikov (b. 1952) as director general of NTV. Tamara Gavrilova, formerly a fellow student with Vladimir Putin at Leningrad State University, was appointed deputy director general.

Soon the political programmes Freedom of Speech hosted by Savik Shuster (Shuster works in Ukraine since 2005), Personal Contribution hosted by Aleksandr Gerasimov, and Red Arrow were closed down.

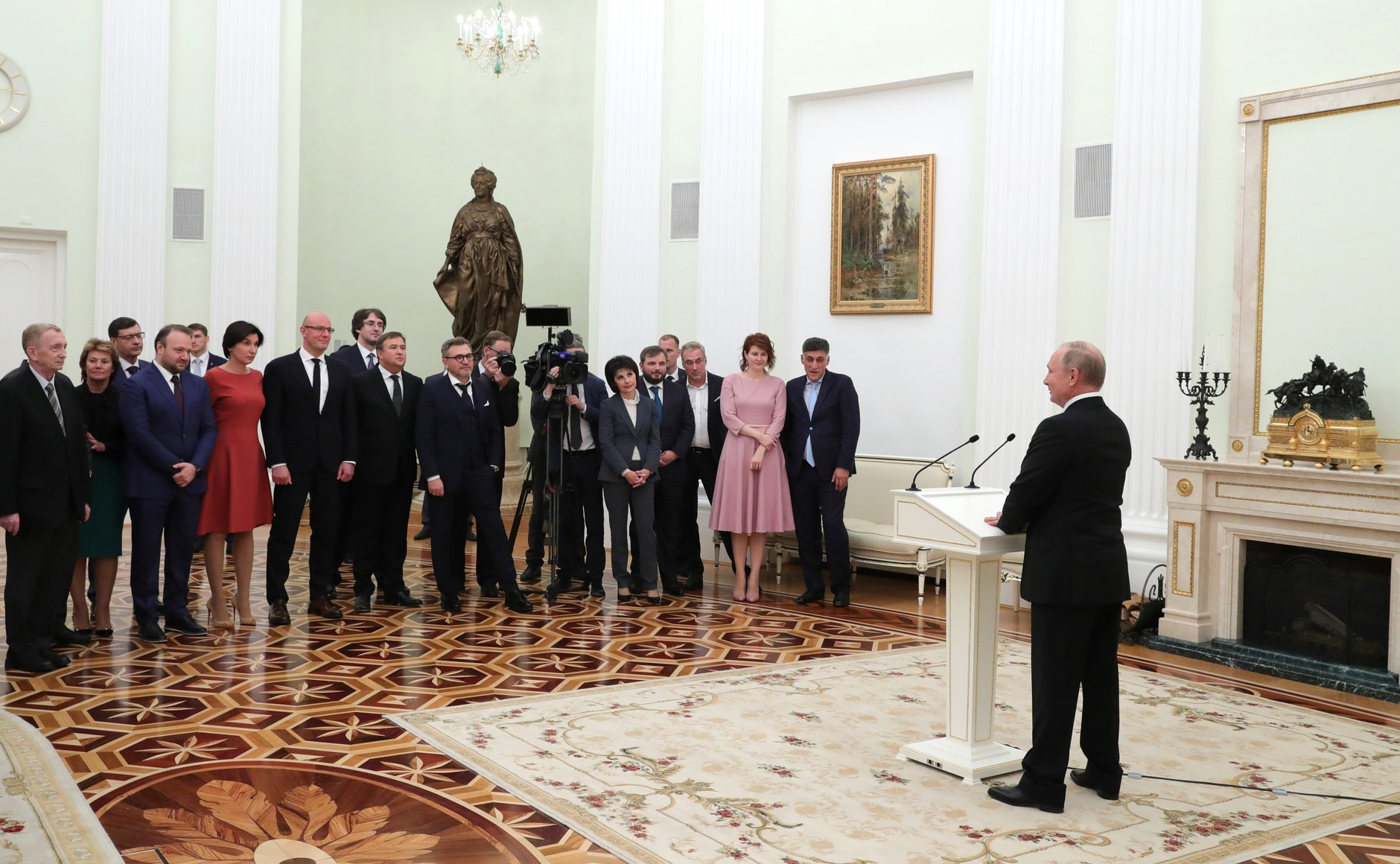
Russian President Vladimir Putin meets with NTV executives and journalists, 12 October 2018

From 2006 to 2009, NTV ran the weekly news commentary programme Sunday Night in a talk-show format and the political talk-show On The Stand, both hosted by Vladimir Solovyov, as well as weekly news commentary programme Real Politics hosted on Saturdays from 2005 to 2008 by political analyst and key Kremlin adviser Gleb Pavlovsky.

NTV began to be broadcast in widescreen in April 2013, hosted its own coverage of the 2014 Winter Olympics in Sochi, and joined the long list of Russian TV networks broadcasting in HD on 9 February 2015.

==== Controversy over Ukraine ====
In August 2014, NTV aired a documentary titled 13 Friends of the Junta, which described critics of Russia's policies in Ukraine as "traitors" and supporters of "fascists". The Moscow Times reported that footage of Andrey Makarevich's concert in Sviatohirsk "was merged with images of the fighting that he supposedly endorsed. The program never mentions that the concert was for the benefit of Ukraine's internally displaced children." In 2015, NTV fired a journalist who criticized Vladimir Putin and his policy towards Ukraine.

Another program "Anatomy of a protest" also presented most of the anti-government protesters in former USSR countries as "Western puppets" or CIA-inspired agents. The producers of the program, Pyotr Drogovoz and Liliya Parfyonova, were also accused of frequently receiving wiretap information from the FSB which allowed them to pay surprise visits with cameras rolling on various opposition meetings.

Shortly after the Crocus City Hall attack, for which the Islamic State – Khorasan Province claimed responsibility, NTV broadcast a doctored video using audio deepfaking, purporting to show Oleksiy Danilov, the Secretary of the National Security and Defense Council of Ukraine, confirming Ukrainian involvement in the attack, supposedly saying, "It's fun in Moscow today, I think it's very fun. I would like to believe that we will arrange such fun for them more often." The deepfake was created by patching together previous news streams of the Ukrainian 1+1 channel.

==== Sanctions over Ukraine ====
In 2022, the Denis Diderot Committee, a European group of academic researchers and professionals called for sanctions against NTV Plus for having cancelled various international news channels from its line-up.

On 8 May 2022, the Office of Foreign Assets Control of the United States Department of the Treasury placed sanctions on NTV Broadcasting Company pursuant to Executive Order 14024 for being owned or controlled by, or for having acted or purported to act for or on behalf of, directly or indirectly, the Government of Russia.

== Programmes ==
=== Past ===
- Kukly
- Freedom of Speech, host Savik Shuster
- Personal Contribution, host Aleksandr Gerasimov
- Red Arrow
- Sunday Night, host Vladimir Solovyov
- On The Stand, host Solovyov
- Real Politics, host Gleb Pavlovsky

=== Present ===
- Time will tell, host Ivan Trushkin
- Mesto Vstrechi, hosts Andrey Vladimirovich Norkin, Trushkin

== Criticism ==
=== The "criminal" component of the broadcast network ===
Under NTV CEO Vladimir Kulistikov, according to journalist Rostislav Zhuravlev, up to 70% of the channel's broadcast network consisted of crime series, crime programs and emergency reports, which is why NTV was popularly nicknamed "MENTTV"; сA similar opinion was expressed by the former presenter of the channel, Vladimir Kara-Murza Sr., although, according to him, there was similar shocking content on other Russian TV channels. The vast majority of the broadcast television series were of questionable quality, according to Artyom Gusyatinsky, directors sometimes did not hesitate to "steal" plot moves from other films and TV series produced abroad. In 2010, RIA Novosti columnist Sergey Varshavchik claimed that the TV channel was working "for its audience" — mostly men with low educational levels, who usually served time or worked in non-senior positions in law enforcement agencies.

In 2010, an online publication Lenta.ru He noted that if tens of thousands of Muscovites protested against such actions in 2001 during the change of ownership of the TV channel, then in 9 years viewers began to "spit on Parfenov, on NTV, and on themselves," therefore, in the event of a hypothetical closure of NTV, they would be outraged these days. This is only seen by fans of crime series like "Capercaillie". Satirical writer Mikhail Zadornov also commented ironically on the content of the channel's network: at his concerts and on his blogs, he joked that "95% of crimes in Russia are solved only in NTV series."

The abandonment of the "criminal" component of the NTV broadcast network began in 2015, when Alexey Zemsky took over the position of CEO. According to Lenta.ru By that time, the TV channel, as "the main supplier of action-packed series about the struggle of policemen and bandits, had lost both revenue and viewers," dropping to 4th place in the rating of the most popular channels. Most of the new network began to be occupied by beauty and health programs, as well as talk shows with the participation of stars: "The Stars came together" and "Million Dollar Secret". According to Timur Weinstein, the lack of own financial resources does not allow to radically change the concept of the channel.

=== Anonymous documentaries ===
Since September 2004, as part of the documentary series Emergency. Investigation and several other similar programs featured a number of documentary mini-films of a propaganda and accusatory nature without prior mention in the print programs of the programs. In the first three years, such films appeared most often on NTV, rather than on state channels. Almost all of them talked about events and people negatively perceived by the modern Russian government: the case of Yukos and Mikhail Khodorkovsky ("Terrorist attack with prepayment", "The Man With the Broom", "The Yukos Brigade", "Murder as a Gift"), Mikheil Saakashvili ("Миша"), Boris Berezovsky, Viktor Yushchenko, the Russian political opposition ("Who is Ordering Chaos?", "The Wrong Thing", "Anatomy of Protest", "Pathology of Protest", "Radio Unfreedom", "Kasyan's Day"), Alexander Lukashenko ("Крёстный батька"), Евромайдан ("Maidan Technologies").

Almost all the films were characterized by a sharp falsification of facts and the groundlessness of ideas expressed. Most of these films, except for the very first ones, were released without listing the crew or attribution. They were criticized by the audience, the public and former NTV employees. In 2010, a protest action was held against NTV in Belarus, the reason for which was the documentary The Godfather, shown on July 4 of that year and criticizing the activities of Alexander Lukashenko. Commenting on the 2018 NTV 25+ documentary dedicated to the anniversary of NTV, former TV channel presenter Vladimir Kara-Murza Sr. criticized the presentation of information, saying that after 2001, none of the new "bright, talented people" appeared on NTV, and called anonymous documentaries "fraud, leaks, and fakes".

=== Coverage of events in Ukraine in 2014 ===
Since the start of Euromaidan in 2013, the channel has repeatedly been the target of criticism from other media outlets and in the blogosphere. NTV was accused of distorting events and participating in an anti-Ukrainian propaganda campaign conducted by the Russian authorities, as well as of poor editorial quality, which more than once led to obvious blunders and scandals. ТSo, in April 2014, an NTV news report from one of the hospitals in the city of Mykolaiv became widely known, in which a man lying in a hospital bed, identified as Andrei Petkhov, was shown as a "mercenary", a citizen of Germany and "several other countries", who brought 500 thousand euros for the "Right Sector" and was preparing a group out of fifty citizens of Western Europe joined the military actions. As it turned out later, the day before the NTV report, the same man appeared in a report by Independent Sevastopol Television as "a resident of Germany, a pediatric surgeon who saved more than two hundred babies," who "came to support fellow countrymen in the fight against advancing neo-Nazism," and on the day of the NTV report, the same man was featured in the news on the TV channel "Russia-1" as a peaceful anti-Maidan supporter who was seriously injured during the dispersal of a peaceful rally. The BBC Russian Service received a response to its request from the police of the city of Mykolaiv that the hero of the report is actually a citizen of Ukraine. Later, NTV reported that the hero of the report has schizophrenia, and reproached the Western media for trying to convict him of staging, and Andrei Ivanov, the editor-in-chief of the State of Emergency program, blamed the "conditions of the revolution", in which verifying the facts stated by the interviewee is difficult. Forbes columnist Arina Borodina cited this case as an example of the "amazing story of the propaganda campaign" against Ukraine.

During the spring and autumn of 2014, NTV aired films of a revealing nature without attribution under the title Profession — reporter, in which official Ukrainian authorities and public figures were attacked ("The Princess at the Parasha", "The Secret Life of Vitali Klitschko") or media people from Russia who support Ukraine ("13 друзей хунты", "17 More Friends of the Junta"). In light of the screening of such films, TV critic Irina Petrovskaya noted that "the genre of political denunciation has flourished on TV."». In November 2014, the attention of social media was attracted by an NTV report about a drugged teenager from Krasny Liman named Stas, who was allegedly abducted from his home by soldiers of the Ukrainian National Guard, threatening his parents with firearms, and whom the NTV report called a "living target for missiles." Internet users found out that the NTV report showed Stanislav Petrov, a 12-year-old resident of Krasny Liman, who has intellectual disability and a "tendency to vagrancy." Bloggers accused the TV channel of deliberately exploiting the alleged mental disability of a teenager.

=== Invitation of a TV presenter from Ukraine ===
In the spring of 2015, a negative reaction from Russian viewers was caused by the appearance on the morning TV show "Coffee with Milk" of Ukrainian TV presenter Daniil Grachev, known for supporting Euromaidan. In his defense, Grachev said that his support for Euromaidan was due to a banal insult, but over the course of the year he revised his attitude to the Ukrainian events.

== Visual identity ==
The logo design has remained relatively the same since January 1994, with the НТВ typograph and a ball below the "T".

=== Logo history ===
Its first logo in 1993 featured a simple НТВ typograph, but this was replaced with another logo on 17 January 1994, featuring the НТВ typograph with a ball. This would be the template for the succeeding 5 logos. During April 1994, the logo featured a white outline, though still retaining the НТВ typograph, and the ball has a gradient. However, in September 1994, this was replaced with a black-and-white striped outlined logo, with the ball touching the letters.

Over time, the ball would become larger, but since 2001, the ball is smaller. The 1997 logo featured an entirely black and thicker outline, and the ball has a glass feel. In 2001, a similar logo was launched, but with a blue outline and a smaller ball. On 4 June 2007, a new logo was launched, featuring the 2001 logo, but entirely white (except the ball) inside a green box. Logos similar to the current logo, with a larger typograph, are used in idents and promos. In 2010, a variant of the 2007 logo was introduced, but without the green box. It is commonly used as the on-screen bug, changing between it and the green box logo.

The colorful "NTV" logo as well as the iconic green sphere were designed by Simon Levin, the Russian designer, and became a symbol for the new graphic language of television design in Russia.

=== On-screen bug ===
When it first launched on 10 October 1993, the logo was in the lower right corner. However, on 1 December that same year, the logo moved to the lower left.

10 October 1993 – 16 January 1994

17 January – 10 April 1994

11 April – 31 August 1994

1 September 1994 – 10 August 1997

11 August 1997 – 9 September 2001

10 September 2001 – 3 June 2007

4 June 2007 – present

== See also ==
- Media freedom in Russia
- Propaganda in Russia
- NTV Canada
