= Dagestan Museum of Fine Arts =

Art museum in Dagestan, Russia

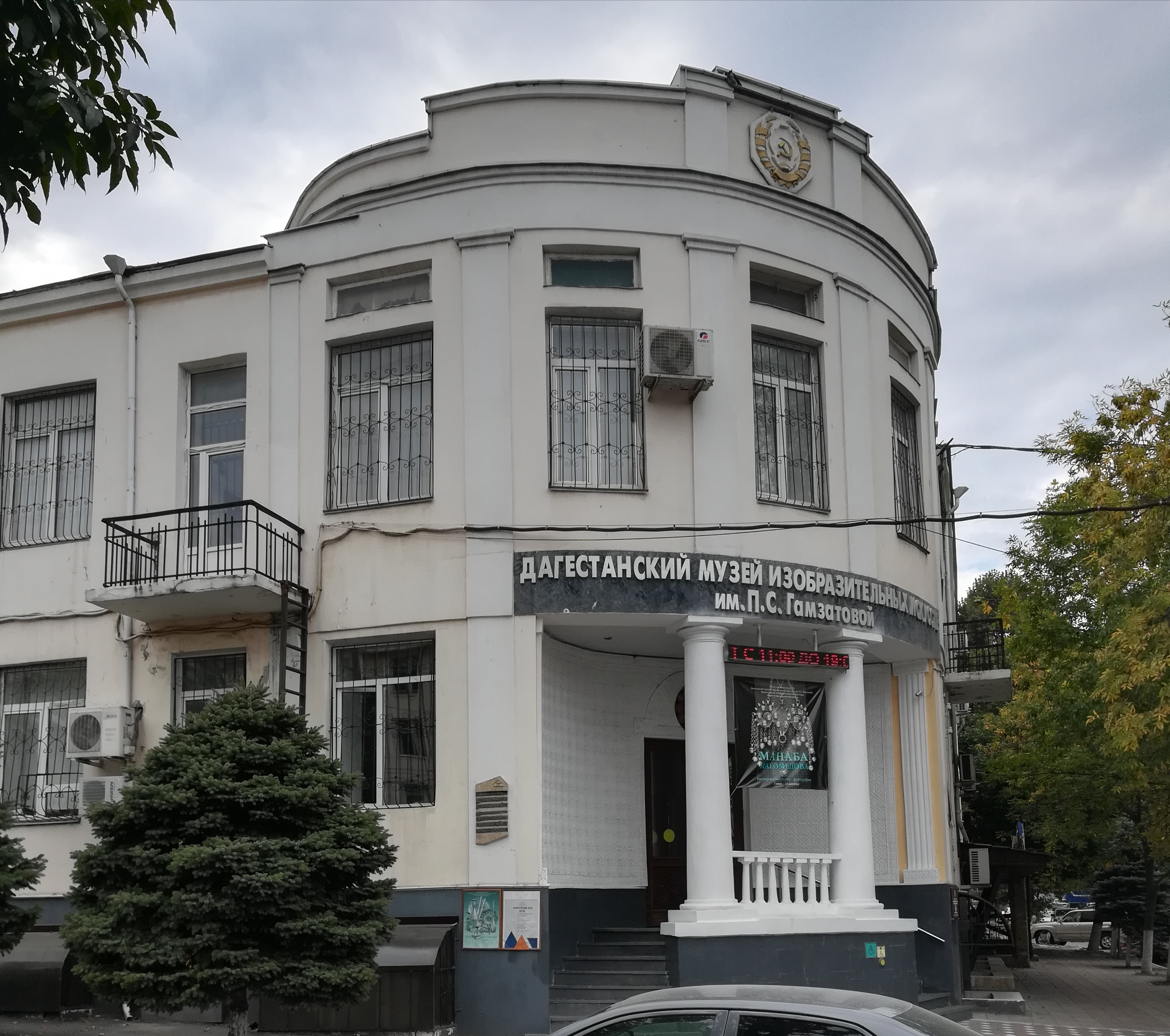
- Interactive fullscreen map
- Established: 1958; 68 years ago
- Location: 8 Gorky Street, Makhachkala, Dagestan, Russia.
- Coordinates: 42°58′56″N 47°30′39″E
- Type: Art museum
- Directors: Gamzatova, Salihat Rasulovna

The Dagestan Museum of Fine Arts named after P. S. Gamzatova is a cultural institution, located at Gorky Street, Building 8, in the city of Makhachkala in the Republic of Dagestan, in the North Caucasus of Russia.

== Exposition ==
The 10 halls of the museum's permanent exhibition display work by Dagestani and foreign masters - painting, graphics, sculpture, ceramics, wood carving, copper, carpets, furniture, glass, porcelain, faience from the 2nd millennium BC to the present day.

The museum's collection includes paintings by V. K. Shebuyev ("Old beggar"), I. K. Aivazovsky ("Tempest by Cape Aya", "Seascape"), I. N. Kramskoi ("Portrait of a sister"), F. S. Zhuravlev ("Old Man"), K. V. Lemokh ("Peasant Yard"), K. Y. Makovsky ("Portrait of a Boy"), V. I. Surikov's study for the painting "Boyaryna Morozova", I. I. Levitan ("Corniche. South of France"), V. D. Polenov ("Oka River"), K. A. Korovin ("Samarkand"), A. Ya. Golovin ("Spanish Woman"), V. M. Vasnetsov ("Gamaun, The Prophetic Bird").

In the section "Dagestan in the Works of Russian Artists" in addition to paintings by F. A. Roubaud, an album of lithographs by G. G. Gagarin, there are romantic landscapes by N. G. Chernetsov ("Caucasian Landscape"), I. K. Aivazovsky ("Roads of Mljet to Gudauri"), I. Zankovsky ("A Moonlit Night", "Saltinskaya Tesnina", "Mountain Landscape"), A. Shamshinov ("Karadag"), I. F. Aleksandrovsky ("Mountain Landscape"), sculpture by E. A. Lanceray ("Trick riding").

The museum's collection includes Russian graphics: M. A. Vrubel "Ismail Bey" and "Prisoner", a sketch by I. E. Repin "In the Tea House", watercolor by V. A. Serov "Horse Warrior", landscapes by A. N. Benois; works by artists of the Soviet period, mainly Dagestani, such as Kh.-B. Askar-Sarydzha, E. M. Puterbrot, S. M. Salavatov, N. A. Lakov, K. F. Vlasova, A. Z. Khadzhaev, Yu. M. Khanmagomedov, Sh. Shakhmardanov, G. N. Konopatskaya, A. I. Avgustovich, M.-A. Dzhemal, Yu. A. Mollaev, D. A. Kapanitsyn, M. K. Yunusilau, M. Shabanov, the Sungurov brothers, H. Kurbanov, O. Guseinov, O. Efimov, A. Emirbekov, G. Kambulatov, B. Evseev, Yu. Nikolaev, G. Pshenitsyna, A. I. Markovskaya, V. N. Gorkov, G. Iranpur, Dagestani sculptors – A. M. Yagudayev, T. N. Musakhanova, A. I. Gazaliev, the first Dagestani female sculptor B. A. Muradova.

The museum periodically hosts thematic exhibitions, meetings, lectures, etc.

== History ==
It was created in 1958 by order of the Ministry of Culture of the RSFSR based on the Art Gallery of the National Museum of the Republic of Dagestan. The museum was given the former administrative building, on Lenin Street, where Lenin Square is located.

The collection of the art museum, formed in the 1920s personally by the outstanding Dagestani state and public figure A. Takho-Godi from the storerooms of the state museum funds of Moscow and Petrograd, included works of Western European art of the 16th-19th centuries, Russian art of the 19th-early 20th centuries, including almost the complete collection of Prince A. I. Baryatinsky, several original works by T. Horschelt. From the Caucasian Military History Museum "Temple of Glory" in Tbilisi came the paintings "Siege of Akhoulgo", "Storming the village of Gimry" by F. A. Roubaud, "Shamil" by N. Y. Sverchkov , "The crossing of the river by the highlanders" by F.I. Baikov and other works.

Dmitry I. Pavlov, director of the National Museum of the Republic of Dagestan, donated to the museum an album of drawings by G. G. Gagarin and 18 lithographs depicting scenes from the life of Shamil and his family.

In 1964, Patimat Saidovna Gamzatova was appointed director of the museum, who led the museum continuously until 2000 and did a lot for its development.

In 2000, by the decision of the Government of the Republic of Dagestan, the museum was named after Patimat Saidovna Gamzatova.

== Literature ==
- "History of the formation and acquisition of the collection of the Dagestan Museum of Fine Arts". Collection of scientific articles: history, research, experience, discoveries. Issue 1. /Dagestan Museum of Fine Arts. Makhachkala 2002. pp. 5-27.

== Gallery ==
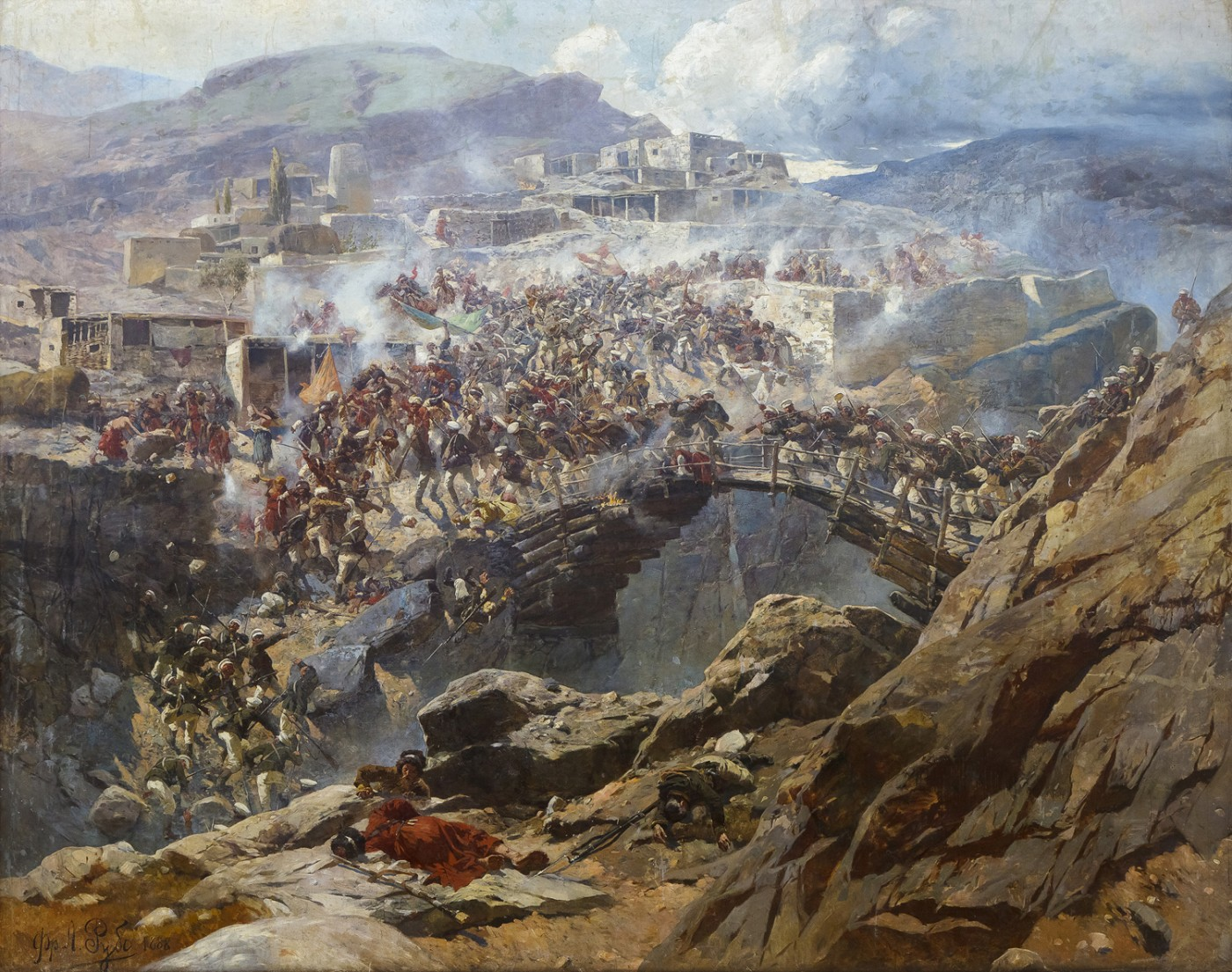
Franz Roubaud, "Siege of Akhoulgo" (1888)

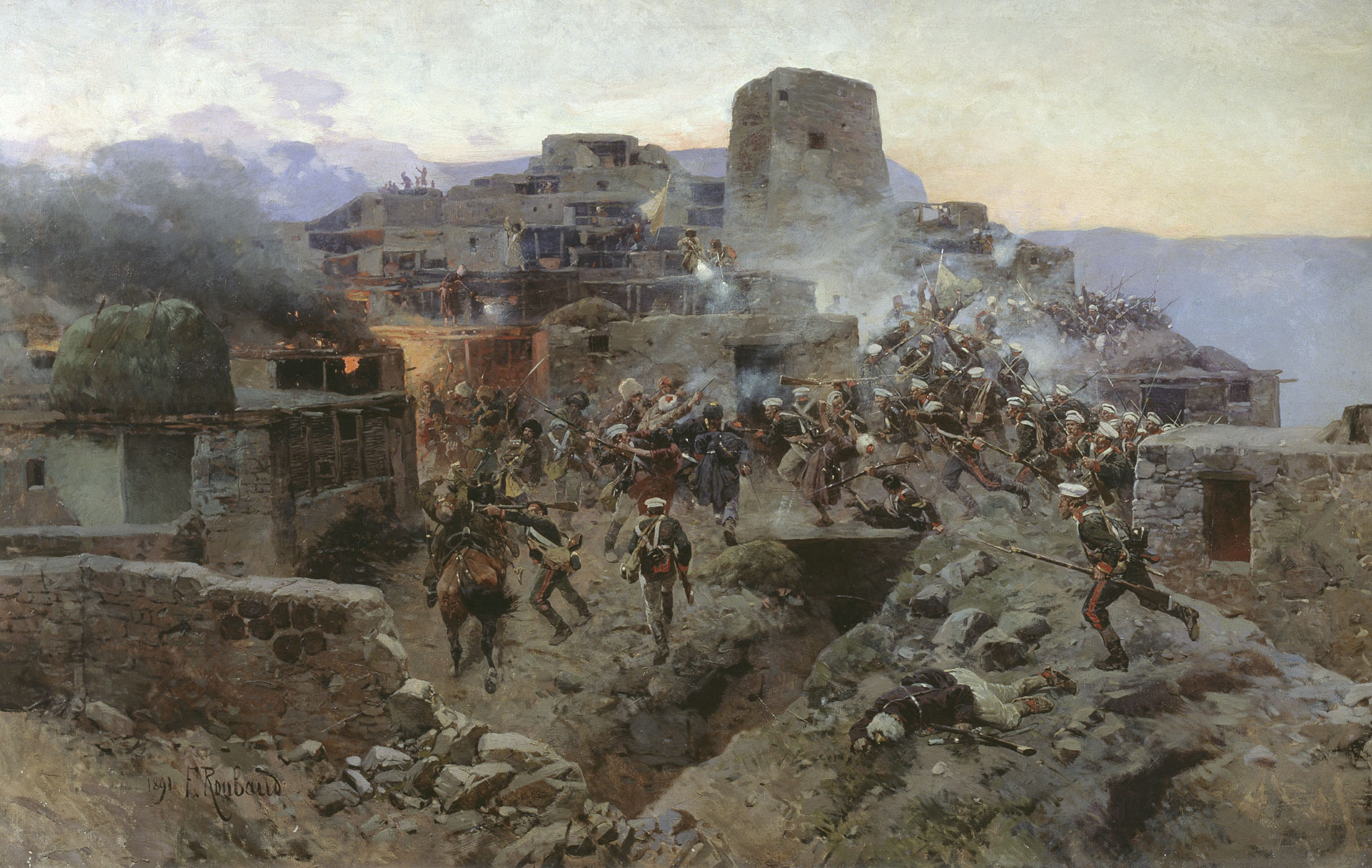
Franz Roubaud, "Storming the village of Gimry", (1891)

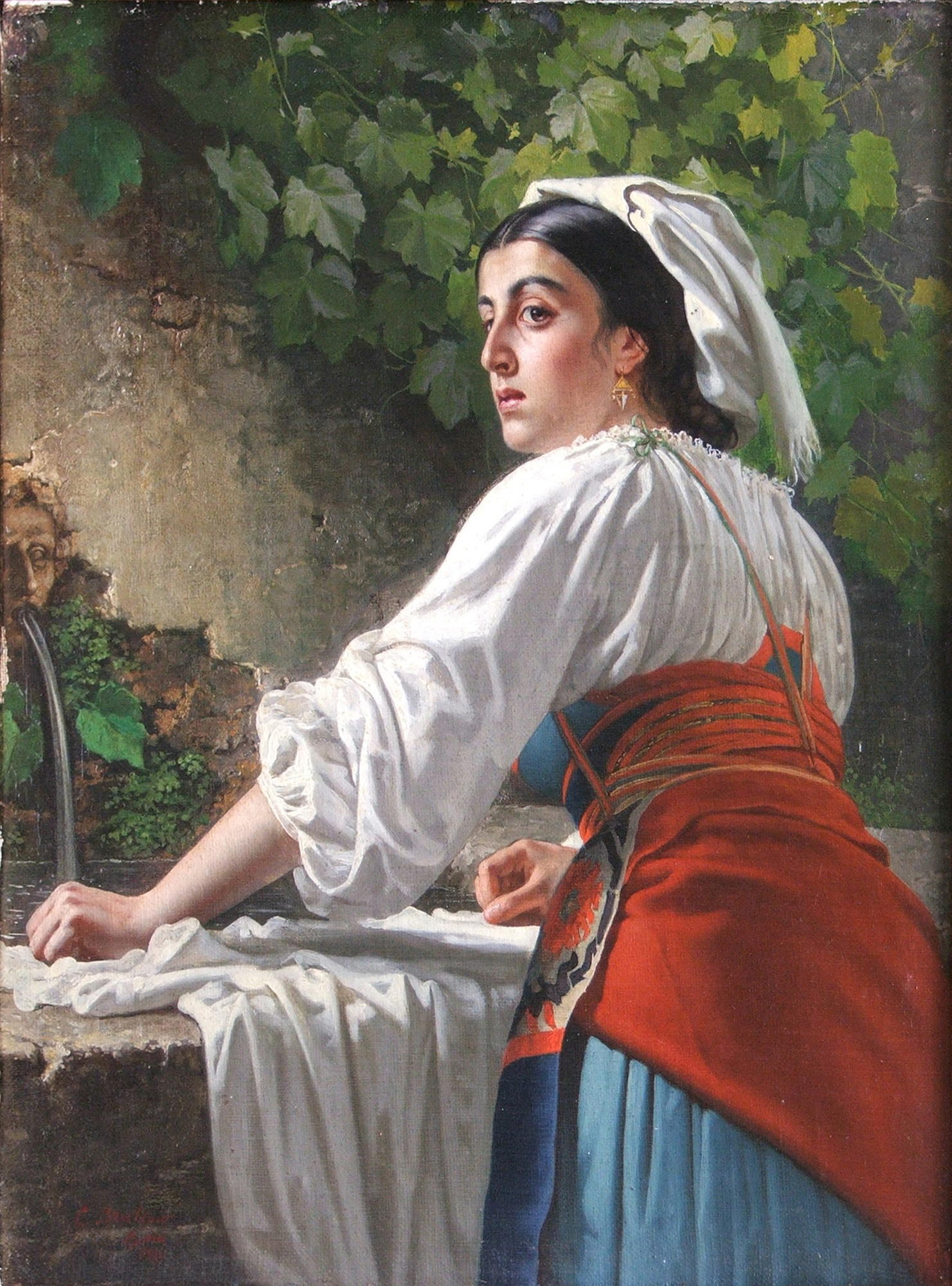
Karl Bryullov, "Italian woman by the pool", (1844)

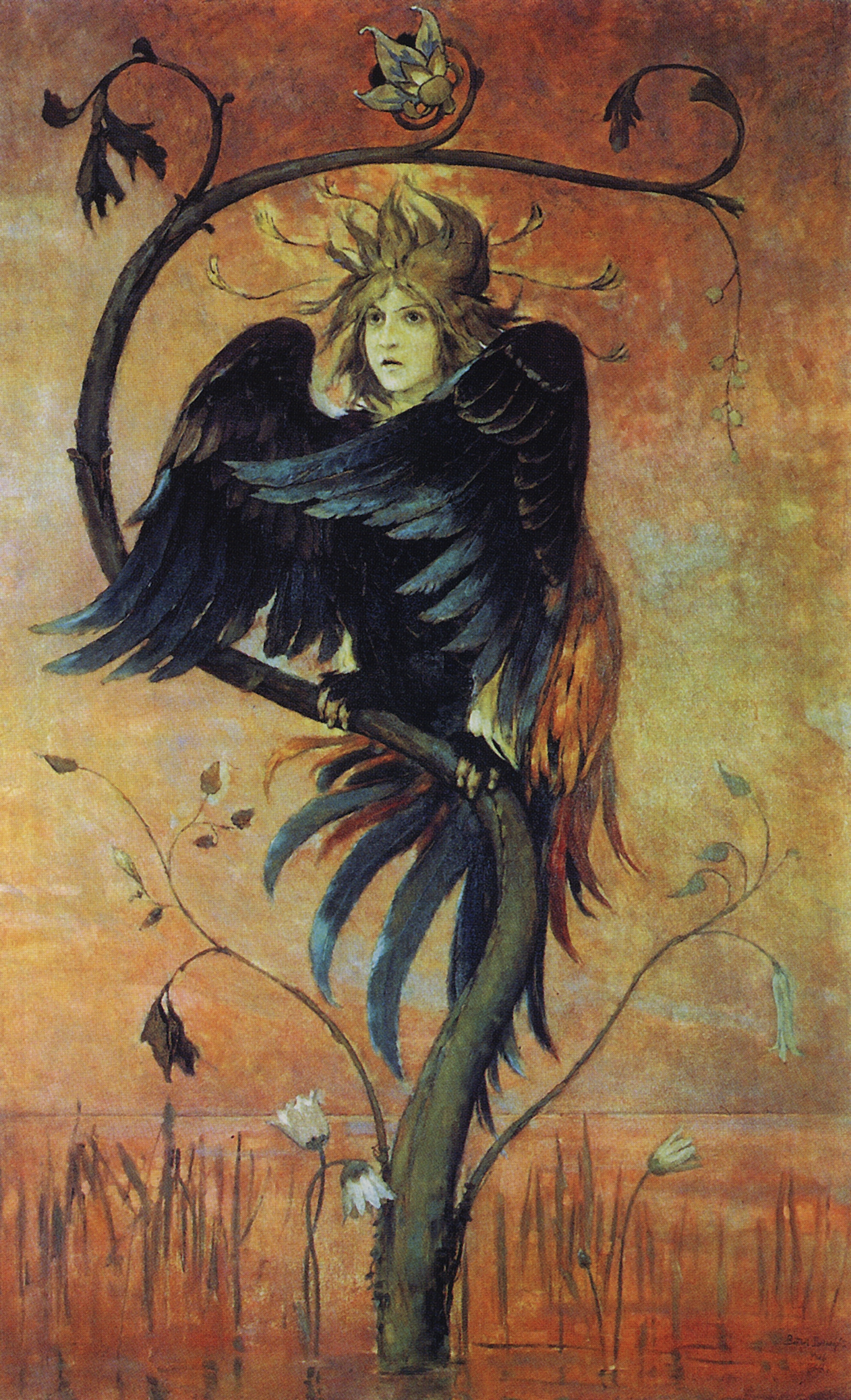
Viktor Vasnetsov, "Gamaun, The Prophetic Bird". (1897)

== See also ==
- National Museum of the Republic of Dagestan
