= Eduard Akuvaev =

Russian painter (1945–2015)

Eduard Izmailovich Akuvaev
- Эдуард Измайлович Акуваев
- Born: 25 February 1945; Makhachkala, Dagestan ASSR, Russian SFSR, Soviet Union
- Died: 24 April 2015 (aged 70); Netanya, Israel
- Citizenship: Russian, Israeli
- Known for: Painting

Eduard Izmailovich Akuvaev (Russian: Эдуард Измайлович Акуваев; Hebrew: אדוארד אקובאייב; 25 February 1945 – 24 April 2015) was a Soviet/Russian–Israeli artist and teacher of Mountain Jew descent. He was awarded titles of the Honored Art Worker of Dagestan, Honored Artist of Dagestan. He was awarded the Khalilbek Musaev award. Several of his works are in the National Museum of the Republic of Dagestan in Makhachkala, the Dagestan Museum of Fine Arts and the Derbent State Museum-Reserve.

== Biography ==
Akuvaev was born in Makhachkala to a family of intellectuals. Akuvaev's serious attraction to art began at the Dagestan Art School, where he entered after the eighth grade of a comprehensive school.

After graduation, he was sent to study at The Moscow Surikov State Academic Institute of Fine Arts in Moscow.

He often visited Tretyakov Gallery to learn from the Old Masters. Akuvaev was influenced by Anthony van Dyck, Diego Velázquez, Ivan Kramskoi, Vincent van Gogh, and Pierre-Auguste Renoir.

After completing his studies, Akuvaev returned to Makhachkala, to teach in the school. In 1973, he was invited to work at the Dagestan Pedagogical Institute at the Faculty of Graphic Arts. He worked as a senior instructor and assistant professor of the Department of Painting.

As a teacher, Akuvaev combined teaching with creative activity. He painted "Still life with reproduction of Chardin" (Russian: Натюрморт с репродукцией Шардена). The attributes for his painting, Akuvaev used old things of his grandmother; a copper basin, a rug, and a Sulevkent's jug. These antiques connected the artist with Chardin, whom Akuvaev loved and revered very much. The painting was exhibited at the "South Zone" exhibition, and then it was bought by the Dagestan Museum of Fine Arts, where the painting is to this day.

In the 1970s, the artist took part in many exhibitions. Thus, the painting "Portrait of Grandmother" (Russian: Портрет бабушки) was exhibited at the 5th All-Russian Exhibition in Moscow in 1975.

In 1977, Akuvaev was admitted to the Union of Artists of the USSR.

A. Taho-Godi National Museum of Dagestan in Makhachkala and the Imam Shamil Fund commissioned Akuvaev to paint portraits of imam Ghazi Muhammad and Avar leader Hadji Murad. In 1992, the artist completed both portraits that are now located at Taho-Godi National Museum of Dagestan. Akuvaev painted Hadji Murad from the drawing of Grigory Gagarin and named it "Hadji Murad Against the Background of the Village of Khunzakh" (Russian: Хаджи-Мурат на фоне села Хунзах). Both portraits are based on historical figures.

Akuvaev worked in Dagestan with a large publishing house "Daguchpedgiz". In 1985, he illustrated books for the story "The Dawns Here Are Quiet..." (Russian: А зори здесь тихие...) by Boris Vasilyev and for the novel "Dick Sand, A Captain at Fifteen" by Jules Verne.

Akuvaev worked more than 20 years at the graphic arts department of the Dagestan Pedagogical Institute, but art occupied a significant place in his life.

In 1995, Akuvaev immigrated to Israel with his family.

He took part in many group exhibitions, including "Artists from Netanya" (1996), "Artists from the Caucasus for the 40th Anniversary of Upper Nazareth" (1998), "Artists from the Caucasus in Netanya" (1999), “Artists from the Caucasus in Merkaz ha-music” (Tel Aviv, 2000) and "Artists from the Caucasus in the Jerusalem Museum" (2001).

In Israel, the artist's work was popular. The style and technique of the painter did not change throughout the artist's career, and this satisfied the customers.

In Israel, he was a member of the Israel Artists' Union.

The works of Eduard Akuvaev are kept in the Dagestan Art Fund, in museums, private collections in Russia, Israel and USA.

== Awards ==
- Honored Artist of Dagestan
- Honored Art Worker of Dagestan
- Khalilbek Musaev award
