= Tamara Musakhanov =

Soviet and Israeli sculptor (1924–2014)

Tamara Nahamievna Musakhanova Тамара Нахамиевна Мусаханова
- Born: January 31, 1924; Derbent, Dagestan, USSR
- Died: February 27, 2014 (aged 90); Haifa, Israel
- Known for: sculpture and ceramic
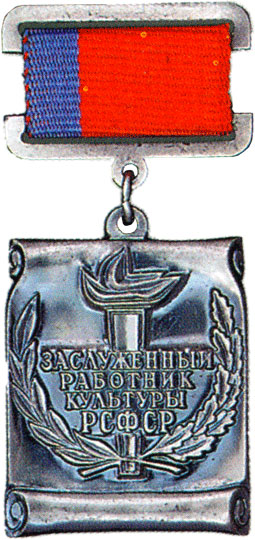
- Awards

Tamara Nahamievna Musakhanova (Russian: Тамара Нахамиевна Мусаханова; Hebrew: תמרה מסכנוב; born January 31, 1924 — February 27, 2014) was a Soviet sculptor, and ceramist of Mountain Jewish origin. Member of Union of Artists in the former Soviet Union and in Israel. She was also an Honored Artist of Dagestan.

== Biography ==
Tamara Musakhanova managed to finish several art schools in different cities. She began her education at the pedagogical school in Makhachkala where she met her husband, Abram Vladimirovich Fridberg. She then continued her education at the Moscow Kalinin School of industrial art, which she graduated in 1949. She worked in the media of sculpture, painting, and crafts in ceramics and faience before continuing her art education in Alma-Ata.

Scenes of her works represented simple values in life – national traditions in work and leisure, clothing and holidays.

Musakhanova was awarded the Medal of the Ministry of Culture and the Union of Artists of the Russian Federation. She had certificates and diplomas for participation in the Republican art exhibitions and achievements in the development of Soviet arts and crafts. Many of her works are in the collections of 15 Russian art museums, including the Tretyakov Gallery, Dagestan Museum of Fine Arts, the State Museum of Oriental Art, the museum-estate Kuskovo, as well as in private collections in Russia, Israel, Germany, England and America.

Since 1990, Musakhanova lived in Israel in Haifa, where she actively participated in the following exhibitions: a group exhibition of repatriates "Omanut ole" (1994), a group show in the gallery "Tsafon" (1998), a solo exhibit in Haifa (1998), an exhibition of artists from the Caucasus in Netanya (1999), artists of the Caucasus in Merkaz ha-music Tel Aviv-Yafo (2000), etc.

In an interview with Israeli journalist Hana Rafail, Musakhanova said:

"…My last solo exhibition was held in Moscow in 1990, it was held for a month. The Tretyakov Gallery and the Russian Art Fund acquired for themselves the best of my work. And the year before that, in 1989, I received a mandate invitation to participate in the World Jewish Congress in Moscow..."

Musakhanova's husband, Abram Fridberg, was an "Honored Artist of Russia". He died in Israel.

Tamara Musakhanova and Abram Fridberg had two children, Michael Fridberg and Love Mataeva.

Musakhanova's brother, Albert Nahamievych Musakhanova, held a doctorate degree in agricultural science and lived in the suburbs of Moscow. Sister Asya Nahamievna Musakhanova, graduated from the university in the Faculty of Philology, she worked at the Makhachkala Pedagogical Institute.

Tamara Musakhanova died in 2014. She is buried in the city of Haifa, Israel.

== Awards ==
- Honored Cultural Worker of the RSFSR.
- Honoured Art Worker of Dagestanian Autonomous Soviet Socialist Republic.
- Honoured Artist of Dagestan.

== Legacy ==
In December 2017, posthumously, in the Dagestan Museum of Fine Arts in Makhachkala opened a joint retrospective exhibition with the Museum of the History of World Cultures and Religions dedicated to the life and work of the famous Dagestani sculptor and ceramist Tamara Musakhanova.

This was the second solo exhibition in memory of Tamara Musakhanova. The first was held in her hometown of Derbent.
