= Eduard Puterbrot =

Russian painter (1940–1993)

Eduard Moiseevich Puterbrot (Эдуард Моисеевич Путерброт)
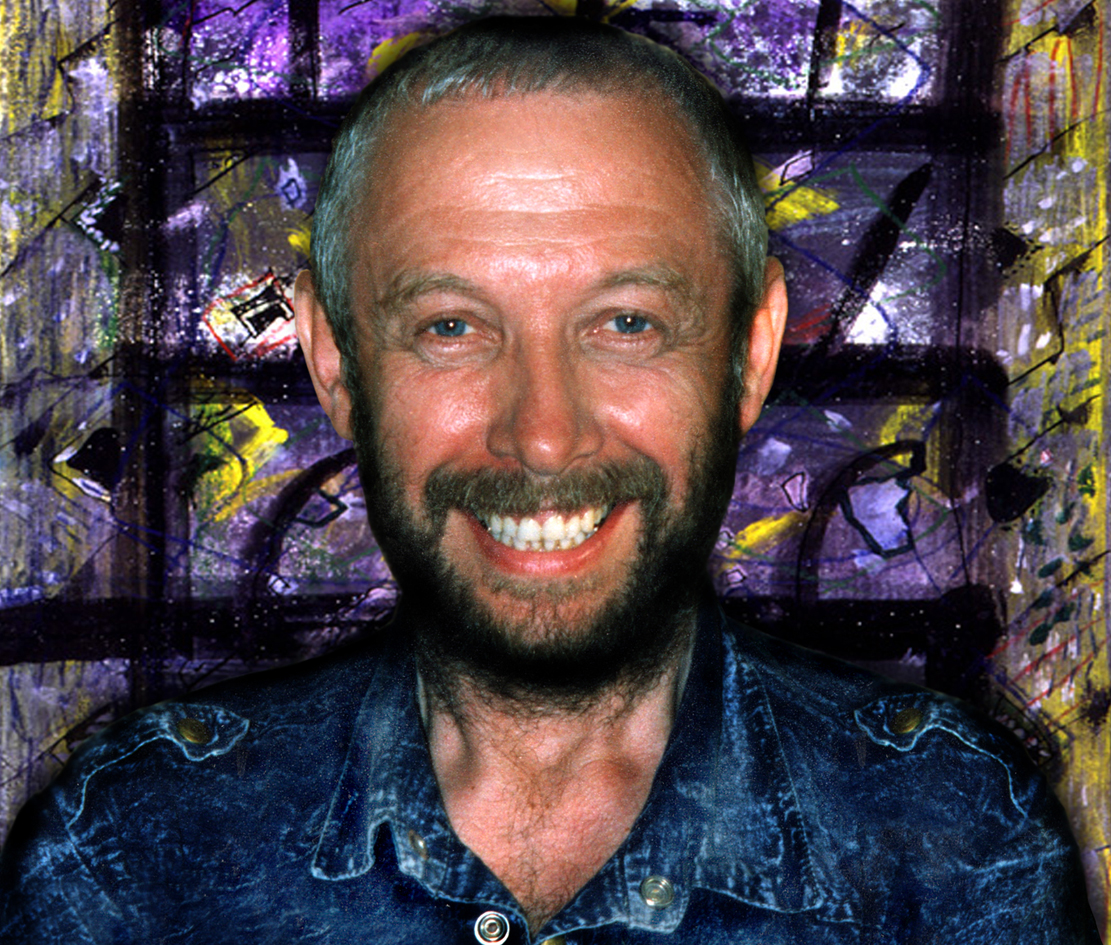
- Born: Eduard Moiseevich Puterbrot, (Эдуард Моисеевич Путерброт); September 12, 1940; Makhachkala, Dagestan
- Died: 15 November 1993 (aged 53); Makhachkala, Dagestan
- Education: Dagestan State University, Makhachkala
- Known for: Painting, Art
- Movement: symbolism
- Website: http://puterbrot.com/

Eduard Moiseevich Puterbrot (September 12, 1940, Makhachkala – November 15, 1993, Makhachkala) – a Russian artist, member of Artists' Union of USSR, laureate of Republic Prize of Dagestanian Autonomous Soviet Socialist Republic named after Gamzat Tsadasa for the paintings Master and Village concert as well as sketches of decorations to Medea by Euripides and Chest of disasters by Gamzat Tsadasa, Honoured Art Worker of Dagestanian Autonomous Soviet Socialist Republic.

Puterbrot is considered one of the developers of new style of painting in Soviet Art, characterized, inter alia, as symbolism.

Puterbrot participated in Exhibitions in USSR, Germany (Blankenheim, Oldenburg), France, Hungary, Poland and Latvia.

Puterbrot's works can be found in:

- Central theatre museum named after A.A.Bahrushin, Moscow
- State Tretyakov Gallery, Moscow
- Dagestan Museum of Fine Arts, Makhachkala
- National Museum of the Republic of Dagestan named after Alibek Takho-Godi, Makhachkala
- Directorate of Art Exhibitions of USSR
- Art Collection of Russian Soviet Federal Socialist Republic, Moscow
- Center of Stas Namin
- Corporate and private collections in Russia, Germany, France, Spain, Austria, Italy, USA.

== Short creative biography ==
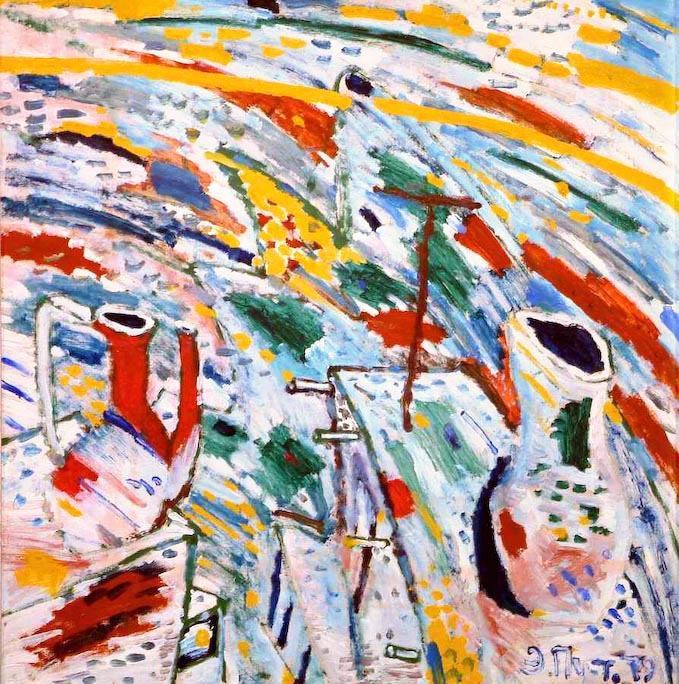
Morning Still Life. 1979. Cardboard, oil painting. 76 x 75

Based on the information from the Album-catalogue of works 1965—1993:

- 1947-1957 - studied in the visual arts workshop in the House of Young Pioneers and the House of Folk Arts
- 1957-1962 - studied in Dagestan State University on the physics and mathematics faculty
- 1962 – started teaching draftsmanship, descriptive geometry, geometry and perspective in Dagestan Art School named after M.A.Djemal
- 1975 – became a member of Artists’ Union of USSR; started working as the chief designer/decorator of Kumyk Music and Drama Theatre named after A.P.Salavatov
- 1979 – received the title of laureate of Republic Prize of Dagestanian Autonomous Soviet Socialist Republic named after Gamzat Tsadasa
- 1980 - received the Diploma of USSR-wide contest of German (GDR) dramaturgy on Soviet stage for decorating the play named «Mann ist Mann» (Man Equals Man) by Bertolt Brecht
- 1981 - received the title of Honoured Art Worker of Dagestanian Autonomous Soviet Socialist Republic
- 1985-1993 – worked as the chief designer/decorator of Russian State Theatre of Drama named after Maxim Gorky
- 1990-1991 – creative journeys to Germany (Blankenheim, Oldenburg), France, Hungary, Poland, Lithuania and Latvia
- 1993 – came to a tragic end

== Art works ==
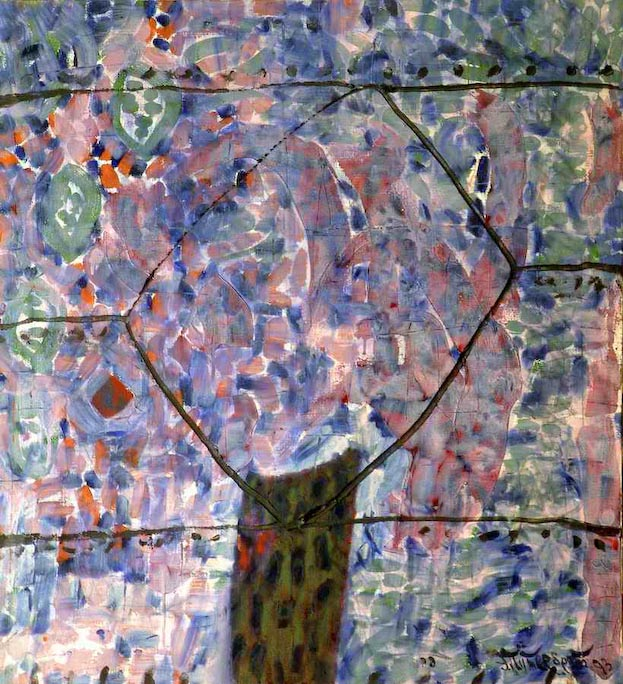
Love Game. 1993. Canvas, tempera, oil painting. 80 x 72

According to William Meyland, «Eduard Puterbrot was universal: theatre set design, painting, easel graphics, poster, small plastic art». «The artist viewed all the landscape of mountainous country surrounding him from the childhood as a huge theater stage. Dagestan nourished his art work constantly.» As evaluated by the art critic, Puterbrot had refuted the known formula by Rudyard Kipling (from The Ballad of East and West) "East is East and West is West, and never the twain shall meet". In his rendition the East and West were shifting and combining. He was a rare connoisseur of culture and art of multilingual peoples of Dagestan, but he also strove to see the whole world and avidly interested himself in contemporary art, frequently came to Moscow and other art centers of the country.

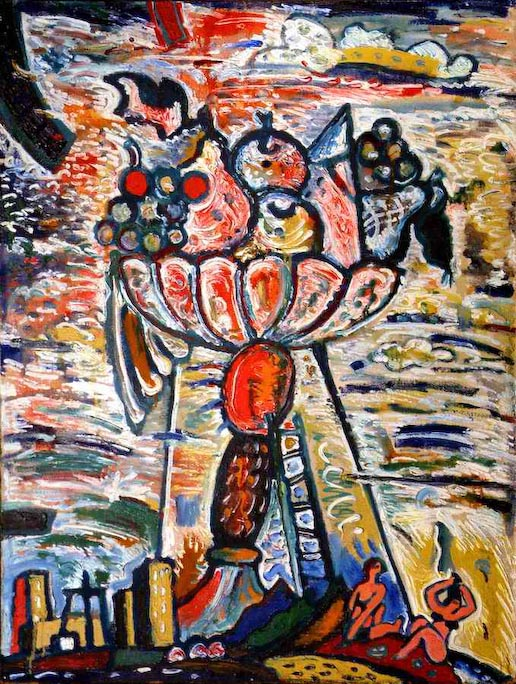
Sunny Day. 1977. Paper board, oil painting. 103 x 80

According to the Moscow art scholar Ivan Kuptsov: «Eduard Puterbrot, like no other, was true to the Dagestan traditions, high culture of effulgent, but subtle light combinations. … His art works are perspicacious, figurative, they possess the scale and epic nature, … where each detail is transformed by his intuition»". «Eduard Puterbrot understood painting not as the music through color, but as writing through color, and in that peculiarity is his fundamental distinction from the lack of subject as an experiment and the color and form creation», — wrote painter Yuri Avgustovich.

Eduard Puterbrot was working on the «translation» of symbolics of ancient rituals, sacral images, legends of Dagestan into the language of contemporary art. As noted by the art scholar and critic Viktor Martynov, «The legends, stories, myths, and fairy-tales of highland peoples intertwined in his aesthetic consciousness in a tight clew of impulsive passions, intuitive insights, unexpected associations and reader-book reminiscences».

== Exhibitions, awards ==
2010 was announced the "Year of Eduard Puterbrot in Dagestan" by «Бизнес-Успех» magazine. In the article dedicated to 70 years anniversary of Eduard Puterbrot, Yulia Goloveshkiva describes exhibitions organized on various art-platforms of the Republic.

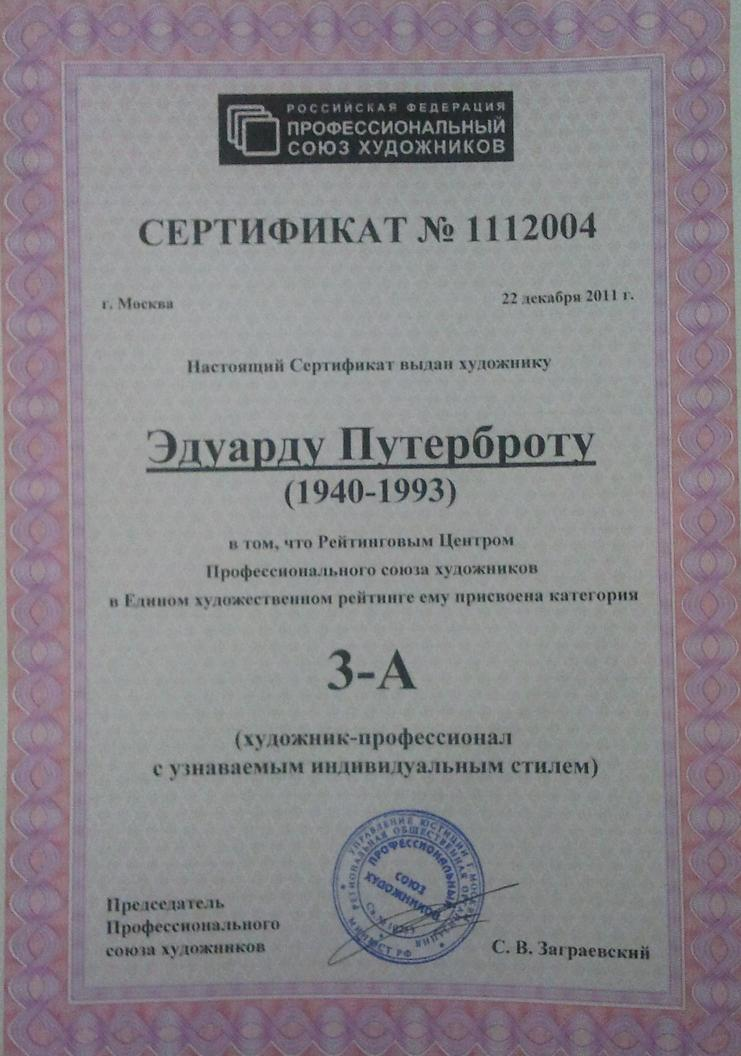
Certificate of Unified Art Rating of Professional Artists' Union of Russia

The following exhibitions and projects are mentioned:

— exhibition «Memory», organized in April 2010 in Moscow by the Museum of History of the city of Makhachkala;

— project of painter Magomed Kazhlayev «Code»: Eduard Puterbrot and the painters of Dagestan";

— «Martian bread» — memorial evening and exhibition of works based on theatre set design of Eduard Puterbrot in the gallery of art scholar Vagidat Shamadayeva;

— large exposition of works by Eduard Puterbrot from the collection of artist's family in the framework of the "First Gallery" project (Republic of Dagestan);

— Album-catalogue «Eduard Puterbrot. Revival»;

— collection of articles by the artist and about the artist, compiled by Dzhamilya Dagirova from the libraries and archives of artist's friends.

Eduard Puterbrot is included into the Unified Art Rating and into International Art Rating of Professional Artists' Union of Russia «10000 best artists of the world» with an attribute of «category better or equal to three». Certificate of Unified Art Rating of Professional Artists' Union of Russia testifies the conferment of category 3-A.

== Gallery ==
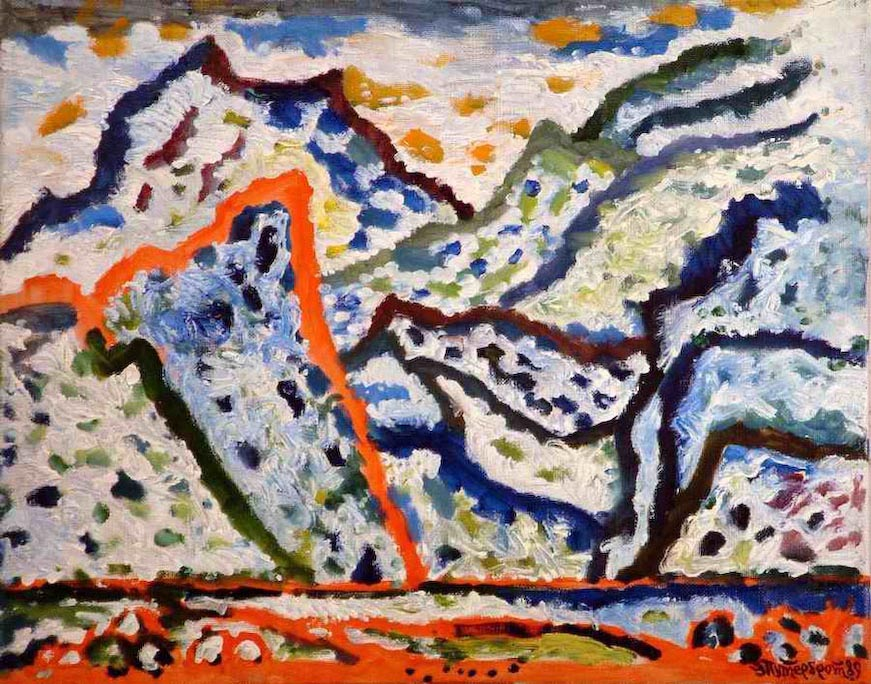
Mountains. 1989. Canvas, oil painting. 70 х 56

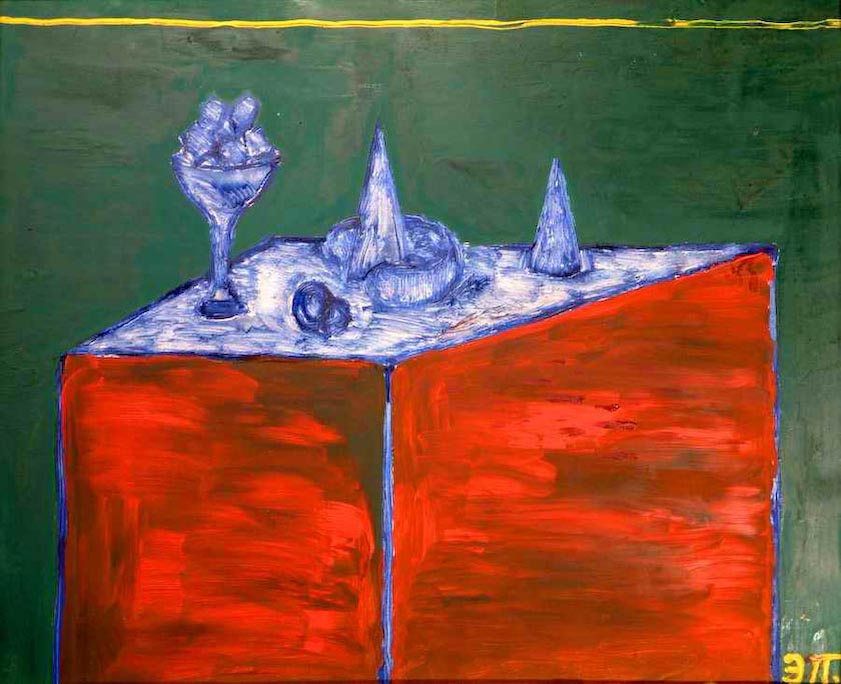
Still Life on Green. 1978. Cardboard, oil painting. 67 х 83
