= Highlanders from Wit =

- Genre: sketch comedy
- Created by: Eldar Iraziev
- Screenplay by: Eldar Iraziev
- Directed by: Eldar Iraziev
- Starring: Eldar Iraziev; Yusup Omarov; Khalil Musayev; Khadzhimurad Nabiev
- Country of origin: Russia
- Original language: Russian

Production
- Production location: Dagestan

Highlanders from Wit (Gorci ot uma, Russian: Горцы от ума) is a Russian sketch comedy show.

== History ==
Sketch-show "Gorci ot uma" appeared in 2008. Series were published on the official website of the project hahachkala.ru, YouTube and Molodejj TV. The first five seasons were also released on DVD.

The main cast of the show has toured with concerts in many Russian cities, as well as in the USA and Kazakhstan.

== Main cast ==
- Eldar Iraziev (since 2008)
- Yusup Omarov (since 2008)
- Khalil Musayev (since 2008)
- Khadzhimurad Nabiev (since 2008)
- Rukiyat Khalidova (Abdurakhmanova) (since 2008)
- Omar Alibutaev (since 2012)

== Awards ==
- 2016 – YouTube Silver Play Button.
- 2017 – Gratitude of the Head of the Republic of Ingushetia.

== Critical response ==
Columnist of the newspaper "Dagestankaya Pravda", Tagirat Hasanova, wrote: "My youngest son, after these "Mountaineers of mind", just started gawking at each other, accompanying every word with interjections as Iraziev. And the eldest laughed when he said that he wanted to follow the example of the film's heroes to sit in a restaurant with friends, drink vodka and shout incoherent words. It's good that it did not last long - two or three days".

The former editor-in-chief of the newspaper "Chernovik" Nadira Isayeva wrote a: "Look at the" humorous "videos of a group of former Dagestani KVN boxers "Mountaineers of mind" on YouTube. They represent the Dagestanians as idiots with a single convolutions in their heads and an unregulated Russian speech. The videos have hundreds of thousands, even millions of views. "Mountaineers of mind" seemed to have conspired with the site "Kavkazpress" in the global virtual space to form their opinion about the kinsmen as morons. Only if "Kavkazpress" is a federal publication under the control of the special services of Russia, "Mountaineers of mind" is a product of local "cultural figures". In fact, people who make a laughingstock of their people are generally considered to be national traitors".
