= Salavat Salavatov =

Soviet and Russian painter (1922–2005)

Salavat Magomedovich Salavatov (Russian: Салава́т Магоме́дович Салава́тов; 21 May 1922, in Buynaksk – 5 July 2005, in Moscow) was a Russian and Soviet landscape painter and book illustrator. He has been given the title of Honored Artists of the RSFSR and People's Artist of Dagestan. Salavatov illustrated more than 100 books. In 2006, an art gallery in one of Moscow's secondary schools was named in his honor. In 2017, a memorial plate was installed in memory of Salavatov in Makhachkala.

Salavat Salavatov

== Biography ==
Salavatov was born in Buynaksk, Dagestan. In school days visited studio of the fine arts at the House of art education of children, and later studio at the Ministry of Culture of the Dagestan at the honored worker of arts of Dagestan Dmitry Kapanitsyn. In 1936 at the International exhibition children's drawings were exhibited water colors "From an aul Chirkey". He participated in the Second World War. At liberation of Donbass it was seriously injured. Since the end of 1944 he was worked as the set dresser at theater, newspapers, publishing houses of Dagestan. From 1961 to 1967 - the chairman of the board of The Artists' Union of the Dagestan. For merits in the fine arts is awarded the order "Honour Sign" and honorary titles "The honored artist of the RSFSR", "The national artist of the Dagestan". Since 1950 the participant of all exhibitions of the fine arts in Dagestan, zone, All-Russian, and also the International exhibition of books in Berlin. A big series of watercolors and graphics is in The Dagestan Museum of Fine Arts, Makhachkala. The exhibitions were held in Paris, Tokyo, Berlin, Moscow, Saint Petersburg, Makhachkala, Derbent, Maykop. Salavatov died on 5 July 2005 in Moscow.

Salavat Salavatov. "The Black grouse and Fox". 1982

== State and public awards ==
- Honored Artists of the RSFSR
- People's Artist of Dagestan
- Order of the Badge of Honour
- Order of the Patriotic War
- Jubilee Medal "In Commemoration of the 100th Anniversary of the Birth of Vladimir Ilyich Lenin"
- Jubilee Medal "Thirty Years of Victory in the Great Patriotic War 1941–1945"
- Jubilee Medal "60 Years of Victory in the Great Patriotic War 1941–1945"
