= Gadzhimurat Kamalov =

Russian assassinated journalist (1965–2011)

- Хаджимурад Камалов
- Born: 11 February 1965; Sogratl, Dagestan ASSR, Russian SFSR, Soviet Union
- Died: 15 December 2011 (aged 46); Makhachkala, Republic of Dagestan, Russia
- Occupations: Publisher, editor and investigative journalist
- Years active: 2003–2011
- Notable credit(s): Founder and publisher of Chernovik (2003–2011), Editor-in-chief of Chernovik (2005–2006)

Gadzhimurat (Note: Sometimes transliterated as Gadjimurat, Gadzhimurad, Khadzhimurat, or Khadzhimurad.) Magomedovich Kamalov, (Russian: Хаджимурад Магомедович Камалов; 11 February 1965 – 15 December 2011) was a Russian investigative journalist and the owner of Svoboda Slova (translated as "Freedom of Speech"), the media company that published the newspaper Chernovik.

Kamalov was shot dead in an apparent assassination as his name had been put on a hit list for his reporting on Muslim rebel activity in the Republic of Dagestan, and he had been well known for his reporting on corruption. His death had a chilling effect on other journalists.

== Personal life ==
Gadzhimurat Kamalov, an ethnic Avar, was born in the village of Sogratl, in the Gunibsky District of Dagestan, Russia. He was married and had one child. His uncle, Ali Kamalov, was the chair of the Union of Journalists in Dagestan at the time his nephew was killed.

He was educated in engineering at the Dagestan Polytechnic Institute in 1982 and later at the Leningrad Technical University in 1990.

Kamalov began his journalism career by working at the New Business (Russian: Новое Дело). After founding a major newspaper in Dagestan, he served as press secretary for President Mukhu Aliyev, whose term lasted from 2006 to 2010. Kamalov was also a member of the president's Council of Economic Advisers under President Magomedsalam Magomedov.

== Work ==
On 19 August 2003, Kamalov founded the newspaper Chernovik (Russian: Черновик, which translates as "Rough Draft"), which was well known for investigating government corruption in Dagestan.

The most controversial article published in Chernovik was "Terrorist No. 1", which included quotes from Rappani Khalilov, in July 2008, and that led to a legal case between the government and Chernovik that lasted until May 2011. Khalilov was killed on 18 September 2007 before the article was published. He had been sought after as a high-profile terrorist target because of his involvement in the 1999 raid from Chechnya into Dagestan and a 2002 bombing that killed 40 people. The editor of Chernovik was called to the prosecutor's office and warned before charges were filed.

According to Nadira Isayeva, the editor-in-chief of Chernovik at the time it published the Khalilov article and during its legal struggles, "Khadzhimurad had many enemies. He wasn't afraid to spell out his motto: 'A newspaper does not need friends.' He was not without an element of the cavalier. He could go off for some meeting with some frostbitten bandits and come back unharmed. He loved investigating corruption. Many of those exposed by his revelations – senior civil servants, police officers and staff at the prosecutor's office – had criminal pasts, and presents. Some were dangerous and not afraid of killing. Often there were confrontations with the heads of Dagestan's municipalities, many of whom are bandits."

Biyakai Magomedov, the current editor of Chernovik, said, "The corrupt structures have been afraid of us. [...] They couldn’t defeat us in courts, because we won practically all the cases." The main case against Chernovik had ended in acquittal on 19 May 2011.

At one point, when Chernovik lost its financial backers, Kamalov took out loans using his flat as collateral, despite the fact that his wife and child lived there. He also would sell off office equipment, until he finally found new backers.

As the owner, Kamalov did not interfere with the editorial content of the newspaper and he encouraged his journalists to report the truth, according to accounts by Mairbek Agayev, a political columnist for Chernovik, and Mahir Pashayev, a business and economics reporter. "It is the only newspaper without any censorship," said Pashayev.

== Media source ==
Besides being behind the news, Gadzhimurat Kamalov was often called on to be a source for media outlets who were looking for an expert to analyze the deteriorating situation in Dagestan.

=== Ekho Moskvy radio, Moscow, 8 July 2005 ===
[Kamalov]: "Neither the opposition, nor the Republic of Dagestan's official regional authorities, will be able to sort this situation out [... ] I can tell you that the people are increasingly going to the mosques already with the fully conscious understanding that the laws of the Russian Federation cannot operate in the Republic of Dagestan, but that the alternative traditional laws work. To be more exact, those with a basis in Shar'iah law work. And so the number of people with such an understanding of legislation and law-enforcement is increasing. And neither the opposition, nor the regional authorities, faced with this fully formed third force are able to handle this."

=== Kamalov questions security operation ===
On 28 June 2008, Kamalov told Ekho Moskvy, Moscow, that the security forces had killed three people who were not militants but one was a university educator whom Kamalov knew. Kamalov said, "A knock on the door [...] is considered a dangerous thing here. Here everybody is afraid of the police. He once told me that if at any time they would come to his place, he would refuse to open the door. It was precisely because he was afraid of an unauthorized search of his flat that [he] must have refused to open the door to them. Thus, they had a justification to storm the flat." The same account was published in print.

== Activism ==
On 26 September 2005, Gadzhimurat Kamalov organized an unprecedented protest in Makhachkala against the action of the Federal Agency for the Press and Mass Communication to stop the printing and distribution of issues of the Chernovik. Fifty journalists and supporters participated in the protest.

On 25 November 2011, Kamalov led a protest of somewhere between 3,000 and 5,700 participants against the unlawful use of force and the disappearance of civilians allegedly by security forces, an issue on which Chernovik has focused.

== Death ==
Assassination of Gadzhimurat Kamalov
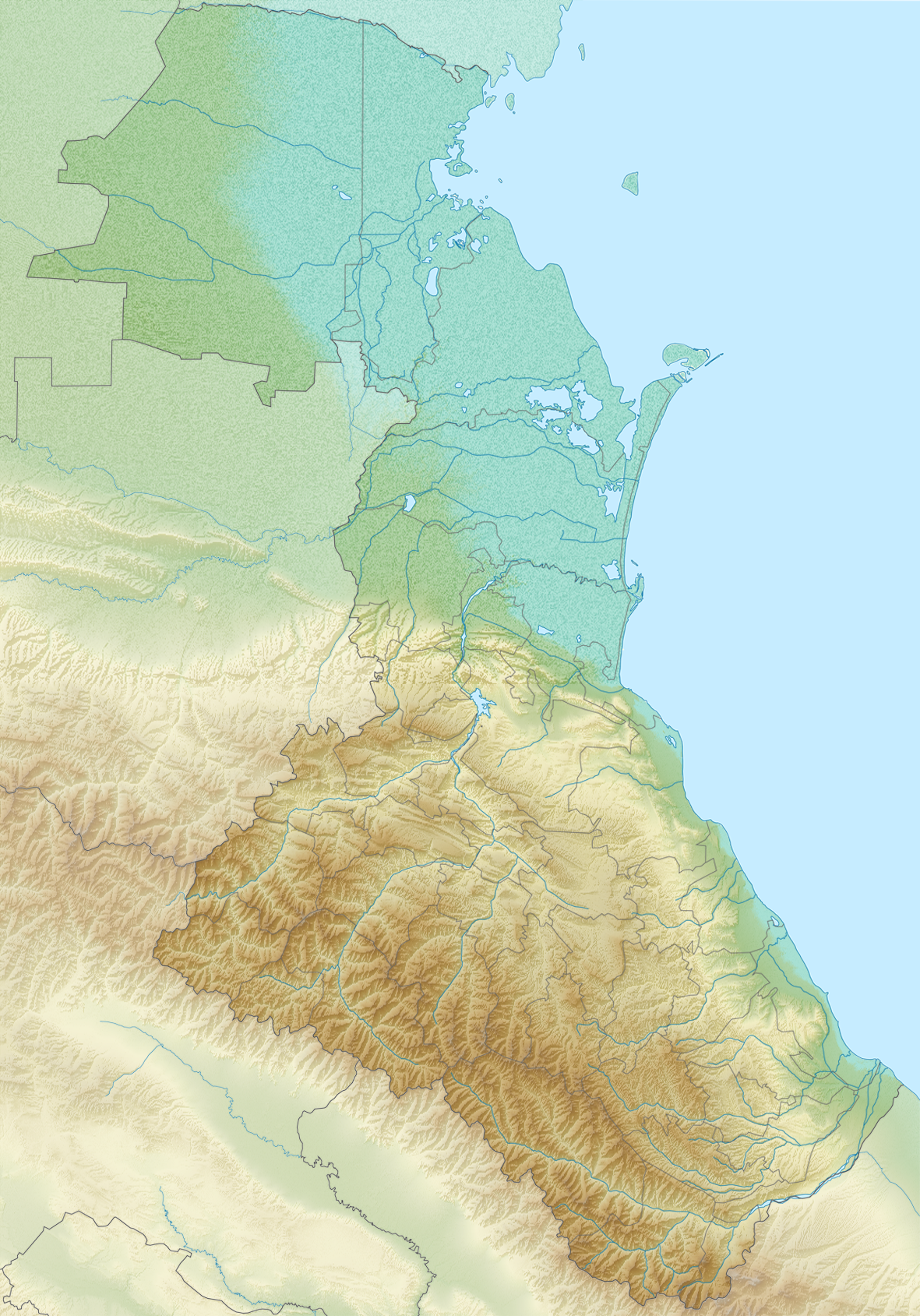
- Location: Makhachkala, Republic Dagestan, Russia
- Date: 15 December 2011
- Deaths: 1

Kamalov was shot eight times as he was exiting Chernovik's headquarters on Magomed Hajiyev Street in Makhachkala, Dagestan, a Russian province in the north Caucasus region, around 11:45 p.m., 15 December 2011. The gunman was masked, shot 14 rounds in total, and sped away from the scene of the crime in a black Lada Priora. Kamalov had previously received death threats in September 2009 when he was one of eight journalists included in a hit list distributed anonymously in Makhachkala. The list claimed to be seeking revenge for the deaths of police and civilians during Dagestan's unrest. Kamalov may have been included for his sympathetic portrayals of rebel fighters.

Hundreds attended Kamalov's funeral.

== Reactions ==
Tanya Lokshina, deputy director of Human Rights Watch in Moscow, said: "Kamalov's death is terrible and it will have a monstrous effect on the free press in Dagestan. He had many enemies because of Chernovik's searching reports on corrupt businesses and the transgressions of the local siloviki [law enforcement bodies]." Lokshina blamed the murder on the Russian authorities' governing of the region: "Even if there was a personal aspect to his murder then it became possible because of the atmosphere of complete impunity which the Russian authorities have allowed to flourish there."

The New York-based Committee to Protect Journalists said that the "murder of Gadzhimurat Kamalov [...] is a lethal blow to press freedom", adding that his murder was "a massive loss for independent journalism in the North Caucasus, Russia's most dangerous place for reporters". The CPJ had already awarded its press freedom award in 2010 to Chernovik's former editor Nadira Isayeva, and the newspaper's reputation for modern muckraker journalism was well known outside of the North Caucasus.

The United Nations Office of the High Commissioner for Human Rights and UNESCO both called for a credible investigation into the Kamalov assassination. Irina Bokova, the director-general of UNESCO, said, "Fear must not be allowed to muzzle media professionals, deny reporters the basic human right of freedom of expression and bar citizens from accessing information."

Magomedsalam Magomedov, president of Dagestan, said: "He always came out for unity and peace, and carrying out dialogue [...] This is a big loss not just for journalists, but for the whole republic." The president's office officially took control over the murder investigation.

Saygidpasha Umakhanov, a prominent mayor in Dagestan, said, "[Gadzhimurat] was indeed an independent and honest journalist. It's impossible to find another like him.... His numerous friends and the healthy forces in society will do everything to find the killer. [But for that] we really need to be united."

== Impact ==
Yulia Latynina, an expert on the Caucasus region, said, "Just as [Anna] Politkovskaya's death meant the loss of information about Chechnya, Kamalov's death will mean that to a large extent we will stop to understand what's going on in Dagestan. People will simply be scared to write anything."

== Context ==
According to the BBC, assassination in Dagestan has become routine as the levels of violence in the autonomous Republic of Dagestan have risen. The republic is seated between the Caspian Sea and Chechnya. Whereas in Chechnya, rebels have been advocating independence from Russia, in Dagestan the conflict with the rebels is described as more diffuse. Dagestan is a muli-ethnic country with Avars being the largest among them. The majority of citizens practice Sufi Islam but younger people are attracted to the Salafist brand of Islam. The mafia is active throughout the country and use violence, kidnapping and murder to intimidate victims. The security forces in the country are visible and also use violence to achieve their goals. The problems of Chechnya have spilled over into Dagestan since war broke out there in the early 1990s and the struggle with Dagestan's Muslim rebels has been going on since that time. In the last years, the situation has become more intense. The problems feeding the violence in Dagestan are therefore a diffuse blend of ethnic, religious, generational, criminal, and authoritarian causes.

Dagestan's press is described by both BBC News and Reporters Without Borders as "pluralistic," but the availability of many sources has not lowered tensions. Dunja Mijatovic, who is the Organization for Security and Co-operation in Europe Representative on Freedom of the Media, said, "Daghestan and the Northern Caucasus are known to be among the most dangerous places in the world for journalists." Press freedom organizations, such as the Committee to Protect Journalists (CPJ) and Reporters Without Borders, have called for the immediate investigation of Kamalov's murder. Russia, however, is on the CPJ's list of the top 10 countries with the worst records of impunity in the killing of journalists. From 2000 until the time of Kamalov's death, Russia has accrued 18 unsolved cases of murders of journalists, according to the CPJ. CPJ lists three journalists from Dagestan before Kamalov who have been killed since 2000 in Makhachkala:

- Malik Akhmedilov, the daily editor of the Hakikat (Translated: The Truth), was killed on 11 August 2009.
- Abdulla Alishayev, a TV host on TV-Chirkei, was killed on 2 September 2008.
- Magomedzagid Varisov, the editor of Novoye Delo, was killed on 28 June 2005.

Other journalists who were killed but were unconfirmed by CPJ:

- Gadzhi Abashilov, the head of Dagestan's state broadcasting company, was killed in Makhachkala on 21 March 2008.

Additionally, Reporters Without Borders lists:

- Yakhya Magomedov, a journalist working for Assalam (Russian: Ассалам), was killed in Kokrek, Dagestan on 8 May 2011.

The newspapers in Dagestan with the highest circulations have all experienced the murder of one of their journalists. The top selling news products in Dagestan, include Assalam, which has the highest circulation and is a moderate Muslim bi-weekly; Novoye Delo and Chernovik. Unlike the others, Chernovik is an independent newspaper. The newspaper targets the civically engaged audience demographic between the ages of 28 and 45, which makes up 80% of its readership. The popularity of the media has a negative side. The media are caught in the middle as they are a visible target in which all the forces facing Dagestan can attack to get at their enemies (p. 9).
