= Anatoly Yagudaev =

Russian sculptor

- Анатолий Ягудаев
- Born: March 11, 1935; Makhachkala, Dagestan USSR, Russia
- Died: October 10, 2014 (aged 79); Makhachkala, Russia, Dagestan
- Known for: sculpture
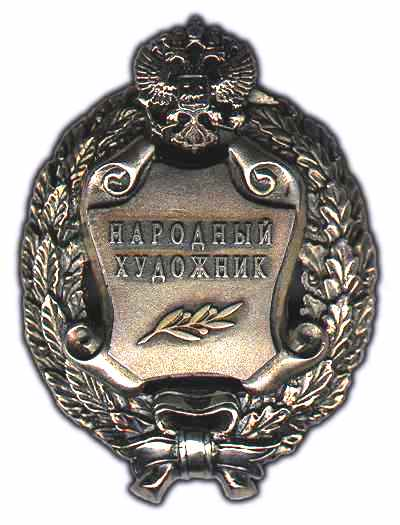
- Awards

Anatoly Yagudaev (Russian: Анатолий Михайлович Ягудаев, romanized: Anatóliy Mikháylovich Yagudayev; March 11, 1935 – October 10, 2014) was a Soviet /Russian sculptor of Mountain Jewish descent. In 2002, he was awarded the title of People's Artist of the Russian Federation.

== Biography ==
Yagudaev's ancestors came from Temir-Khan-Shura (now the city of Buynaksk, Republic of Dagestan). His father, a staunch communist, named his son Anatoly in honor of the People's Commissariat for Education, Anatoly Lunacharsky, who died in 1933.

As a child, Anatoly Yagudaev studied in the fine arts class at the Makhachkala House of Pioneers with the teacher Y. I. Lashkevich and in the art studio of the House of Folk Art under the direction of D. A. Kapanitsyn. In 1949 he began to work in the production and sculptural workshop of the famous Soviet sculptor Mikhail Anikushin – first as an apprentice, and then as a model designer.

While serving in the Soviet army, he was the champion of the Far Eastern Military District in weightlifting.

In 1963, he graduated from the sculpture department of the Saint Petersburg Art School, named after the painter Vladimir Serov. In the same year, he began creating sculptures independently. He then returned to Makhachkala. From 1959 to 2005 he participated in 36 exhibitions of various levels held in many cities of Russia, as well as in Hungary and Bulgaria.

Anatoly Yagudaev was a member of the Artists' Union of the USSR and was awarded the titles of "Honored Art Worker of Dagestan" and "People's Artist of the Russian Federation," as well as being a laureate of the Dagestan Republican Prize named after Gamzat Tsadasa."

Yagudaev’s two works created from bronze were: "Portrait of Doctor of Philology Kamil Khanmurzaev" (1964) and "Jokesters" (1985). They were presented in the State Tretyakov Gallery and also 27 works were in the collection of Dagestan Museum of Fine Arts named after Patimat Gamzatov. Other locations to find the master's works are streets and squares decorated in the cities of Makhachkala, Buynaksk, Izberbash and Aktau, and in the villages of Dylym and Agvali. It was also used in the design of Chirkey Dam, a hydroelectric power station. The park sculpture of a girl at the corner of Maxim Gorky and Buynaksk Streets in Makhachkala has become an urban symbol of love and goodness though it disappeared in the 1990s.

In the American city of Spokane, Washington, the twin city of Makhachkala, a sculpture of Shamil, 3rd Imam of Dagestan by Yagudaev has been installed.

== Awards ==
- Honored Art Worker of Dagestan
- People's Artist of the Russian Federation
- Laureate of the Dagestan Republican Prize named after Gamzat Tsadasa.
