= Nadira Isayeva =

Russian journalist

- Born: Dagestan, Russia
- Occupation: journalist
- Organization: Chernovik
- Known for: reporting on North Caucasus
- Awards: International Press Freedom Award (2010)

Nadira Rashidovna Isayeva (Russian: Надира Рашидовна Исаева; born 29 July 1979), sometimes spelled Isaeva, is a Russian journalist who has been internationally recognized for her reporting on security issues in North Caucasus.

Isayeva is editor-in-chief of the weekly newspaper Chernovik (English: Rough Draft) in Dagestan, described by Reporters Without Borders as "Dagestan’s leading independent newspaper". In this role, she ran a series of articles criticizing the Federal Security Service's tactics in fighting the region's insurgency.

In 2008, she published an interview with a former guerrilla leader in which the subject accused local authorities of corruption and connections to the Kremlin. She was subsequently arrested on 31 July under anti-extremist legislation for "inciting hatred toward law enforcement officials" and other charges. If convicted, she would have faced up to five years' imprisonment. Chernovik reporters Magomed Magomedov, Artur Mamayev and Timur Mustafayev were also charged, along with their lawyer Biyakai Magomedov.

The trial began in January 2010, with the prosecution claiming that Isayeva's articles "publicly justified terrorism". The prosecution also required her to take part in multiple psychological and linguistic examinations, on which its case was largely built. Following a defense challenge, the findings of these examinations were overturned by the Federal Centre for Forensic Examination in Moscow, and the case against Isayeva and her colleagues was dismissed on 19 May 2011. Following her acquittal, Isayeva stated that she saw the case as "a test for the institution of press freedom" in Dagestan.

Isayeva's reporting and prosecution drew the attention of numerous press and press freedom organizations. The editorial board of the US newspaper The Washington Post has praised Isayeva's work, calling her a "first-rate journalist" and "hero". UK press freedom group ARTICLE 19 condemned her prosecution as part of a "trend" of harassment by authorities of Dagestani reporters. Reporters Without Borders and the Committee to Protect Journalists both hailed her acquittal, and the latter organization awarded her a 2010 International Press Freedom Award for risking her "freedom and security" for her reporting.

Following continued harassment by authorities, Isayeva left Dagestan in November 2011. On 15 December Gadzhimurat Kamalov, Isayeva's former boss at Chernovik and close colleague, was shot dead by an unknown gunman. CPJ described his death as "a lethal blow to press freedom" and "a massive loss for independent journalism in the North Caucasus, Russia's most dangerous place for reporters".

After staying with friends in Moscow for two months, Isayeva was named a visiting scholar at Columbia University's Harriman Institute in the U.S., arriving there in February 2012.
