= Makhachkala Lighthouse =

Lighthouse in Russia

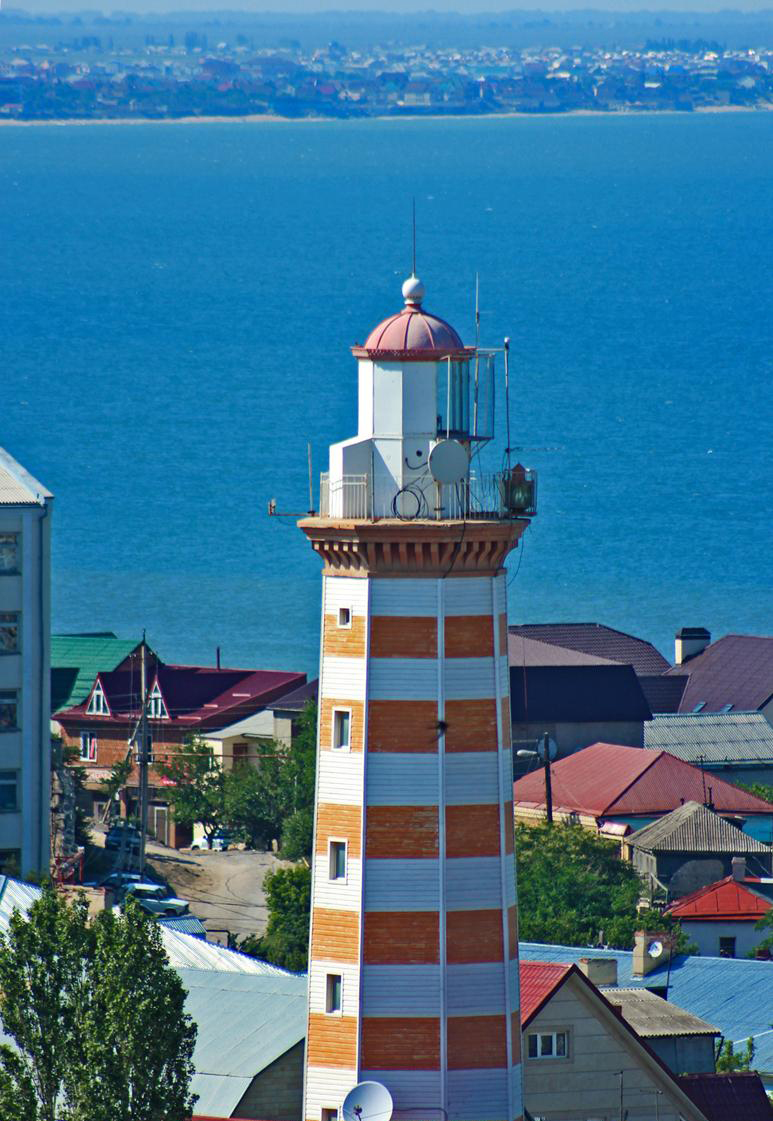
- Location: Makhachkala, Russia
- Coordinates: 42°59′08″N 47°29′56″E

Tower
- Constructed: 1852
- Construction: stone
- Height: 27 m (89 ft)
- Shape: octagonal prism
- Markings: White (tower), red (stripe), white (lantern), red (roof)
- Heritage: regional cultural heritage site in Russia

Light
- Focal height: 84.5 m (277 ft)
- Range: 24 nmi (44 km; 28 mi)

The Makhachkala Lighthouse is an operating lighthouse in the city Makhachkala, a capital of the Russian Republic of Dagestan. It is a landmark of the city.

== History ==
The initiator of the construction of lighthouses in the Caspian Sea was the Caucasian governor M. S. Vorontsov.

According to legend, the first lighthouse in the Port-Petrovsk Fortress was built in 1852 on the mountain Tarki-Tau, at the place where the Russian Emperor Peter the Great laid the first stone in the foundation of the Port-Petrovsk Fortress. Initially, it was a white tower, the light of eight lamps at a height of 75 meters above sea level was amplified by reflectors, the visibility of the light reached 18 miles.

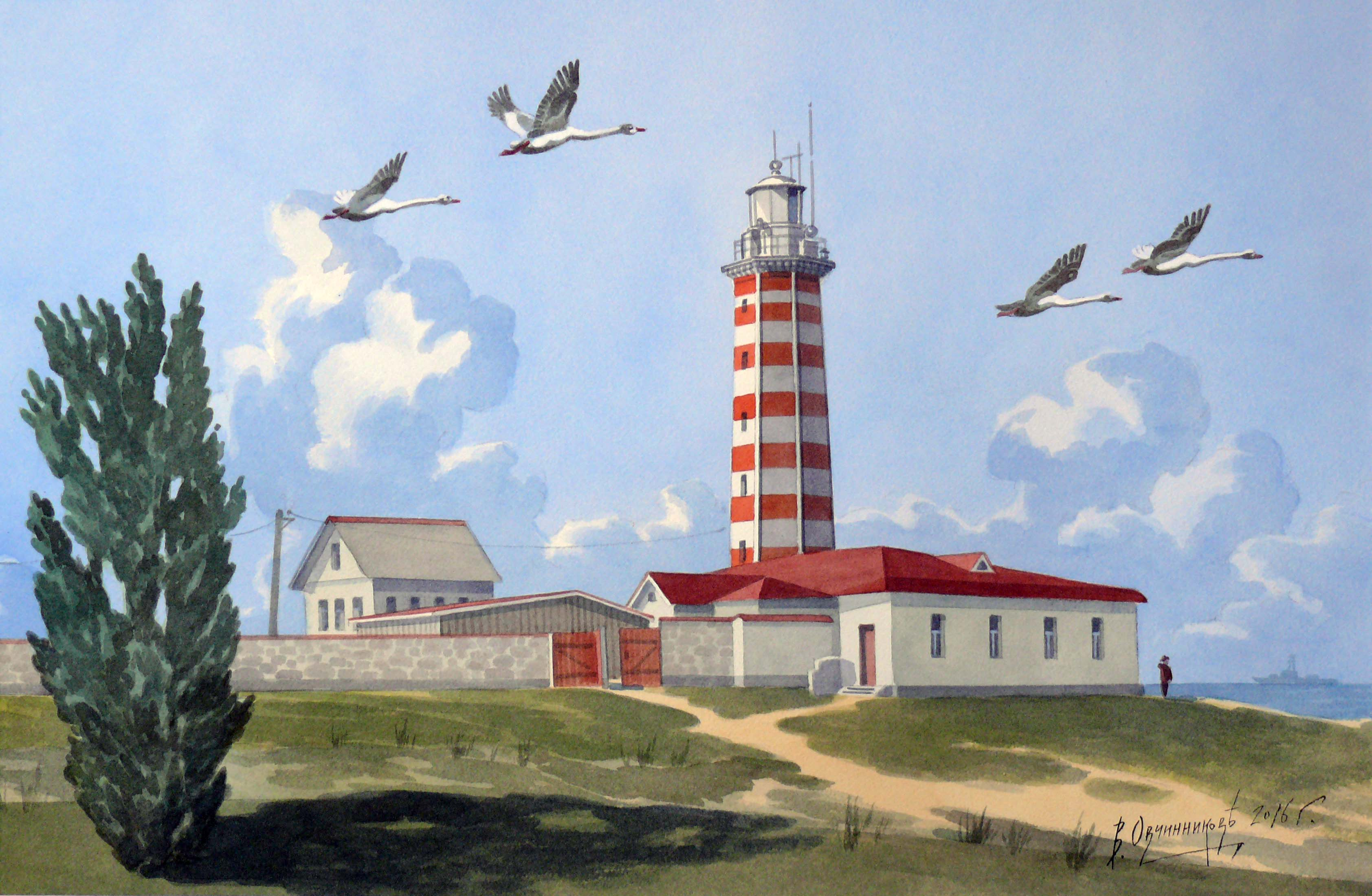
Makhachkala Lighthouse by painter Vyacheslav Ovchinnikov

With the development of the city and the port, the lighthouse ceased to be the most noticeable building in the city. In 1866 it was rebuilt under the supervision of the Hydrographic Unit of the Caspian Flotilla in a new, more successful place, on Mountain Anzhi-Arka. The height of the new tower was 27 meters (about 80 meters above the sea surface), the visibility of fire was 15 miles. In 1895, the luminosity of the lighthouse was increased, the fire was set higher. At the beginning of the 20th century, the lighthouse was painted with red stripes on a white background, clearly visible at any time of the year. In 1912, oil lamps replaced kerosene incandescent burners, and in 1928, acetylene lighting was introduced.

With the beginning of the World War II, the lighthouse was turned off and started working only in 1944. The lighthouse was turned off in the 1990s (for two months) for non-payment of electricity bills.

At the end of the 20th century, the dilapidated building was repaired. In 2008, a white flashing light was installed at the lighthouse. It is visible up to 24 miles away. The lighthouse is fully automated and is serviced by a single employee - the head of the navigation equipment production group. In 2014, preventive maintenance was carried out at the lighthouse, and modernised light-optical equipment was installed.

== Literature ==
- "History of my city. Makhachkala". - Makhachkala, 2017. p. 160
