= Khaz-Bulat Askar-Sarydzha =

Sculptor

Khaz-Bulat Nukhbekovich Askar-Sarydzha (1900–1982) was a Dagestani sculptor during the Soviet period. He studied with Y. I. Nikoladze in Tbilisi in 1922, and in Leningrad from 1923 to 1926 under V. V. Lishev and A. T. Matveev at the Vkhutein. He began exhibiting his work in 1925; in 1926 he travelled to Italy before returning to Dagestan. In 1937 he moved to Moscow.

Among his works are an equestrian monument to the Soviet Civil War commander Amankeldı İmanov, erected in Alma-Ata in 1950, and various monumental pieces in Makhachkala.
