= National Museum of the Republic of Dagestan =

Natural history museum in Dagestan, Russia

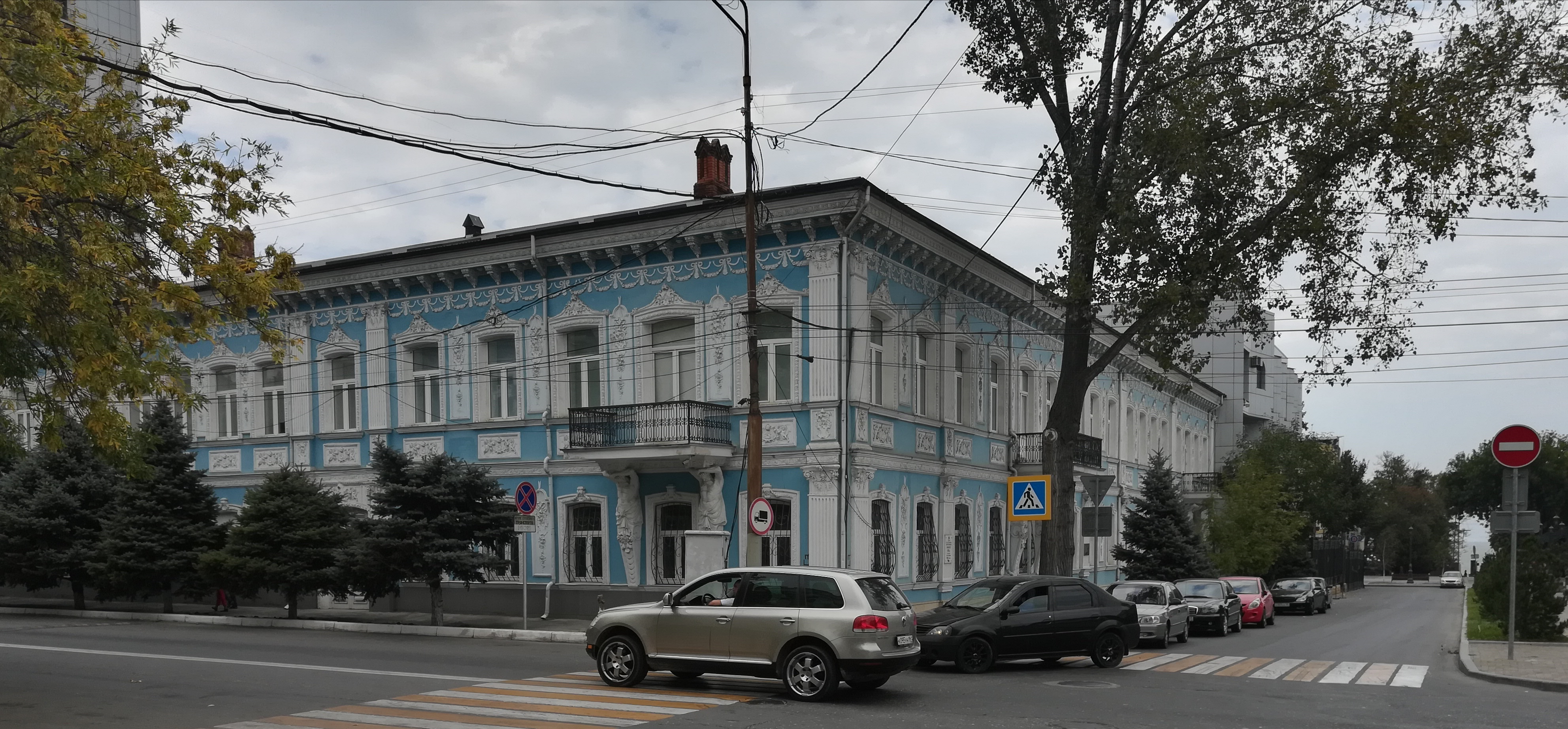
- Interactive fullscreen map
- Established: 1925; 101 years ago
- Location: 31 Daniyalov Street, Makhachkala, Dagestan, Russia.
- Coordinates: 42°58′58″N 47°30′39″E
- Type: Natural history museum
- Director: Магомедов Пахрудин Омарович
- Website: https://dagmuzey.ru/

The National Museum of the Republic of Dagestan named after A. Takho-Godi is a cultural institution of the Republic of Dagestan. It is located at Daniyalov Street, Building 31, in the city of Makhachkala, in the North Caucasus of Russia.

== Exposition ==
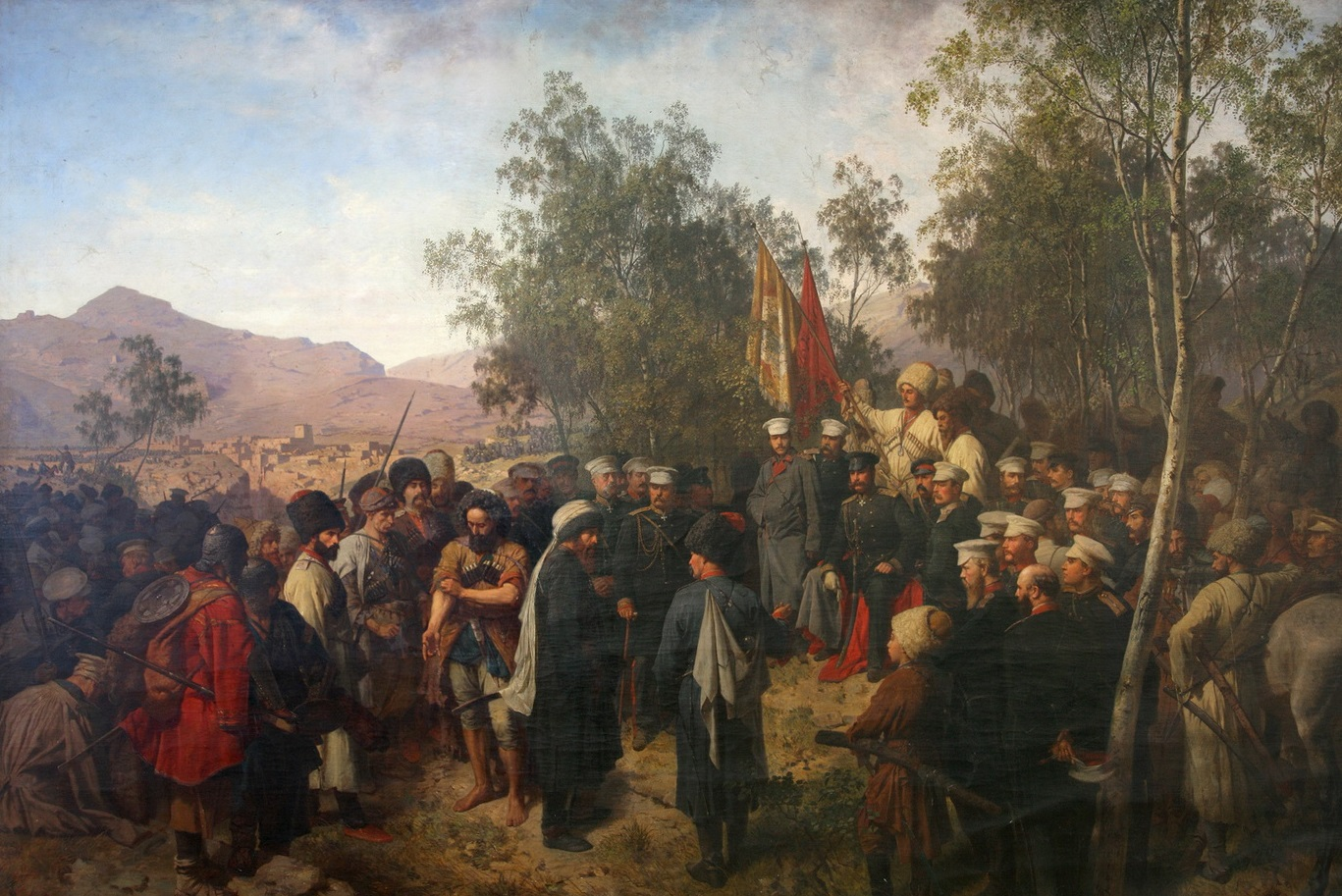
Theodor Horschelt, 1863, "Captured Shamil before the commander-in-chief Prince Baryatinsky on August 25, 1859".

The permanent exhibition occupies 19 halls, there is an exhibition center, and a children's studio. It is the largest museum association in the North Caucasus. The consolidated funds of the museum association (the museum has 39 branches in cities and rural settlements of the republic) contain 180 thousand exhibits. Among them are unique collections of archaeological monuments reflecting the ancient history of Dagestan, ancient manuscripts, ethnographic items, works of painting and decorative and applied art, samples of flora and fauna, documents and materials from various eras of the region's history.

The exhibition is located on two floors of an old mansion, occupies 21 halls and shows the history of the region, traditions, life and crafts. Among the most interesting sections are "Archaeology", "Middle Ages", "Caucasian War", "Ethnography", "Paleontology", "Nature".

Separate exhibits are dedicated to the Caucasian War and Imam Shamil. Several halls have exhibitions about the Soviet period in the history of Dagestan.

The structure of the National Museum includes 7 memorial museums, 2 museums of Military Glory, 30 historical (local history) museums.

In 2016, a Cultural and Exhibition Center was opened on the premises of the National Museum of Dagestan, where contemporary art exhibitions are held.

The museum periodically hosts thematic exhibitions.

== History ==
It was created in November 1923 on the initiative of the outstanding Dagestani public and political figure Alibek Takho-Godi (1892–1937) and opened in 1925. The director of the museum was Dmitry I. Pavlov.

The National Museum is in a historic building built in the late 19th century in the classical style. The house with atlantes in Makhachkala is the only one of the existing buildings of the 19th-20th centuries in the city. As an element of architectural decor, "atlantes supporting a balcony" are built into the building, and the entire facade is richly decorated with stucco on the pediment, windows and base.

In 1904, this house was purchased by the Astrakhan merchant of the 2nd guild and fish industrialist Ivan Vanetsov.

The museum, which can be considered the predecessor of the present one, was organized in 1912 through the efforts of researcher of Dagestan, Evgeny Kozubsky (1851–1911) with money from Ivan Kostemerevsky in the governor's house in Temir-Khan-Shurá. During the years of the revolution of 2017, it was transferred to Makhachkala, partially looted and ceased to exist.

In 1977, museums in the republic's historical centers (Akhty, Kizlyar, Gunib, and Khunzakh) were united into a single Dagestan State Historical and Architectural Museum.

Since 2013, the museum has been in a historical mansion, the "Baryatinsky House", on Daniyalov Street.

== See also ==
- Dagestan Museum of Fine Arts

== Heritage ==
- Cultural heritage site № 0500015000
