= Chernovik =

Newspaper in Russia

Chernovik (Russian: Черновик for "Rough Draft") is a weekly newspaper published by Svoboda Slova (translated as "Freedom of Speech") and based in the Republic of Dagestan, North Caucasus region, Russia. Reporters Without Borders has described it as "Dagestan's leading independent newspaper" and the newspaper with the third largest circulation in Dagestan.

== Leadership ==
The newspaper was founded by Gadzhimurat Kamalov in 2003. Those serving as editor-in-chief include Kamalov (2005–2006), Nadira Isayeva, and Biyakai Magomedov (present).

== Prosecution ==
From 2008 to 2011, following a series of articles critical of the Federal Security Service's counterinsurgency tactics, the newspaper's editor-in-chief, Nadira Isayeva, was involved in a high-profile prosecution for "inciting hatred toward law enforcement officials" and other charges. Chernovik reporters Magomed Magomedov, Artur Mamayev and Timur Mustafayev were also charged, along with their lawyer Biyakai Magomedov. International press freedom organizations ARTICLE 19, Reporters Without Borders, and the Committee to Protect Journalists (CPJ) all protested the charges, the latter awarding Isayeva a 2010 International Press Freedom Award for risking her "freedom and security" for her reporting. All five were later acquitted following a trial Isayeva described as "a test for the institution of press freedom" in Dagestan.

== Murder of Gadzhimurat Kamalov ==
On 15 December 2011 Gadzhimurat Kamalov was assassinated as he left Chernovik's offices. CPJ described his death as "a lethal blow to press freedom" and "a massive loss for independent journalism in the North Caucasus, Russia's most dangerous place for reporters". Tanya Lokshina, deputy director of Human Rights Watch in Moscow, said: "Kamalov's death is terrible and it will have a monstrous effect on the free press in Dagestan. He had many enemies because of Chernovik's searching reports on corrupt businesses and the transgressions of the local siloviki [law enforcement bodies]." Lokshina blamed the murder on the Russian authorities' governing of the region: "Even if there was a personal aspect to his murder then it became possible because of the atmosphere of complete impunity which the Russian authorities have allowed to flourish there."

Yulia Latynina, an expert on the Caucasus region interviewed by the Associated Press, said, "Just as [Anna] Politkovskaya's death meant the loss of information about Chechnya, Kamalov's death will mean that to a large extent we will stop to understand what's going on in Dagestan. People will simply be scared to write anything."
