= Makhachkala =

Makhachkala Махачкала
- City
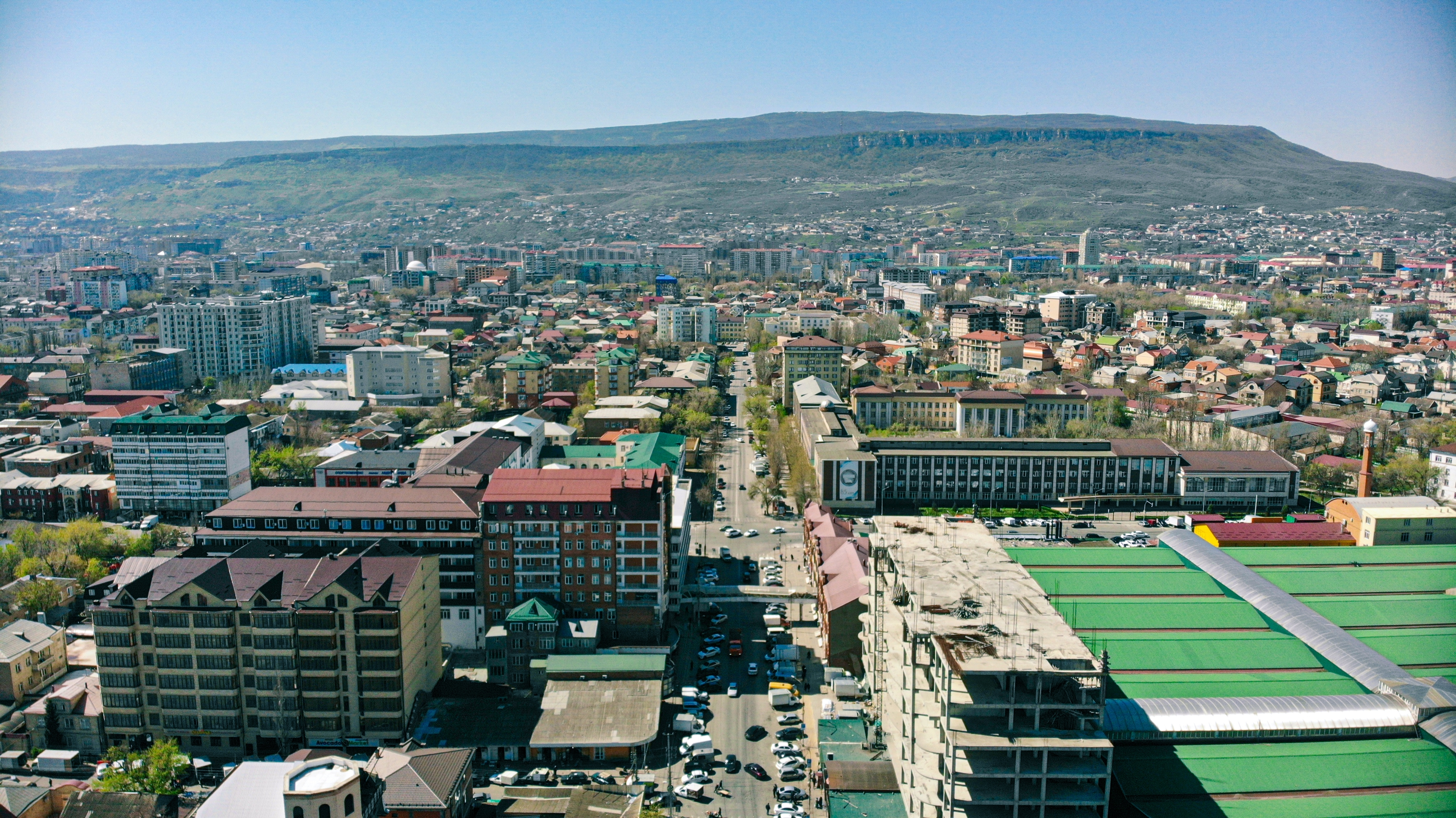
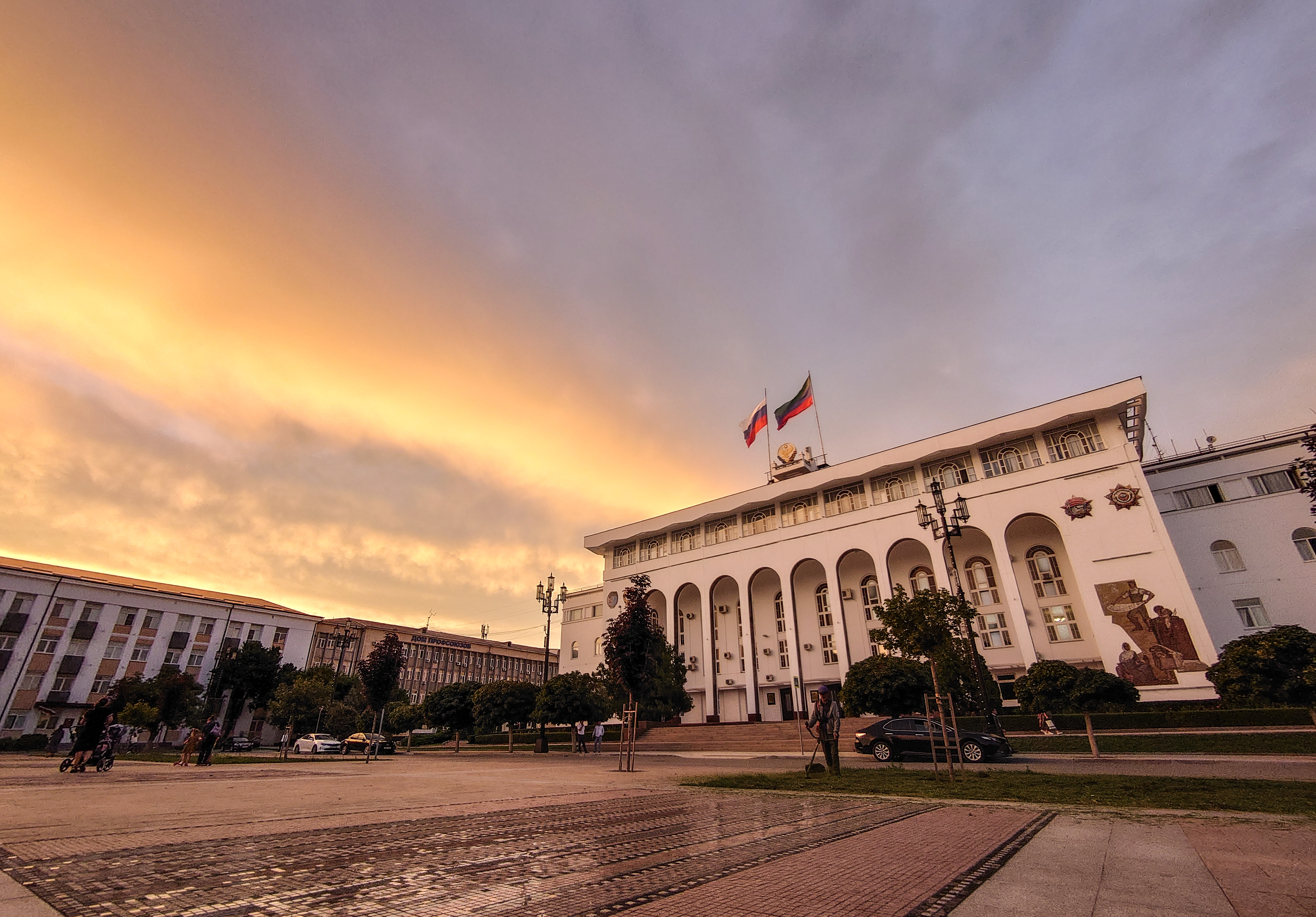
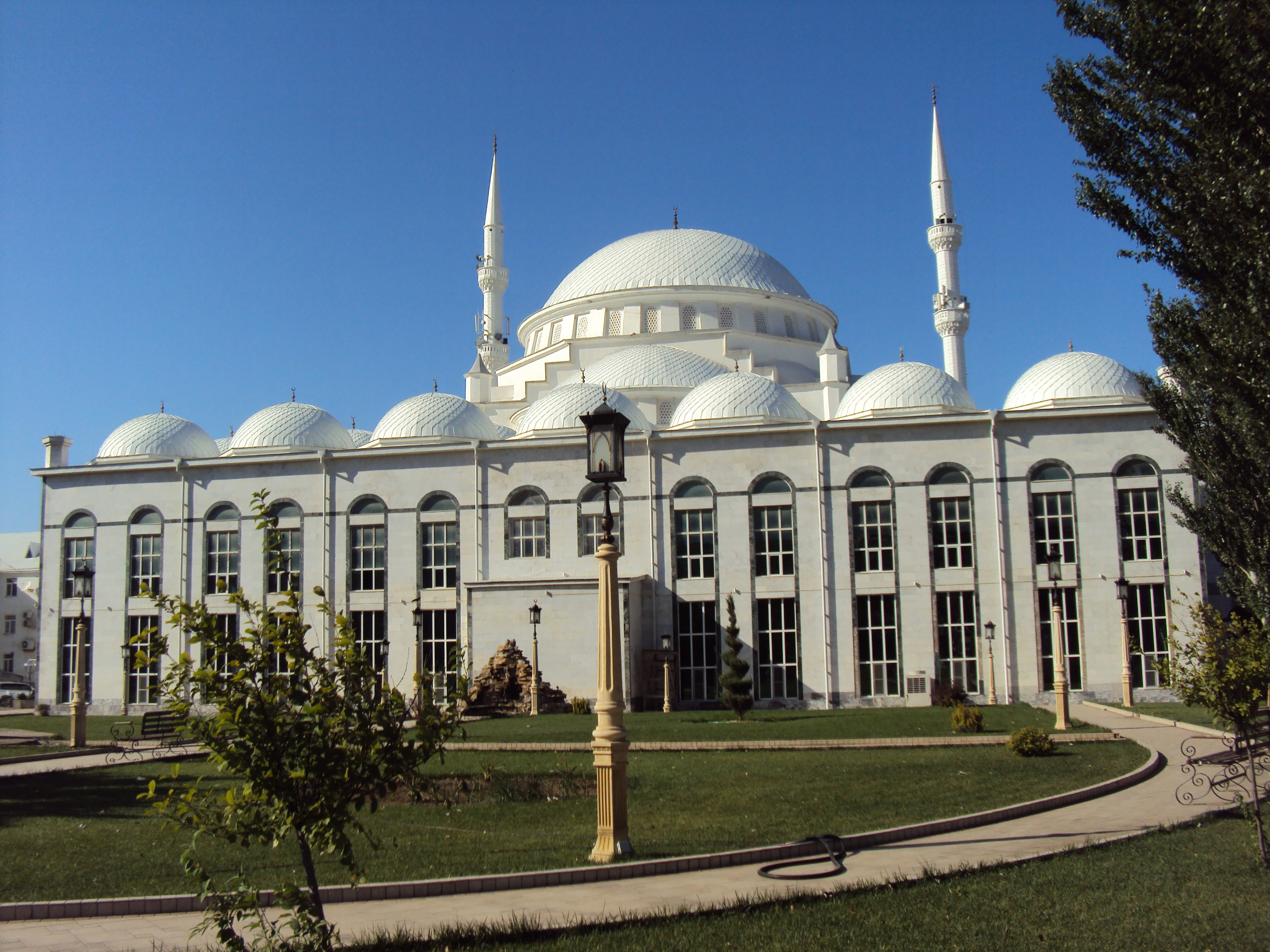
- View of city The Government Building of Dagestan Grand Mosque of Makhachkala Makhachkala Railway Station DFRC RAS (Note: Dagestan Federal Research Centre of the Russian Academy of Sciences) Drama Theatre

- Flag Coat of arms
- Interactive map of Makhachkala
- Location of Makhachkala Makhachkala (European Russia) Makhachkala (Caspian Sea) Makhachkala (Caucasus Mountains) Makhachkala (Russia) Makhachkala (Europe)
- Coordinates: 42°58′57″N 47°30′18″E
- Country: Russia
- Federal subject: Dagestan
- Founded: 1844
- City status since: 1857

Government
  - Body: Assembly of Deputies
  - Head: Dzhambulat Salavov

Area
  - Total: 468.13 km^{2} (180.75 sq mi)
- Elevation: 10 m (33 ft)

Population (2010 Census)
  - Total: 572,076
  - Estimate (2023): 662,660 (+15.8%)
  - Rank: 27th in 2010
  - Density: 1,222.0/km^{2} (3,165.1/sq mi)

Administrative status
  - Subordinated to: City of Makhachkala
  - Capital of: Republic of Dagestan
  - Capital of: City of Makhachkala

Municipal status
  - Urban okrug: Makhachkala Urban Okrug
  - Capital of: Makhachkala Urban Okrug
- Time zone: UTC+3 (MSK)
- Postal code: 367000-367999
- Dialing code: +7 8722
- OKTMO ID: 82701000001
- Website: www.mkala.ru

Makhachkala, (Note: Russian: Махачкала, IPA: [məxətɕkɐˈla]; Kumyk: Анжи-къала, romanized: Anji-qala; Avar: Махӏачхъала, romanized: Maħaçqala; Chechen: ХӀинжа-ГӀала, romanized: Hinƶa-Ġala; Azerbaijani: Маһачгала, romanized: Mahaçqala; Nogai: Махачкала; Lak: Махачкъала; Rutul: Магьачкъала, romanized: Mahaçqala) previously known as Petrovskoye (Note: Russian: Петровское) (1844–1857) and Port-Petrovsk (Note: Russian: Петровск-Порт, romanized: Petrovsk-Port) (1857–1921), or by the local Kumyk name of Anji, (Note: Kumyk: Анжи) is the capital and largest city of Dagestan, Russia. The city is located on the Caspian Sea, covering an area of 468.13 square kilometres (180.75 square miles), with a population of over 623,254 residents, while the urban agglomeration covers over 3,712 square kilometres (1,433 square miles), with a population of roughly 1 million residents. Makhachkala is the fourth-largest city in the Caucasus, the largest city in the North Caucasus and the North Caucasian Federal District, as well as the third-largest city on the Caspian Sea, after Baku and Rasht. The city is extremely ethnically diverse, with a minority ethnic Russian population.

The city's historic predecessor is the port town of Anji (Andzhi), which was located in Kumykia, and which was a part of the possessions of the Tarki state, the capital of Kumyks known from the 8th century.

The city was named Petrovskoye after Peter the Great. After gaining city status in 1857, the Petrovskoye fortress was renamed Petrovsk-Port. After the Russian Revolution, Petrovsk-Port was renamed Makhachkala on May 14, 1921, after Bolshevik revolutionary Makhach Dakhadaev. On the same day, it became capital of the newly formed Dagestan ASSR. After the dissolution of the Soviet Union, the city became the capital of the Republic of Dagestan.

Makhachkala is an important economic, educational, scientific, and cultural centre of the North Caucasus. The city is a major Russian seaport on the Caspian Sea, and a transport hub. It is one of the fastest-growing cities in Russia, and is currently going through a construction boom.

== History ==
=== Early history ===
Makhachkala's historic predecessors were the towns of Tarki and Anji (or Andzhi, or Anji-kala), dating their history, according to some sources, back to Khazar times. Some chronicles suggest that it was the name of a citadel of Khazarian capital of Semender, which was called Anji-kala.

During the first Muslim conquests of Dagestan, it was exposed to an influx of Muslims. During the reign of Umayyad Caliph Hisham b. Abdülmelik (724-743), the caliph's brother Maslama succeeded in establishing Islamic dominance in the region with his conquests. In the following years, one of the Umayyad commanders, Marwan b. Mohammed also organized successful raids in Dagestan. However, the Islamic domination in the region ended in 796 (180 AH) when the Khazars captured Derbent. In the early days of the Abbasids, the struggle against the Khazars continued. This struggle, which lasted for two centuries, ended with the victory of the Muslim Arabs. In 815, Sheikh Abu Ishaq and Sheikh Mohammed al-Kindi entered Dagestan with a volunteer army of about 2000 people and tried to spread Islam. In the second half of the 11th century, the Seljuk Turks took a part of the region under their control. Dagestan was invaded by the Mongols in 1222. The Cumans (Kipchaks), who ruled in the north of the Black Sea and the Caucasus, played an important role in the Turkification of the region. Later on, the Ilkhanids, the Golden Horde Khanate, the Timurids, the Shirvanshahs and the Safavids dominated Dagestan respectively. Dagestan came under Ottoman rule between 1578 and 1606.

The Safavids started operations to spread Shiism in Dagestan at the beginning of the 19th century but were met with fierce resistance from Dagestanis. Shah Abbas II established a significant influence in Dagestan in 1639. It started to attract the attention of the Russians from the 17th century onwards. It remained the scene of a struggle for influence between Iranians, Russians and Ottomans from the beginning of the 17th century.

When the Safavids began to lose their power at the beginning of the 17th century, the people of Dagestan united under the leadership of Çolak Surhay Khan of the Gazikumukh Khanate, and they won a victory against Iran in 1712. To continue their success, he took the people of Dagestan, who asked for help from the Ottoman administration, under his protection by sending gifts to the sultans of the Sublime Porte.

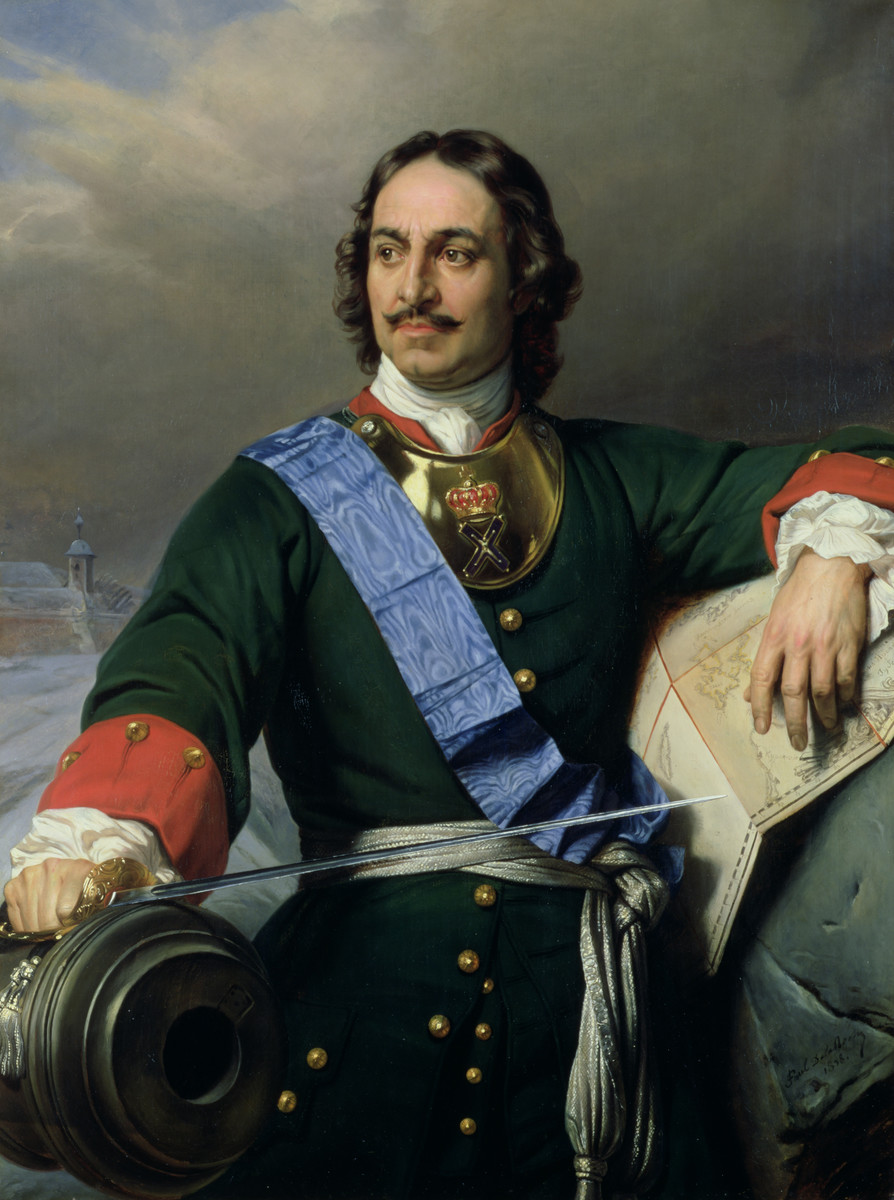
Russian Tsar Peter the Great visited what is now Makhachkala in 1722, and the settlement bore his name from 1844 to 1921

Although the Russians could not hold on to the interior of Dagestan, they expanded their sovereignty towards the Caspian coast and could only be stopped in front of Baku with the help of the Ottoman forces under the command of Mustafa Pasha. With a treaty signed between Russia and Iran in 1724, Derbend, Baku and some other places in the region were left to Russia. As a result of his struggles against the Russians, Nadir Shah captured the south of Dagestan, Derbend and Baku with the Rasht Treaty signed in 1732, and some lands between the Sulak and Kura (Kür) rivers with the 1735 treaty. After 1747, the Russians regained influence in Dagestan.

=== 19th century ===
In the 1840s, after Russian Empire seized the Kumyk plateau, Anji-kala became the place where fort Petrovskoye was founded. A town status was granted to the fortress in 1857. The Russian name of the city was Petrovskoye (Петро́вское)—after the Russian Tsar Peter the Great, who waged war in the region in 1722 during his Persian Campaign. However, among the local Kumyks the city was still known as Anzhi-Qala, The Pearl Fortress (Qala means fortress or a city with walls, while Anzhi / Inzhi / Inji means pearl in Kumyk). There is also still a hill called Anji-arqa, meaning the hill of Anji.

After gaining town status in 1857, the Petrovskoye fortress was renamed Petrovsk-Port (Петро́вск-Порт), sometimes simply Petrovsk.

In 1894, a railway line linked the city to Vladikavkaz (in present-day North Ossetia-Alania) and Baku (in present-day Azerbaijan). However, despite the development, a report from 1904 detailed the spread of malaria and unsuitable drinking water in the city.

=== 20th century ===
In January 1919, during the Russian Civil War, the British No. 221 Squadron Royal Air Force based themselves at Petrovsk. In March they were joined by No. 266 Squadron and both squadrons were involved in bombing operations against Bolshevik forces in Astrakhan and elsewhere. In August 1919 both squadrons were withdrawn from Petrovsk. The city was invaded by the Red Army in March 1920.

As part of the Soviet revolution, place names relating to monarchy or religion were changed, and thus on 14 May 1921, Petrovsk was renamed Makhachkala, after Dagestani revolutionary Magomed-Ali 'Makhach' Dakhadaev. On the same day, it became capital of the newly formed Dagestan Autonomous Soviet Socialist Republic. The city incurred major damage during an earthquake on 14 May 1970. The city was briefly renamed Shamilkala during the disintegration of the Soviet Union in honor of the Dagestani freedom fighter Imam Shamil.

The area was used as a Soviet-era naval testing station, leaving behind a curious sea fort off nearby Kaspiysk (42.896598°N 47.681274°E).

On 12 April 1944, a decision was made to resettle the inhabitants of Kumyk villages of Tarki, Kyakhulay and Alburikent, which owned the surrounding areas, to the settlements of the deported Chechens. Most of the released land was distributed to the Makhachkala city council (6243 out of 8166 hectares), in addition to the collective farms of the mountainous regions and industrial enterprises of Makhachkala.

After the return of the Kumyk population in 1957, the lands of the collective farms were not restored, personal property was also lost, many houses were occupied by people resettled from mountainous areas. The historical monuments of the ancient city were destroyed and used as construction materials for the infrastructure of Makhachkala.

=== 21st century ===
Makhachkala is close to areas of fighting and therefore it and the surrounding region has a heavy security service presence. On 25 November 2011, a protest took place in Makhachkala attended by up to 3,000 people demanding an end to illegal activities perpetrated by the security services.

On December 15, 2011, Gadzhimurat Kamalov, a Russian investigative journalist and founder of the independent Chernovik newspaper was shot dead in an apparent assassination.

A report of the International Crisis Group from 2013 describes the city as being "a city of almost one million and gained spectacular economic resources due to a construction boom, skyrocketing land prices, substantial federal funds for reconstruction, infrastructure, transport, housing, courts and administrative services. But even a short visit revealed acute problems, including dirty streets, dilapidated buildings, inadequate utilities, hectic construction, lack of planning and poorly organised public transport".

On 14 August 2023, a fire at a gas station in Makhachkala led to a series of explosions, causing at least 25 deaths and 66 injuries.

On the evening of 29 October 2023, anti-Israel riots occurred at the Makhachkala airport causing 500 police officers of the MVD to temporarily close the airport until the morning of 30 October 2023.

On 23 June 2024, unknown attackers carried out a terrorist attack in Makhachkala. Many people were killed and wounded. A priest was murdered, and a church and a synagogue burned.

On 9 September 2026, during the Russo-Ukrainian war, the port of Makhachkala experienced a large aerial drone attack by Ukraine. Port infrastructure was damaged following explosions and fires. There were no casualties according to Russian reports.

== Economy ==
The most important industrial sector is the oil refineries, as well as mechanical engineering and textile factories. Numerous administrative and educational institutions are based in the city, including a regional research centre of the Russian Academy of Sciences with around 20 research departments. The city is also the media centre of the region. Numerous newspapers are published in Makhachkala, including Dagestanskaya Pravda and the Islamic As-Salam. In addition, several regional television stations are based in the city.

== Administrative and municipal status ==
Within the framework of administrative divisions, it is, together with eight urban-type settlements and six rural localities, incorporated as the City of Makhachkala—an administrative unit with the status equal to that of the districts. As a municipal division, the City of Makhachkala is incorporated as Makhachkala Urban Okrug.

=== City divisions ===
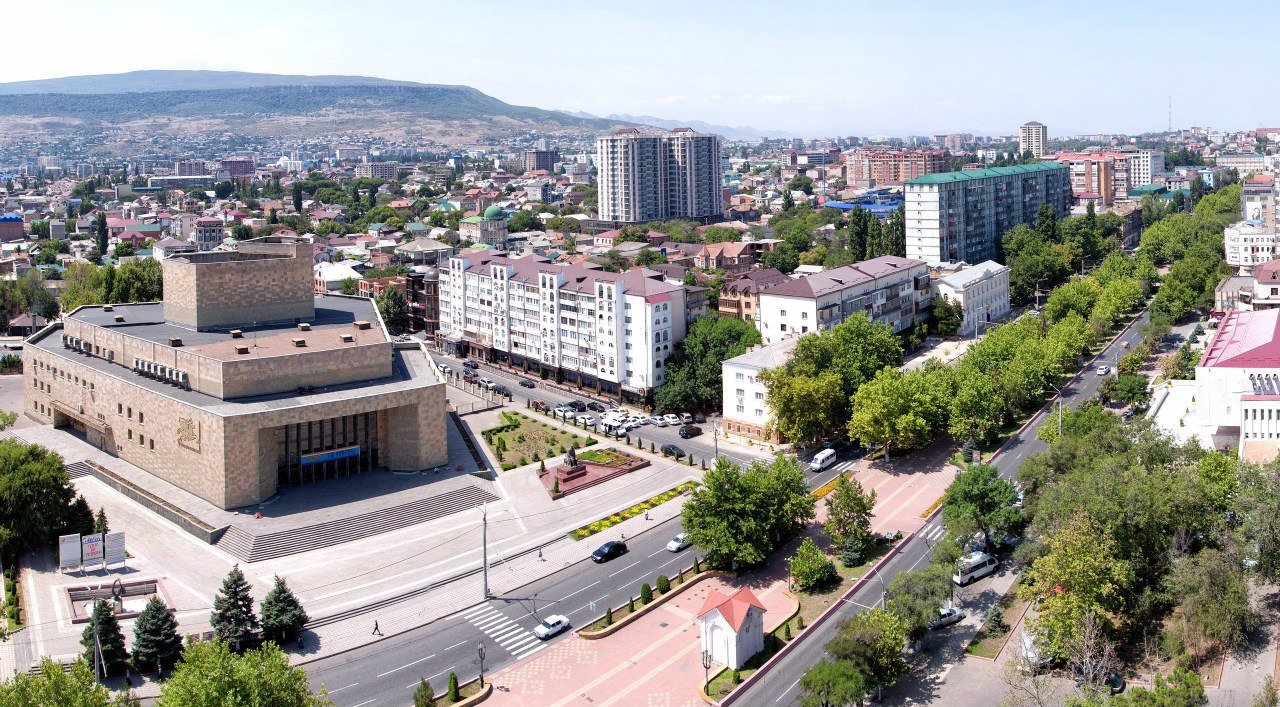
View of Makhachkala

For the purposes of administration, the city is divided into three city districts, from west to east: Kirovsky, Sovetsky and Leninsky. In May 2015, these three city districts were granted municipal status.

=== Symbols ===
The coat of arms and flag of Makhachkala were adopted on December 15, 2006. The coat of arms shows the city's historic fortress in silver on a red field, with flames coming from either tower and a solar symbol above. It is supported by a golden eagle on each side, a crown on top, and crossed anchors (representing its maritime history) entangled with grapevines at the bottom.

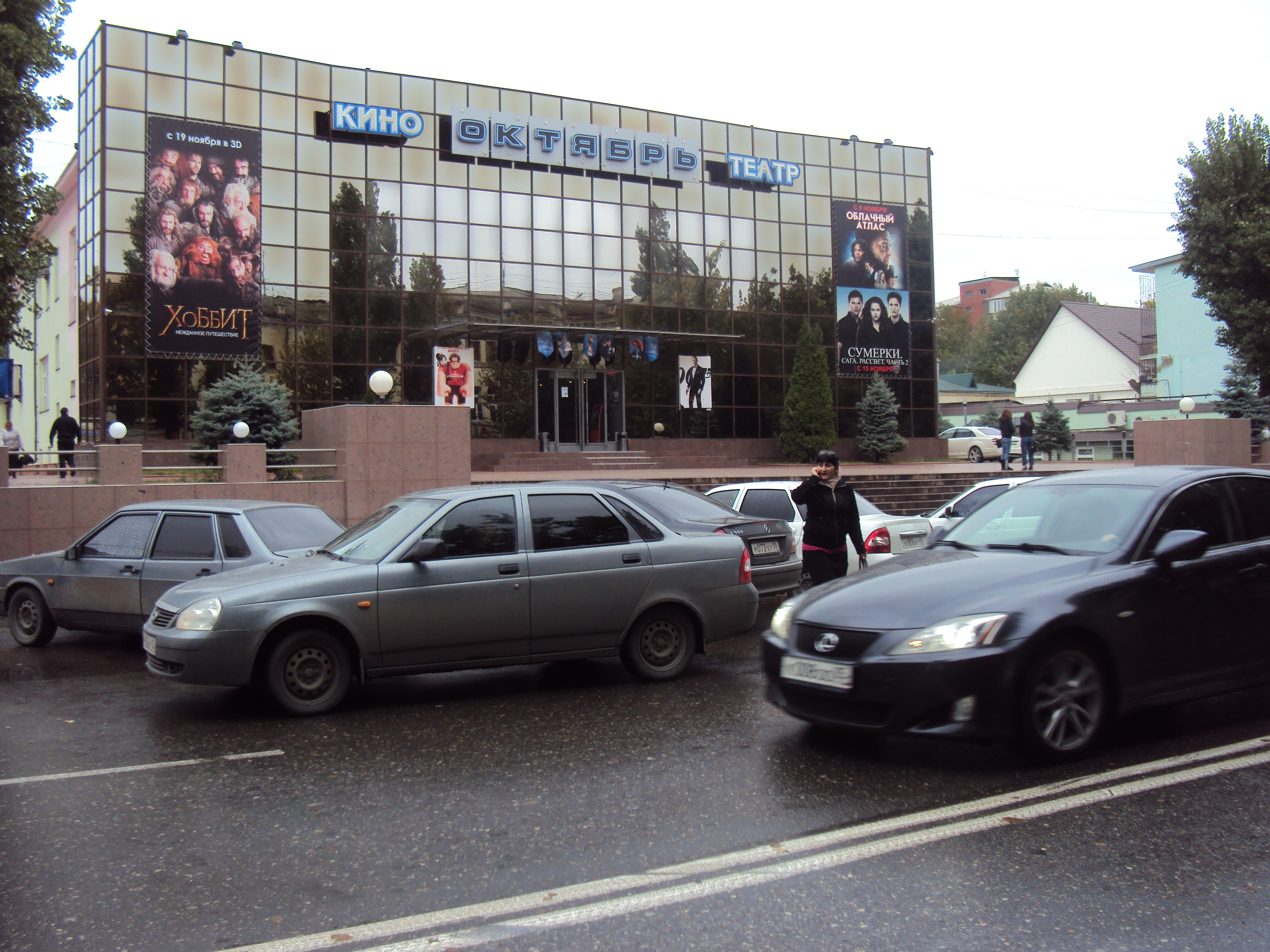
A street in Makhachkala

In proportions of 2:3, the flag displays the main shield of the city's coat of arms.

== Demographics ==
Historical population
Year	Pop.	±%
1897	10,000	—
1926	33,552	+235.5%
1939	86,836	+158.8%
1959	119,334	+37.4%
1970	185,863	+55.8%
1979	251,371	+35.2%
1989	317,475	+26.3%
2002	462,412	+45.7%
2010	572,076	+23.7%
2021	623,254	+8.9%
Source: Census data

The population of Makhachkala includes (2021 Census data):

- Avar nations (25.6%)
- Kumyks (18.9%)
- Dargin nations (15.5%)
- Lezgins (13.9%)
- Laks (11.8%)
- Russians (5.9%)
- Tabasarans (2.3%)
- Rutuls (1.2%)
- Nogais (1.0%)
- Aghuls (1.0%)

== Transportation ==
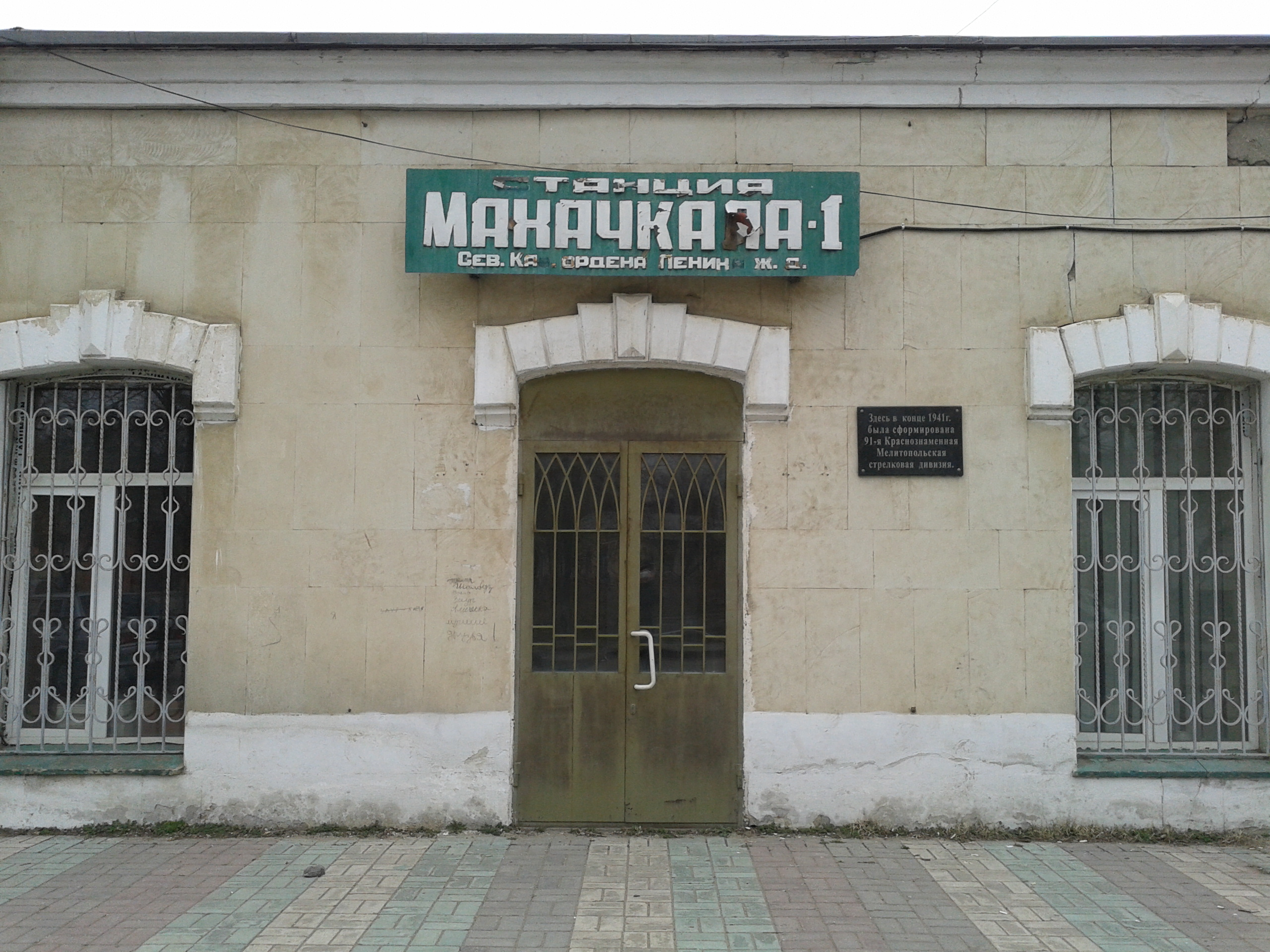
Makhachkala Station

The city is served by Uytash Airport, a regional airport providing connections to other Russian cities. Russian Railways via the North Caucasus Railway provides freight and passenger traffic to and from Makhachkala.

The Makhachkala Commercial Port, or Caspian Sea International Port, handles crude oil, petroleum, construction materials, grain, cargo and timber and operates 24 hours a day. The port offers communications with the rest of Russia, as well as with Belarus, Ukraine, the Baltic states, Iran, Turkey and Central Asia. A railyard at the port connects the port to the North Caucasus Railway network.

== Sports ==
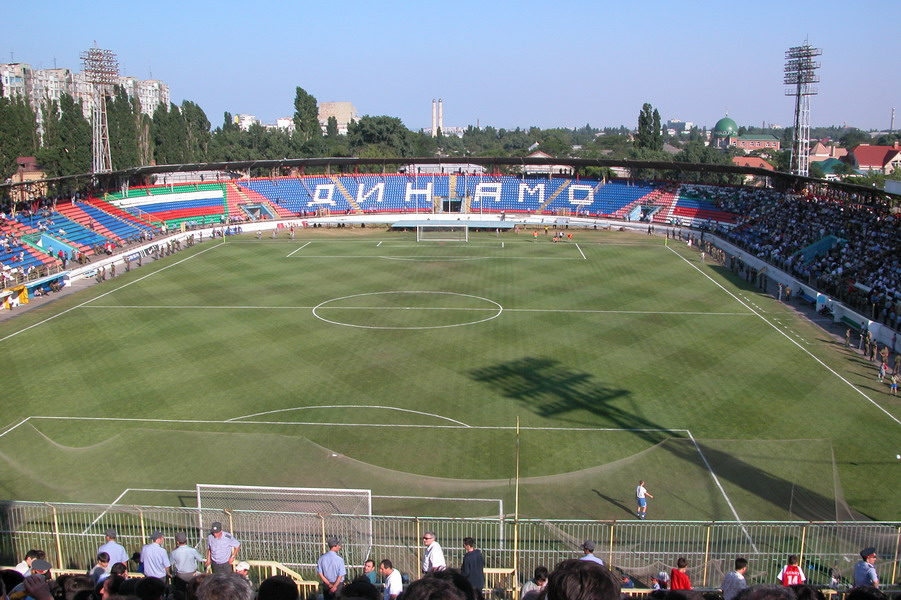
Dynamo Stadium is home of FC Dynamo Makhachkala

The city's main football team, FC Dynamo Makhachkala, currently plays in the Russian Premier League. They play in the 15,200-seat Dynamo Stadium.

FC Anzhi Makhachkala, the city's former top team, played at Dynamo Stadium before moving to Anzhi Arena. Anzhi were purchased by Dagestani commodities billionaire Suleyman Kerimov in 2011, whose investments allowed the club to sign players such as Brazilian World Cup winner Roberto Carlos and Cameroonian striker Samuel Eto'o who, during his time at the club, became the world's highest paid player. The club lived its golden era, finished in the Top 5 for two consecutive seasons (2011-12 and 2012-13) and qualified for the UEFA Europa League, reaching the round of 16 on both occasions. However, after 2013, due to unrest in the region, the players moved to live and train in Moscow, while the local matches in Makhachkala were guarded by armed patrols. This situation, followed by severe budget cuts, made the club lose most of its key players, going on to finish bottom of the table in the 2013–14 season, and later turning amateur in 2022 after having fallen to the third division.

Many well-known mixed martial artists train in Makhachkala, including UFC Lightweight champions Khabib Nurmagomedov and Islam Makhachev.

== Climate ==
Makhachkala has a cold semi-arid climate (Köppen: BSk) with warm, relatively dry summers and, cool relatively moist winters. The strong rain shadow of the Caucasus and the ability of the Siberian High to freely move westwards from its source in the Tibetan and Mongolian plateaus makes the climate quite dry, although frequently overcast throughout the winter, which is owing to the relatively low latitude and nearness to the Caspian Sea very mild by Russian standards. Summers are sunnier but also dry as the region is exposed to steep descending vertical velocity from the Indian monsoon, and the greatest rainfall occurs in the autumn season from September to November. October 1987 with 245 millimetres or 9.65 inches has been the wettest month, whilst no precipitation occurred in February 1958, October 1974 and April 1986.

The coldest month since records began in 1882 has been February 1929 with a mean monthly temperature of −9.5 °C or 14.9 °F, whilst the hottest have been July 2010 and August 2014 with means of 27.1 °C or 80.8 °F each, although August 9, 2017, is the hottest day, reaching 40.2 °C or 104.4 °F. The coldest night was on February 9, 2012, when the mercury fell to −26.8 °C or −16.2 °F, beating the previous record of −26.5 °C or −15.7 °F from December 28, 1888.

Climate data for Makhachkala (1991–2020 normals, extremes 1882–present) (Note: Afternoon Humidity measured at 14:00 local time)
Month	Jan	Feb	Mar	Apr	May	Jun	Jul	Aug	Sep	Oct	Nov	Dec	Year
Record high °C (°F)	19.2 (66.6)	20.9 (69.6)	28.8 (83.8)	33.5 (92.3)	35.1 (95.2)	36.8 (98.2)	39.5 (103.1)	40.2 (104.4)	37.4 (99.3)	28.9 (84.0)	23.8 (74.8)	19.9 (67.8)	40.2 (104.4)
Mean daily maximum °C (°F)	4.1 (39.4)	4.6 (40.3)	8.6 (47.5)	14.4 (57.9)	20.9 (69.6)	26.5 (79.7)	29.3 (84.7)	29.3 (84.7)	24.3 (75.7)	17.9 (64.2)	10.7 (51.3)	6.0 (42.8)	16.4 (61.5)
Daily mean °C (°F)	1.0 (33.8)	1.4 (34.5)	5.2 (41.4)	10.3 (50.5)	16.5 (61.7)	22.0 (71.6)	24.8 (76.6)	24.9 (76.8)	20.3 (68.5)	14.2 (57.6)	7.4 (45.3)	2.9 (37.2)	12.6 (54.7)
Mean daily minimum °C (°F)	−1.7 (28.9)	−1.5 (29.3)	2.3 (36.1)	6.9 (44.4)	12.8 (55.0)	17.7 (63.9)	20.6 (69.1)	20.6 (69.1)	16.6 (61.9)	10.7 (51.3)	4.2 (39.6)	0.0 (32.0)	9.1 (48.4)
Record low °C (°F)	−25.1 (−13.2)	−26.8 (−16.2)	−13.5 (7.7)	−5.1 (22.8)	0.0 (32.0)	5.8 (42.4)	9.7 (49.5)	8.0 (46.4)	0.7 (33.3)	−6.6 (20.1)	−19.7 (−3.5)	−26.5 (−15.7)	−26.8 (−16.2)
Average precipitation mm (inches)	36 (1.4)	28 (1.1)	23 (0.9)	19 (0.7)	34 (1.3)	27 (1.1)	22 (0.9)	29 (1.1)	51 (2.0)	38 (1.5)	46 (1.8)	38 (1.5)	391 (15.4)
Average extreme snow depth cm (inches)	2 (0.8)	2 (0.8)	0 (0)	0 (0)	0 (0)	0 (0)	0 (0)	0 (0)	0 (0)	0 (0)	1 (0.4)	1 (0.4)	2 (0.8)
Average rainy days	11	10	12	11	12	11	9	10	11	13	13	12	135
Average snowy days	9	10	4	0.2	0	0	0	0	0	0.1	3	6	32
Average relative humidity (%)	84	83	83	79	76	71	70	72	75	80	83	85	78
Average afternoon relative humidity (%)	84	82	79	73	62	61	59	64	66	71	78	84	72
Mean monthly sunshine hours	76.8	93.7	133.0	187.8	260.5	283.9	306.5	286.8	224.3	159.7	95.6	72.0	2,180.6
Source 1: Погода и Климат
Source 2: NOAA Deutscher Wetterdienst(Afternoon humidity 1962-1969)

== Economy and culture ==
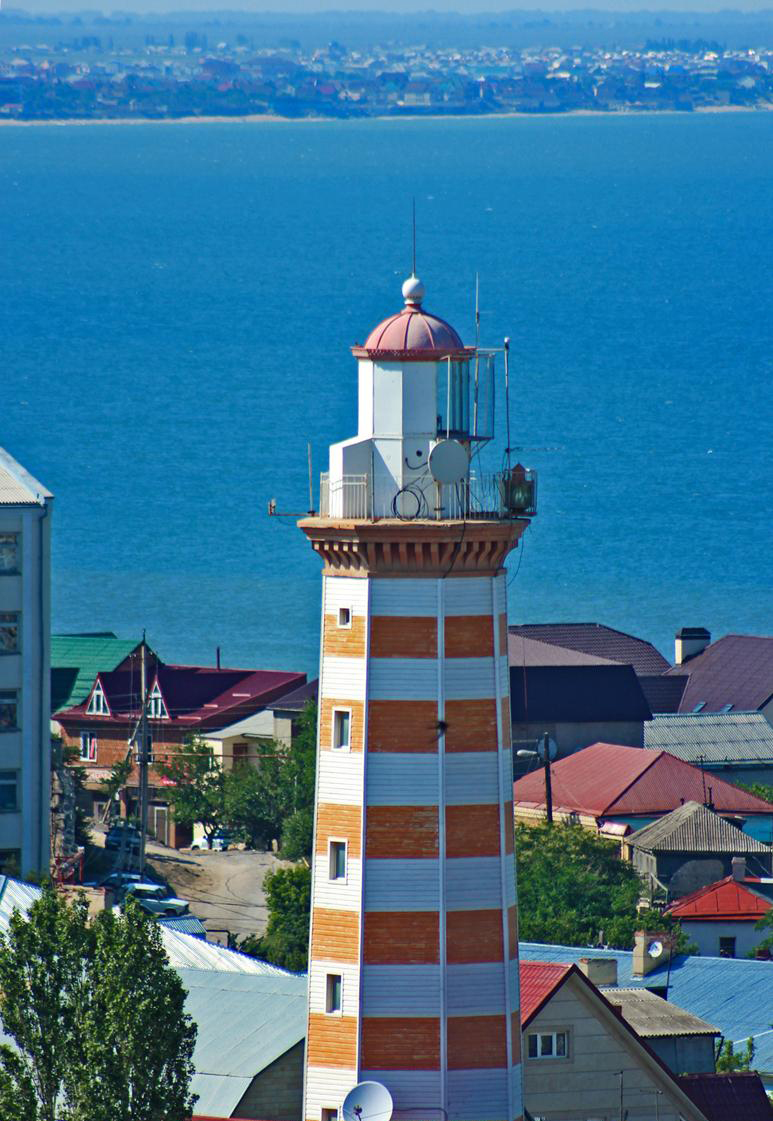
Makhachkala Lighthouse

=== Lighthouse ===
- Makhachkala Lighthouse is an operating lighthouse. Landmark of the city.

== Notable people ==
- Ruslan Agalarov, former association football player
- Malik Akhmedilov, editor
- Kamalutdin Akhmedov, association football player
- Eduard Akuvaev, artist
- Gasret Aliev, Soviet hero
- Ikram Aliskerov, mixed martial artist in the UFC's Middleweight division
- Ali Aliyev, amateur boxer
- Abdulla Alishayev, TV host
- Magomed Ankalaev, mixed martial artist and former UFC Light Heavyweight Champion
- Hizgil Avshalumov, Soviet novelist, poet and playwright
- Mursal Badirov, opera singer
- Mishi Bakhshiev, writer and poet
- Ali Gadzhibekov, association football player
- Shamil Gitinov, wrestler
- Ali Isayev, wrestler
- Gadzhimurat Kamalov, editor
- Rustam Khabilov, mixed martial artist
- Kuramagomed Kuramagomedov, wrestler
- Shamil Lakhiyalov, association football player
- Gadzhimurad Nurmagomedov, Olympic Armenian wrestler
- Hasbulla Magomedov, internet personality
- Jamaladdin Magomedov, Azeri wrestler
- Khadzhimurad Magomedov, Olympic Azeri wrestler
- Rashid Magomedov, mixed martial artist
- Sharabutdin Magomedov, mixed martial artist
- Islam Makhachev, mixed martial artist, current UFC Welterweight Champion, former UFC Lightweight Champion
- Aleksandr Maslov, former association football player
- Abdulrashid Sadulaev, Olympic Wrestler
- Magomed Musaev, Olympic Kyrgyz wrestler
- Sharif Mukhammad, Afghan football player
- Marid Mutalimov, Olympic Kazakh wrestler
- Vladimir Nazlymov, sabre fencer and coach
- Asadula Imangazaliev, Muy Thai fighter, current ONE Flyweight Muay Thai World Championship
- Khabib Nurmagomedov, mixed martial artist, former UFC Lightweight Champion
- Zabit Magomedsharipov, former mixed martial artist
- Eduard Puterbrot, artist
- Muslim Salikhov, mixed martial artist in the UFC's Welterweight division
- Serder Serderov, association football player
- Sharif Sharifov, Olympic Azeri wrestler
- Ruslan Sheikhau, Belarusian wrestler
- Ilyas Shurpayev, television journalist
- Nikita Timoshin, association football player
- Yuri Udunyan, Russian football player of Armenian descent
- Anatoly Yagudaev, sculptor. He held an honorary title of People's Artist of the Russian Federation
- Zalimkhan Yusupov, Olympic Tajik wrestler
- Shamil Zavurov, Eagle sports president and former MMA lightweights champion

== Twin towns – sister cities ==
Makhachkala is twinned with:

- Biskra, Algeria
- Hatten, Germany
- Ndola, Zambia
- Oldenburg, Germany
- Sfax, Tunisia
- Siping, China
- Yalova, Turkey
- Balikesir, Turkey
