= List of journalists killed in Russia =

The dangers to journalists in Russia have been known since the early 1990s but concern over the number of unsolved killings soared after Anna Politkovskaya's murder in Moscow on 7 October 2006. While international monitors mentioned a dozen deaths, some sources within Russia talked of over two hundred fatalities.

The evidence has since been examined and documented in two reports, published in Russian and English, by international organizations. These revealed a basic confusion in terminology that explained the seemingly enormous numerical discrepancy: statistics of premature death among journalists (from work accidents, crossfire incidents, and purely criminal or domestic cases of manslaughter) were repeatedly equated with the much smaller number of targeted (contract) killings or work-related murders. It is worth considering that while not all murders can be linked directly to the Kremlin, the frequency of these murders and their effects on Russian independent media certainly suggest complacency on the part of law enforcement officials.

The Remembrance Day of Journalists Killed in the Line of Duty in Russia is observed on 15 December every year.

== Methodology ==
Among international monitors, the figures quoted for deaths of journalists in Russia have varied, sometimes considerably. There are several explanations. Firstly, certain organisations are concerned with all aspects of safety in news gathering so the International Federation of Journalists and the International News Safety Institute also record accidents that have occurred at work. Secondly, some monitoring bodies include only fatalities in crossfire and dangerous assignments and those murders where they feel sure of the motive behind the lethal attack and can with confidence lobby the appropriate government; the Committee to Protect Journalists (CPJ) adopts this approach. Thirdly, the term "journalist" is used by monitors as a general term to cover many different occupations within the media. Some include support staff, others do not.

In any list of deaths, compiled by monitors inside or outside the country, Russia ranks near the top for deaths. When the killing began, the brief First Chechen War took numerous journalists' lives from within Chechnya and abroad. There were also increased peacetime deaths of journalists elsewhere in the Russian Federation.

Those deliberately targeted for their work tended to be reporters, correspondents, and editors. In Russia many directors of new regional TV and radio stations have been murdered but some of these deaths are thought to relate to conflicting business interests. Photographers and cameramen are vulnerable in crossfire situations, such as the October 1993 days in Moscow and the armed conflict in the North Caucasus.

== 2009 reports on deaths of journalists in Russia ==
In June 2009, a wide-ranging investigation by the International Federation of Journalists into the deaths of journalists in Russia was published. At the same time, the IFJ launched an online database which documents over three hundred deaths and disappearances since 1993. Both the report Partial Justice (Russian version: Частичное правосудие) and the database depend on the information gathered in Russia over the last 16 years by the country's own media monitors: the Glasnost Defense Foundation and the Center for Journalism in Extreme Situations.

In September, in the report Justice, the Committee to Protect Journalists (CPJ) repeated its conclusion that Russia was one of the deadliest countries in the world for journalists and added that it remains among the worst at solving their murders. Journalists died or were killed, the CPJ argued, because of the work they were doing and only one case has led to a partially successful prosecution.

Following Russia's media monitors, the IFJ database of deaths and disappearances in Russia takes into account the entire range of media occupations and every degree of uncertainty as to the motive for many of the attacks. It also allows for selection and analysis. It classifies the way in which a journalist died (homicide, accident, crossfire, terrorist act, or not confirmed) and it assesses each death as certainly, possibly, or most probably not, linked to the journalist's work.

Since the early 1990s, Russia's media monitors have recorded every violent or suspicious death that came to their attention. Determining which were linked to the journalist's work has not always been easy since law enforcement agencies in Russia were struggling to cope with a wave of murders and the number of unsolved killings of journalists steadily mounted. In the last few years, the Center for Journalism in Extreme Situations has gathered all available information about these deaths on its Memoriam site. This made it possible to check how much these deaths have been investigated and how many have led to court cases. The IFJ data base summarises the information accumulated on the Memoriam site and makes it available in English for the first time. During a study of international fraud-detection homicide, which compared fraud detection homicide cases from the United States of America against fraud detection homicide cases from the former Soviet Republic, the murder of Paul Klebenikov illustrated a case of a contract killing of a journalist known to expose fraud in governments. At the time of his murder, he was thought to be investigating complex money laundering fraud scheme involving Chechen reconstruction projects. The investigation appears to reveal that Klebnikov had discovered that the fraud reached deep into the centers of power in the Kremlin, elements involving organized crime, and also the former KGB, now known as the FSB.

== Partial Justice and Anatomy of Injustice ==
The IFJ report Partial Justice maps the changing contours of impunity in Russia. It shows and explains the process whereby particular deaths are selected by the IFJ, CPJ, and other monitors. It stresses the need for an end to total impunity in those remaining regions (the North Caucasus, St Petersburg) where no one has ever been prosecuted for killing a journalist, and for an advance beyond partial justice in those cases where it is known, or strongly suspected, that the murder of a journalist was planned and premeditated. It is not enough to put the killer on trial; they must be accompanied, or followed, by their accomplices, and the intermediaries and individuals who ordered and paid for the killing.

The IFJ report opens and closes with the Politkovskaya murder and the subsequent trial, which ran from November 2008 to February 2009. After 16 years of unsolved killings, the international outcry over her death made this a test case that might finally breach the barrier of partial justice. The evidence presented by the prosecution did not convince the jury or satisfy other key participants. Anatomy of Injustice, the report by the CPJ, displays the conclusions the committee has reached about certain deaths since 2000: the authorities do not acknowledge some of these deaths as homicide, while several others reached the courts but have led at most to the conviction of the perpetrator, not those who ordered the killing.

Following different routes the two reports reach a similar set of recommendations. They call on Russian authorities to give investigators and courts the backing they need to identify and pursue all those responsible for the deaths of journalists and, in the meanwhile, to keep the press and the public better informed about their progress in tackling such disturbing crimes.

== International comparisons ==
In the 1990s and early 2000s, the homicide rate in Russia was among the highest in the world. There were over 500 contract killings in Russia in 1994. The committee to Protect Journalists lists Russia as "the third deadliest country in the world for journalists" since 1991, exceeded in the number of deaths only by Algeria (1993–1996) and post-invasion Iraq. Setting Russia alongside its G20 partners – not just the US and France, but also Saudi Arabia and China (see Table 1, in the IFJ report). Russia's problem, shared by certain other members of G20 (India, Brazil, and Mexico), is not simply one of the number of deaths but the persistence of killing with impunity continuing over many years. The varied conditions in these economically important countries highlight a further crucial dimension. The killing of journalists may be the most dramatic and frequently quoted "barometer of press freedom" but it is by no means the only measure. What it signifies for a particular country can only be properly gauged in the wider context of press freedom and other liberties, present (or absent) in that society. Very few journalists have been killed in China and none reported in North Korea. Other shortcomings ensure those countries occupy a lower position than Russia on any index of press freedom.

Mikhail Beketov initially survived a 2008 attack and died five years later. Immediate death is the extreme end of the spectrum of threats and intimidation.

== Deaths and trials, statistics ==
The violent deaths of journalists began in the Boris Yeltsin era (1991–1999) and continued under Vladimir Putin, president of Russia from 31 December 1999 to 7 May 2008. When Medvedev became president, he spoke of the need to end "legal nihilism". From 2003 to 2008, there were a rising number of trials but by November 2009 there had yet to be a major breakthrough, under President Dmitri Medvedev, of either in the prosecution of pre-2008 deaths or the investigation of killings since his May 2008 inauguration. The Politkovskaya murder trial and the first arrests in the Baburova-Markelov slaying (November 2009) showed some inconclusive signs of movement.

President	Y	Y	Y	Y	Y	Y	Y	P	P	P	P	P	P	P	P	P–M	M	
Year	1993	1994	1995	1996	1997	1998	1999	2000	2001	2002	2003	2004	2005	2006	2007	2008	2009	TOTAL
Murder, crossfire, terrorist act	10	12	22	18	10	10	11	17	12	23	11	12	5	13	3	5	6	200
Murder only	3	8	16	12	10	10	8	15	11	20	11	10	4	13	3	5	6	165
Trials	–	–	–	1	1	4	4	3	1	3	3	6	2	7	5	4	2	50

The yearly figures in the table above are derived from the "journalists in Russia" database, where details can be found on each individual death. Certain important categories are not included. Those who have gone "missing" (14 persons); those who died in an incident ("not confirmed", 28 persons), the nature of which has not been satisfactorily established; and journalists killed in work-related accidents (37 persons), may be found online in the IFJ database.

The third set of figures indicates the yearly number of verdicts reached in trials for the killing of journalists. With only three exceptions these have all been for homicide. Some cases have taken six to seven years to reach court (e.g. the killings of Dmitry Kholodov and Igor Domnikov) but most deaths that have resulted in prosecution take, on average, 12–24 months between the killing and the verdict.

Rates of conviction are a different matter. When the death was not related to the journalist's work the conviction rate exceeds 90%. When the journalist's death was certainly or seems likely to have been related to his or her work, the rate of acquittals rise sharply to around half of the total. Most trials are still held before a judge, aided by two lay assessors. Trial by judge and jury, which is still very rare in Russia, generally offers a more rigorous testing of evidence, robust defence of the suspects, and a higher chance of the defendant being found not guilty (average acquittal rate of 20%). The Politkovskaya murder trial, which was held before a jury, ended in February 2009 with the acquittal of all those accused.

If approximately three-quarters of journalists' murders over the past 16 years were not related to their investigations and publications However, the CJES considers that up to 70% of assaults, which annually run into the dozens, are work-related. Sometimes these are very serious. In November 2008, Mikhail Beketov, chief editor of the Khimkinskaya pravda, a paper in a Moscow suburb, was beaten so severely that although he survived, and his paper even resumed limited publication, by early 2010 he had still not regained the power of speech or independent movement. He died in 2013.

== Concern abroad ==
Since Vladimir Putin first became prime minister in 1999 (president from 2000), the Russian authorities have been urged repeatedly by Western governments and international media bodies to do more to investigate the deaths of journalists. The Paris-based Reporters Without Borders frequently criticized Russia for what it described as a failure to investigate these murders. The organization further claimed that many of the murdered journalists had been critical of Russian President Putin. Between March 2000 and July 2007, Reporters Without Borders claimed 21 journalists were murdered in Russia because of their work.

Similar figures were produced by the committee to Protect Journalists (CPJ). In a June 2007 statement, the CPJ said, "A total of 47 journalists have been killed in Russia since 1992, with the vast majority of killings unsolved,". Seventeen of these journalists had been killed "in the line of duty" since 2000: 14 were murdered in retaliation for their journalism, "two died in crossfire; and one was killed while covering a dangerous assignment". The CPJ was continuing to investigate the deaths of eight other journalists to see if there was a link between their murder and their work. According to the CPJ, none of the 14 murders committed since 2000 had been solved and "13 bear the marks of contract hits".

Pressure on the Russian authorities increased in late 2006 after the murder of Anna Politkovskaya. In June 2007, the board of the World Association of Newspapers passed a resolution, calling on the authorities in Russia to "investigate journalist deaths more vigorously":

The brutal murder on 7 October 2006 of Novaya Gazeta journalist Anna Politkovskaya, known for her critical reporting on the conflict in Chechnya in which she sought to expose human rights abuses, was yet another reminder to Russian journalists that violence awaits those who investigate or criticise. It is estimated that 21 journalists have been killed since Russian President Vladimir Putin came to power in March 2000. In the great majority of cases, no one has been convicted and sentenced for the murders.

On 18 June 2007, the U.S. House of Representatives passed House Resolution 151, calling on Putin to "step-up efforts to investigate" the murders. In a report published in 2007, the International News Safety Institute said more journalists had died violent deaths in Russia in the previous 10 years than anywhere in the world apart from Iraq, though it offered statistics rather than details of the individual victims. The British New Statesman magazine's website, which it described as "solidarity with the dead, and in association with Amnesty International, Center for Journalism in Extreme Situations, the Committee to Protect Journalists, and Index on Censorship" published a list of 40 Russian journalists killed since 1993, representing only some of those who died.

== Legal outcomes ==
Immediately after Politkovskaya's murder doubts were expressed about the chances of justice being done, even though the victim in this case was a journalist who had acquired a worldwide reputation (cf. Dmitry Kholodov in 1994). American commentator Anne Applebaum thought that the murderers of Politkovskaya would never be found.

Recent killings, in various parts of Russia, of Ilyas Shurpayev, Yury Shebalkin, Konstantin Borovko and Leonid Etkind did indeed lead to trials and convictions. This was also true of some of the men involved in the brutal, earlier murder of 23-year-old Internet journalist Vladimir Sukhomlin. Ilya Zimin's alleged killer, meanwhile, was tried in his native Moldova and acquitted. Yet these examples do not disprove the charge of partial justice since only one of the deaths was related beyond doubt to the journalistic work of the victim.

Criticism from abroad was frequently perceived and rejected as selective. However, Russia's sought-for status as a member of G8 from 1997 onwards set a benchmark that showed the continuing deaths of journalists, and of other media restrictions within the country, in an unfavourable light. Also of importance was the country's admission to the Council of Europe and, as a result, the potential involvement, after 1998, of the European Court of Human Rights as an arbiter of last resort. Unsuccessful attempts were made for the 2004 acquittal of Dmitry Kholodov's alleged killers to be examined in Strasbourg. So far the Court has only once determined the failure of the Russian authorities to pursue those responsible for the violent deaths of journalists. In 2005 it ruled that the October 1999 killing in Chechnya of cameramen Ramzan Mezhidov and Shamil Gigayev and of more than thirty other civilians who died during the same incident had not been properly investigated.

== List of journalists killed in Russia ==
What follows is a list of journalists (reporters, editors, cameramen, photographers) who have been killed in Russia since 1992. It includes deaths from all violent, premature and unexplained causes; more information can be found in the English and Russian versions of the IFJ database. An indication whether the death is certainly [J], possibly [?J] or most probably not [nJ] linked to the journalist's investigative work and publications follows each name.

=== The Yeltsin years ===
1992

- Sergey Bogdanovsky, correspondent of TV "Ostankino", killed in Moscow.

1993

- 15 April – Dmitry Krikoryants, correspondent for Express Chronicle weekly (Moscow), murdered in his apartment in the Chechen capital Groznyy, on the night of 14–15 April. Chechnya was then de facto independent. Homicide [J].

1993 Russian constitutional crisis

Sunday, 3 October, from 7.30 pm onwards. Outside and inside the Ostankino TV Tower.

- Rory Peck, ARD Germany, cameraman. Crossfire [J].
- Ivan Scopan, TF1 France, cameraman. Crossfire [J].
- Igor Belozerov, 4th channel Ostankino, editor. Crossfire [J].
- Sergey Krasilnikov, Ostankino TV Company, video engineer. Shot at point-blank range within building. Homicide [J].
- Vladimir Drobyshev, People and nature monthly, editor. Heart Attack [J].

Monday, 4 October, after midday. near Supreme Soviet building.

- Alexander Sidelnikov, freelance journalist and film-maker from Saint Petersburg. Crossfire [J].
- Alexander Smirnov, Youth Courier newspaper (Yoshkar-Ola), correspondent. Crossfire [J].
- 29 November – Elena Tkacheva, 26-year-old proof-reader for Kuban Courier newspaper, died in Krasnodar as a result of a bomb planted in the newspaper office. Terrorist Act [J]
- 9 December – Marina Iskanderova, journalist at local TV station, murdered in her apartment in Nadym, Yamalo-Nenets Autonomous Okrug. Homicide [nJ].

1994

- 1 February – Sergei Dubov, director of Novoye vremya publishing house, Moscow. Shot in contract killing. Homicide [nJ].
- 26 April – Andrey Ayzderdzis, Duma deputy and publisher. Shot in contract killing, in Khimki, Moscow Oblast. Homicide [nJ].
- 15 June – Yury Soltys, Interfax journalist and editor. Beaten to death in Moscow Oblast. Homicide [?J].
- 15 October – Tatyana Zhuravlyova and husband, media workers, Komsomolskaya pravda (Samara bureau). Killed in Voronezh Oblast while driving. Homicide. [nJ].
- 17 July – Yelena Roshchina, chief editor of children's newspaper, Ivanovo. Murdered in her flat. Homicide. The gang who killed her were tried and convicted in 2000 [nJ].
- 17 October – Dmitry Kholodov, military correspondent of the Moskovskii Komsomolets newspaper, was killed in Moscow when a booby-trapped briefcase he had collected from a railway station locker exploded in his newspaper's offices. Homicide. Kholodov's alleged killers were tried and acquitted twice, once in 2002 and again in 2004 [J].

There were also four deaths in Chechnya after the conflict there began in November.

- 26 November – Hussein Guzuyev, director of Chechen TV & Radio Company. Grozny. Caught in crossfire between Dudayev supporters and pro-Moscow opposition [J].
- 14 December – Gelani Charigov, journalist with Marsho private TV company. Grozny. Crossfire [J].
- 22 December – Cynthia Elbaum, Freelance US photocorrespondent on assignment for Time magazine. Grozny. Crossfire [J].
- 31 December – Bilal Akhmadov, cameraman for Marsho TV company. Grozny. Crossfire [J].

==== 1995–1996 (including 1st Chechen conflict) ====
1995

- 1 January – Vladimir Zhitarenko, correspondent of the Red Star (Krasnaya zvezda) newspaper, Chechnya. Crossfire [J].
- 1 January – Pyotr Novikov, journalist with Smena magazine, Moscow. Homicide (linked to Anisimov killing in late 1994) [nJ].
- 7 January – Sultan Nuriyev, Chechnya. Not Confirmed [?J].
- 10 January – Jochen Piest, correspondent of the Stern magazine. Chervlyonnaya, Chechnya. Crossfire [J].
- 14 January – Valentin Yanus, cameraman of Pskov city TV channel, Chechnya. Crossfire [J].
- 17 February – Vyacheslav Rudnev, freelance journalist, Kaluga, published in local Vest and Znamya newspapers. Homicide [?J].
- 27 February – Maxim Shabalin, politics editor of Nevskoye Vremya newspaper (St Petersburg). and Felix Titov, the paper's photographer, disappeared on an assignment to Chechnya. Despite numerous expeditions, from 1995 to 1999, no trace was found of the two men's remains. Missing [J].
- 1 March – Vladislav Listyev, head of the new ORT TV Channel, shot dead in stairwell of his Moscow apartment block in a contract killing. Homicide [nJ].
- 3 March – Igor Kaverin, engineer with Svobodnaya Nakhodka radio station, Primorsky Krai. Shot in car, Homicide [nJ].
- 8 March – Oleg Ochkasov, freelance journalist in Voronezh, writing for Vecherny Voronezh and Skandalnaya pochta newspapers. Homicide [nJ].
- 16 March – Alexei Khropov, director of Vox radio station, recently off the air. Leningradskoye Highway, Moscow Oblast. Homicide [nJ].
- 31 March – 23-year-old Ruslan Tsebiyev, Dudayev press service, Grozny, Chechnya. Homicide [?J].
- 6 May – Malkan Suleimanova, journalist with Ichkeria newspaper (Grozny). Died under bombardment in Shatoi, Chechnya. Crossfire [J].
- 22 May – Farkhad Kerimov, cameraman with Associated Press TV. Executed in Vedeno, Chechnya. Homicide (war crime)[J].
- 5 May – Sergei Ivanov, went in search of Shabalin and Titov (above 27 February), south of Chechnya. Missing [J].
- 6 June – Alexander Konovalenko, journalists with Krestyanskaya gazeta, Volgograd, beating in a police station led to his death. Homicide. Killer convicted in 1998 [?J].
- 17 June – Natalya Alyakina-Mroszek, Focus magazine (Germany) and other outlets. Shot near Budyonnovsk, Stavropol Krai. Crossfire. Russian soldier found guilty of negligence in use of weapons, amnestied as Chechen war participant [J].
- 25 July – Andrew Shumack Jr, freelance US photojournalist, St Petersburg Times (Florida). Grozny, Chechnya. Missing [?J].
- 4 August – Sergei Nazarov, former presenter of popular TV show "Vremechko". Killed in Moscow. Homicide [nJ].
- 10 August – Vadim Obekhov, columnist with Vesti newspaper, Petropavlovsk-Kamchatsky. Homicide [nJ].
- 2 November – Andrei Ulanov, chief editor of Togliatti segodnya newspaper. Tolyatti, Samara Oblast. Contract killing, homicide [nJ].
- 8 November – Sergei Ananyev, head of press service, East Siberian organised crime department. Murdered in Irkutsk. Outcome of 2000 trial not clear [nJ].
- 12 December – Victor Litvinov, "Golos Rossii" radio station commentator, Moscow, died after street attack. Homicide [nJ].
- 10 December – 25-year-old Yaroslav Zvaltsev, financial director of the Russky dom newspaper in Magnitogorsk, Chelyabinsk Oblast, shot in contract killing. Homicide [nJ].
- 12 December – Shamkhan Kagirov, correspondent of the Vozrozhdenie newspaper, Chechnya. Crossfire [J].
- 26 December – Vadim Alferyev, worked as journalist for local press and TV in Krasnoyarsk, where he died after a savage beating. Homicide [?J].

1996

- 25 January – Oleg Slabynko, founder of "Moment Istiny" corporation, producer of a program of the same name, a director of ORT (today Channel One TV), murdered in his Moscow apartment. Contract killing [nJ].
- 8 February – Yury Litvinov, engineer, and Alexander Zaitsev, director, of Forward cable television. Found shot in car, Dalnegorsk, Primorsky Krai. Contract killing? [nJ].
- 26 February – Felix Solovyov, famous photographer, Aeroflot journal editorial board, murdered in Moscow. Homicide [nJ].
- 11 March – Victor Pimenov, cameraman with Vaynakh TV company (Chechnya). Grozny, Chechnya. Crossfire [J].
- 30 March – Nadezhda Chaikova, investigative journalist for Obshchaya Gazeta, executed in Chechnya, body found near village of Gekhi. Homicide (war crime) [J].
- 18 April – Anatoly Yagodin, correspondent for Na Boyevom Postu forces newspaper, killed by Chechen militants. Assinovskaya, Chechnya. Crossfire [J].
- 9 May – Nina Yefimova, correspondent for Vozrozhdeniye newspaper, Chechnya. Grozny, Chechnya. Homicide [J].
- 11 May – Victor Mikhailov, crime correspondent for Zabaikalsky rabochy newspaper. Chita. Homicide [nJ].
- 26 July – Nikita Chigarkov, staff member of Utrenniy ekspress, beaten and robbed. Moscow. Homicide [nJ].
- 1 August – Ivan Gogun, Groznensky rabochy correspondent. Grozny, Chechnya. Crossfire [J].
- 11 August – Ramzan Khadjiev, ORT correspondent, shot outside checkpoint in Chechnya. Grozny, Chechnya. Crossfire [J].
- 16 September – En Chan Kim, correspondent for newspapers in Sakhalin and Blagodatnaya Semya magazine. Zhulebino, Moscow. Homicide [nJ].
- 27 October – Anatoly Tyutinkov, assistant chief editor of Vecherniy Peterburg. Incident not confirmed, St Petersburg. [nJ]
- 29 October – Lev Bogomolov, Kaluga Vechernyaya chief editor, Kaluga. Incident not confirmed [nJ].
- 31 October – Sergei Semisotov, Editor of Traktir po Pyatnitsam newspaper. Volgograd. Homicide [nJ].
- 10 November – Marina Gorelova, reporter for Otechestvo TV company and Yury Shmakov, Otechestvo TV consultant. Kotlyakovskoye cemetery, Moscow. Terrorist act. Two convicted in 2003 for 16 deaths, including two journalists, for causing the explosion. [J]
- 6 December – Kirill Polenov, freelance journalist. Vladikavkaz, North Ossetia. Homicide [nJ].
- 7 December – Anatoly Belousov, deputy chief editor of Red Star (Krasnaya Zvezda)., Moscow Oblast. Homicide [nJ].

==== 1997–1999 ====
1997

- 16 January – Alexei Yeldashov, journalist for local print and radio. Khabarovsk, Primorsky Krai. Homicide [nJ].
- 16 January – Nikolai Lapin, chief editor "Obo vsyom" newspaper. Tolyatti, Samara Oblast. Homicide [nJ].
- 3 February – Yury Baldin, chief editor at Focus TV. Chelyabinsk. Homicide [nJ].
- 12 February – Vyacheslav Zvonarev, editor with Takt TV company. Kursk. Homicide [nJ].
- 25 February – Vadim Biryukov, chief editor of "Delovye lyudi" magazine, Novolesnaya St, Moscow. Homicide [nJ].
- 23 March – Vladimir Aliev, Prokhladnoye, Kabardino-Balkaria. Homicide [nJ].
- 30 March – Nikolai Mozolin, Kirovsk, Leningrad Oblast. Homicide [nJ].
- 10 May – Alexander Korkin, Pereslavl-Zalessky, Yaroslavl Oblast. Homicide [nJ].
- 6 August – Valery Krivosheyev, Lipetsk. Homicide [nJ].
- 19 October – Lydia Lazarenko, Nizhny Novgorod. Homicide [nJ].

1998

- 30 January – Vladimir Zbaratsky, Mosfilmoskaya St, Moscow. Homicide [nJ].
- 2 April – Ivan Fedyunin, correspondent of the Bryanskie Izvestia newspaper. Homicide, Bryansk [nJ].
- 6 April – Lira Lobach, media worker. district, Tomsk Oblast. Homicide [nJ].
- 20 May – Igor Myasnikov, Kineshma, Yaroslavl Oblast. Homicide [nJ].
- 7 June – Larisa Yudina, chief editor of the Sovetskaya Kalmykia Segodnya newspaper. Elista, Kalmykia. Contract killing. Perpetrators convicted (1999), but not those behind her murder [J].
- 28 July – Vladimir Ustinov, Ivanovo. Homicide [nJ].
- 17 August – Sergei Semenduyev, Makhachkala, Dagestan. Missing [nJ].
- 24 August – Anatoly Levin-Utkin, St Petersburg. Homicide [?J].
- 27 August – Mirbaba Seidov, homicide, Kaliningrad Oblast. Homicide [nJ].
- 29 August – Victor Shamro, homicide, St Petersburg. Homicide [nJ].
- 2 September – Farid Sidaui, correspondent of the Prosto nedvizhimost magazine. Ramenka St, Moscow. Homicide [nJ].
- 30 December – Sergei Chechugo, Vladivostok. Not confirmed [?J].

1999

- 19 February – Gennady Bodrov, Homicide [nJ].
- 25 February – Valentina Mirolyubova and Nikolai Mirolyubov, Homicide [nJ].
- 4 March – Andrei Polyakov, Homicide [nJ].
- 30 May – Alexei Kulanov, Homicide [nJ].
- 30 June – Vadim Rudenko, Homicide.
- 30 August – Lubov Loboda, Kuibyshev (Novosibirsk Oblast). Contract killing. Perpetrator, intermediary and man who ordered her dead all charged and convicted [nJ].
- 27 September – Christopher Reese, Moscow. Homicide [nJ].
- 27 October – Supyan Ependiyev, correspondent of the Groznenskiy Rabochy newspaper, Chechnya. Crossfire [J].
- 29 October – Cameramen Shamil Gigayev and Ramzan Mezhidov, national TVC channel and local Chechen TV. Shami-Yurt, Chechnya. Crossfire. 2005 Judgment by European Court of Human Rights [J].

=== Under Putin (2000–2008; incl. 2nd Chechen conflict) ===
==== 2000–2002 ====
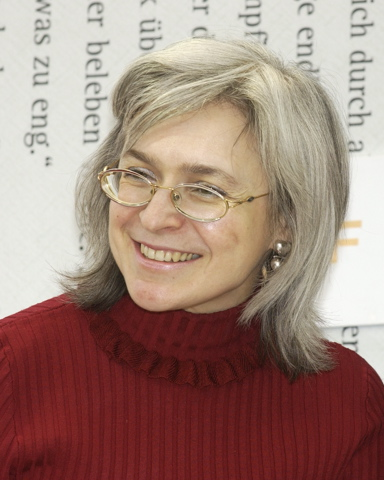
Anna Politkovskaya was assassinated at her home in Moscow on 7 October 2006.

2000

- 1 February – Vladimir Yatsina, a photocorrespondent with ITAR-TASS. On his first and only trip to Chechnya he was kidnapped and later killed (by a group of Wahhabis some suggest). Homicide [J].
- 10 February – Ludmila Zamana, Samara. Homicide. Conviction [nJ].
- 9 March – Artyom Borovik, Sovershenno sekretno periodical and publishing house, director and journalist. Sheremetyevo-1 Airport, Moscow. Incident not confirmed [?J].
- 22 March – Luisa Arzhieva, correspondent for Istina mira newspaper (Moscow). Avtury, Chechnya. Crossfire [?J].
- 17 April – Oleg Polukeyev, Homicide.
- 1 May – Boris Gashev, literary critic. Homicide. Conviction [nJ].
- 13 May – Alexander Yefremov, Chechnya. A photojournalist with west Siberian newspaper Nashe Vremya, he died when militants blew up a military jeep in which he was travelling. On previous assignments, Yefremov received positive attention for his news photographs from the war-torn region. Crossfire [J].
- 16 July – Igor Domnikov, from Novaya Gazeta, Moscow. Struck over the head with a hammer in the stairwell of his Moscow apartment building, Domnikov was in a coma for two months. His murderer was identified in 2003 and convicted in 2007. The men who ordered and organised the attack have been named by his paper but not charged. Homicide [J].
- 26 July – Sergei Novikov, Radio Vesna, Smolensk. Shot in a contract killing in stairwell of his apartment building. Claimed that he often criticized the administration of Smolensk Region. Homicide [?J].
- 21 September – Iskander Khatloni, Radio Free Europe, Moscow. A native of Tajikistan, Khatloni was killed at night in an axe attack on the street outside his Moscow apartment block. His assailant and the motive of the murder remain unknown. A RFE/RL spokeswoman said Khatloni worked on stories about the human-rights abuses in Chechnya. Homicide [nJ].
- 3 October – Sergei Ivanov, Lada-TV, Tolyatti. Shot five times in the head and chest in front of his apartment building. As director of largest independent television company in Tolyatti, he was an important player on the local political scene. Homicide. Gang responsible on trial [nJ].
- 18 October – Georgy Garibyan, journalist with Park TV (Rostov), murdered in Rostov-on-Don [nJ].
- 20 October – Oleg Goryansky, freelance journalist, press & TV. Murdered in Cherepovets, Vologda Oblast. Conviction [nJ].
- 21 October – Raif Ablyashev, photographer with Iskra newspaper. Kungur, Perm Krai. Homicide [nJ].
- 3 November – Sergei Loginov, Lada TV (Tolyatti). Incident not confirmed [nJ].
- 20 November – Pavel Asaulchenko, cameraman for Austrian TV, Moscow. Contract killing. Conviction of perpetrator [nJ].
- 23 November – Adam Tepsurkayev, Reuters, Chechnya. A Chechen cameraman, he was shot at his neighbour's house in the village of Alkhan-Kala (aka Yermolovka). Tepsurkayev filmed most of Reuters' footage from Chechnya in 2000, including the Chechen rebel Shamil Basayev having his foot amputated. Homicide (war crime) [J].
- 28 November – Nikolai Karmanov, retired journalist. Lyubim, Yaroslavl Oblast. Homicide [nJ].
- 23 December – Valery Kondakov, freelance photographer. Killed in Armavir, Krasnodar Krai [nJ].

2001

- 1 February – Eduard Burmagin, Homicide.
- 24 February – Leonid Grigoryev, Homicide [nJ].
- 8 March – Andrei Pivovarov, Homicide.
- 31 March – Oleg Dolgantsev, Homicide [nJ].
- 17 May – Vladimir Kirsanov, chief editor. Kurgan. Homicide [J].
- 2 June – Victor Popkov, Novaya gazeta contributore, died in Moscow Oblast hospital. Wounded in Chechnya two months earlier. Crossfire [J].
- 11 September – Andrei Sheiko, Homicide [nJ].
- 19 September – Eduard Markevich, 29, editor and publisher of local newspaper Novy Reft in Sverdlovsk Oblast. Shot in the back in a contract killing, homicide [J].
- 5 November – Elina Voronova, Homicide [nJ].
- 16 November – Oleg Vedenin, Homicide.
- 21 November – Alexander Babaikin, Homicide [nJ].
- 1 December – Boris Mityurev, Homicide.

2002

- 18 January – Svetlana Makarenko, Homicide.
- 4 March – Konstantin Pogodin, Novoye Delo newspaper, Nizhny Novgorod. Homicide.
- 8 March – Natalya Skryl, Nashe Vremya newspaper, Taganrog. Homicide [?J].
- 31 March – Valery Batuyev, Moscow News newspaper, Moscow. Homicide [nJ].
- 1 April – Sergei Kalinovsky, Moskovskij Komsomolets local edition, Smolensk. Homicide [nJ].
- 4 April – Vitaly Sakhn-Vald, photojournalist, Kursk. Homicide. Conviction [nJ].
- 25 April – Leonid Shevchenko, Pervoye Chtenie newspaper, Volgograd. Homicide [nJ].
- 29 April – Valery Ivanov, founder and chief editor of Tolyattinskoye Obozrenie newspaper, Samara Oblast. Contract killing [J].
- 20 May – Alexander Plotnikov, Gostiny Dvor newspaper, Tyumen. Homicide.
- 6 June – Pavel Morozov, Homicide.
- 25 June – Oleg Sedinko, founder of Novaya Volna TV & Radio Company, Vladivostok. Contract killing, explosive in stairwell [nJ].
- 20 July – Nikolai Razmolodin, general director of Europroject TV & Radio Company, Ulyanovsk. Homicide.
- 21 July – Maria Lisichkina Homicide [nJ].
- 27 July – Sergei Zhabin, press service of the Moscow Oblast governor. Homicide [nJ].
- 18 August – Nikolai Vasiliev, Cheboksary, Chuvashia. Homicide. Conviction [nJ].
- 25 August – Paavo Voutilainen, former chief editor of Karelia magazine, Karelia. Homicide [nJ].
- 4 September – Leonid Kuznetsov, Periodicals of Mari-El publishing house, Yoshkar-Ola. Incident not confirmed [?J].
- 20 September – Igor Salikov, head of information security at Moskovskij Komsomolets newspaper in Penza. Contract killing [nJ].
- 26 September – Roderick (Roddy) Scott, Frontline TV Company, Great Britain. Crossfire [J].
- 2 October – Yelena Popova, Homicide. Conviction [nJ].
- 19 October – Leonid Plotnikov Homicide. Conviction [nJ].
- 26 October – Tamara Voinova (Stavropol) and Maxim Mikhailov (Kaliningrad), Moscow theater hostage crisis . Terrorist Act [nJ].
- 21 December – Dmitry Shalayev, Kazan, Tatarstan. Homicide. Conviction [nJ].

==== 2003–2005 ====
2003

- 7 January – Vladimir Sukhomlin, Internet journalist and editor, Serbia.ru, Moscow. Homicide. Off-duty police convicted of his murder. Those behind the contract killing were not convicted[J].
- 11 January – Yury Tishkov, sports commentator, Moscow. Contract killing [nJ].
- 21 February – Sergei Verbitsky, publisher BNV newspaper. Chita. Homicide [nJ].
- 18 April – Dmitry Shvets, TV-21 Northwestern Broadcasting, Murmansk. Deputy director of the independent TV-21 station (Northwestern Broadcasting), he was shot dead outside the TV offices. Shvets' colleagues said the station had received multiple threats for its reporting on influential local politicians. Contract killing [nJ].
- 3 July – Yury Shchekochikhin, Novaya gazeta, Moscow. Deputy editor of Novaya gazeta and a Duma deputy since 1993. He died just a few days before his scheduled trip to United States to discuss the results of his journalist investigation with FBI officials. He investigated the Three Whales Corruption Scandal that allegedly involved high-ranking FSB officials. Shchekochikhin died from an acute allergic reaction. There has been much speculation about cause of his death. The investigation into his death has been opened and closed four times. Homicide [J].
- 4 July – Ali Astamirov, France Presse. Went missing in Nazran [?J].
- 18 July – Alikhan Guliyev, freelance TV journalist, from Ingushetia. Moscow. Homicide [nJ].
- 10 August – Martin Kraus, Dagestan. On way to Chechnya. Homicide [nJ].
- 9 October – Alexei Sidorov, Tolyatinskoye Obozreniye, Tolyatti. Second editor-in-chief of this local newspaper to be murdered. Predecessor Valery Ivanov shot in April 2002. Homicide. Supposed killer acquitted [?J].
- 24 October – Alexei Bakhtin, journalist and businessman, formerly Mariiskaya pravda. Mari El. Homicide [nJ].
- 30 October – Yury Bugrov, editor of Provincial Telegraph. Balakovo, Saratov Oblast. Homicide. Conviction [nJ].
- 25 December – Pyotr Babenko, editor of Liskinskaya gazeta. Liski, Voronezh Oblast. Homicide [nJ].

2004

- 1 February – Yefim Sukhanov, ATK-Media, Arkhangelsk. Homicide. Conviction [nJ].
- 23 March – Farit Urazbayev, cameraman, Vladivostok TV/Radio Company, Vladivostok. Incident not Confirmed [nJ].
- 2 May – Shangysh Mongush, correspondent with Khemchiktin Syldyzy newspaper, Tuva. Homicide [?J].
- 9 May – Adlan Khasanov, Reuters reporter, died in Grozny bomb attack that killed Chechen President Akhmad Kadyrov. Terrorist Act [J].
- 9 June – Paul Klebnikov, chief editor of newly established Russian version of Forbes magazine, Moscow. Contract killing, alleged perpetrators put on trial and acquitted. Homicide [J].
- 1 July – Maxim Maximov, journalist with Gorod newspaper, St Petersburg. Body not found. Homicide [J].
- 10 July – Zoya Ivanova, TV presenter, Buryatia State Television & Radio Company, Ulan-Ude, Buryatia. Homicide [nJ].
- 17 July – Pail Peloyan, editor of Armyansky Pereulok magazine, Moscow. Homicide [nJ].
- 3 August – Vladimir Naumov, nationalist reporter, Cossack author (Russky Vestnik, Zavtra), Moscow Oblast. Homicide [nJ].
- 24 August – Svetlana Shishkina, journalist, Kazan, Tatarstan. Homicide. Conviction [nJ].
- 24 August – Oleg Belozyorov, Moscow-Volgograd flight. Terrorist Act [nJ].
- 18 September – Vladimir Pritchin, editor-in-chief of North Baikal TV & Radio Company, Buryatia. Homicide [?J].
- 27 September – Jan Travinsky (St Petersburg), in Irkutsk as political activist for election campaign. Homicide. Conviction [nJ].

2005

- 23 May – Pavel Makeyev, reporter for TNT-Pulse Company, Rostov-on-Don. Run down while photographing illegal street racing. Incident not Confirmed [?J].
- 28 July – Magomed Varisov, political analyst and journalist, shot dead near his home in Makhachkala, Dagestan. He "had received threats, was being followed and had unsuccessfully sought help from the local police" according to Committee to Protect Journalists. Sharia Jamaat claimed responsibility for the murder. Homicide [J].
- 31 August – Alexander Pitersky, Baltika Radio reporter, Saint Petersburg. Homicide [?J].
- 3 September – Vladimir Pashutin, Smolensky Literator newspaper, Smolensk. Not Confirmed [nJ].
- 13 October – Tamirlan Kazikhanov, head of press service for Anti-Terrorist Center of the Russian Ministry of Internal Affairs's Main Department for the Southern Federal District, Nalchik. Crossfire [J].
- 4 November – Kira Lezhneva, reporter with Kamensky rabochii newspaper, Sverdlovsk Oblast. Homicide. Conviction [nJ].

==== 2006–2008 ====
2006

- 8 January – Vagif Kochetkov, newly appointed Trud correspondent in the region, robbed and killed in Tula. Acquittal [nJ].
- 26 February – Ilya Zimin, worked for NTV Russia television channel, killed in Moscow flat. Suspect tried in Moldova. Acquittal [nJ].
- 4 May – Oksana Teslo, media worker, Moscow Oblast. Arson attack on dacha. Homicide [nJ].
- 14 May – Oleg Barabyshkin, director of radio station, Chelyabinsk. Homicide. Conviction [nJ].
- 23 May – Vyacheslav Akatov, special reporter, Business Moscow TV show, murdered in Mytishchi, Moscow Oblast. Killer caught and convicted. Homicide. Conviction [nJ].
- 25 June – Anton Kretenchuk, cameraman, local Channel 38 TV, killed in Rostov-on-Don. Homicide. Conviction [nJ].
- 25 July – Yevgeny Gerasimenko, journalist with Saratovsky Rasklad newspaper. Murdered in Saratov. Conviction [nJ].
- 31 July – Anatoly Kozulin, retired freelance journalist. Ukhta, Komi Republic. Homicide [nJ].
- 8 August – Alexander Petrov, editor-in-chief, Right to Choose magazine Omsk, murdered with family while on holiday in Altai Republic. Under-age murderer charged and prosecuted. Homicide. Conviction [nJ].
- 17 August – Elina Ersenoyeva, reporter for Chechenskoye obshchestvo newspaper. Abducted in Grozny, Chechnya. Missing [?J].
- 13 September – Vyacheslav Plotnikov, reporter, local "Channel 41" TV, Voronezh. Incident not Confirmed [nJ].
- 7 October – Anna Politkovskaya, commentator with Novaya Gazeta, Moscow, shot in her apartment building's elevator;. Four accused in contract killing, acquitted in February 2009 [J]. Five were convicted in 2014, Rustam Makhmudov pulled the trigger, aided by his uncle Lom-Ali Gaitukayev and two brothers, Dzhabrail and Ibragim. Sergei Khadzhikurbanov, a former Moscow police officer was also involved, and he was pardoned in 2023 after agreeing to fight for 6 months in the Russo-Ukrainian War.
- 16 October – Anatoly Voronin, Itar-TASS news agency, Moscow. Homicide [nJ].
- 28 December – Vadim Kuznetsov, editor-in-chief of World & Home. Saint Petersburg magazine, killed in Saint Petersburg. Homicide [nJ].

2007

- 14 January – Yury Shebalkin, retired journalist, formerly with Kaliningradskaya pravda. Homicide in Kaliningrad. Conviction [nJ].
- 20 January – Konstantin Borovko, presenter of Gubernia TV company (Russian: "Губерния"), killed in Khabarovsk. Homicide. Conviction [nJ].
- 2 March – Ivan Safronov, military columnist of Kommersant newspaper. Died in Moscow, cause of death disputed. Incident not Confirmed. Investigation under Incitement to Suicide (Article 110) [?J].
- 15 March – Leonid Etkind, director at Karyera newspaper. Abduction and homicide in Vodnik, Saratov Oblast. Conviction [nJ].
- 5 April – Vyacheslav Ifanov, Novoye televidenie Aleiska, cameraman. Previously attacked by local military. Aleisk, Altai Krai. Incident not Confirmed [?J].
- April – Marina Pisareva, deputy head of Russian office of German media group Bertelsmann was found dead at her dacha outside Moscow in April

2008

(Putin's final months as president in his first term)

- 8 February – Yelena Shestakova, former journalist, St Petersburg. Killer sent to psychiatric prison. Homicide [nJ].
- 21 March – Gadji Abashilov, chief of Dagestan State TV & Radio Company VGTRK, shot in his car in Makhachkala. Homicide [?J].
- 21 March – Ilyas Shurpayev, Dagestani journalist covering Caucasus on Channel One, was strangled with a belt by robbers in Moscow. Alleged killers tracked to Tajikistan and convicted there of his murder. Homicide [?J].

=== The Medvedev presidency ===
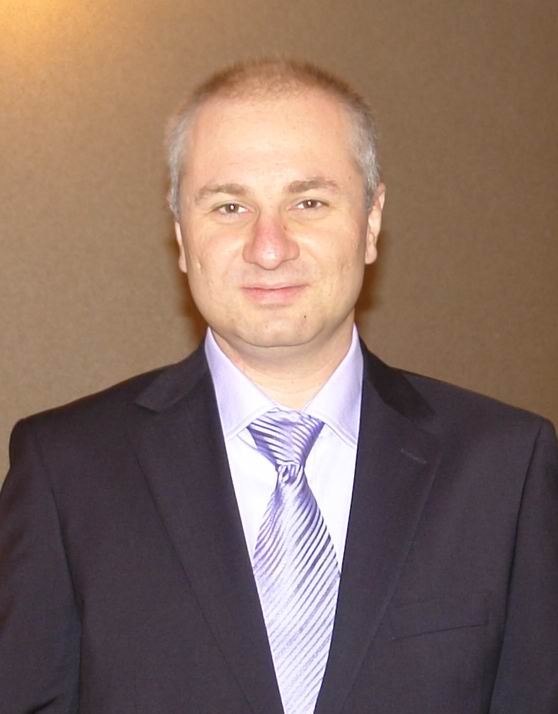
Magomed Yevloyev was shot and killed while in police custody in Ingushetia on 31 August 2008.

==== 2008 ====
- 31 August – Magomed Yevloyev was shot dead while in police custody in Ingushetia. Yevloyev was the founder of the opposition website Ingushetia.org and was known for his regular criticism of Ingush President Murat Zyazikov. The police officer involved in the killing, Ibragim Yevloyev, was found guilty of involuntary manslaughter and sentenced to two years in prison and was released after serving three months.
- 2 September – Abdulla Alishayev was shot several times by unknown assailants in Makhachkala, Dagestan, and died in hospital. Alishayev was the television host of TV-Chirkei and was known for his opposition to Islamic fundamentalism within the republic and Russia as a whole.
- 30 December – Shafig Amrakhov was shot and wounded by an unknown assailant at his apartment in Murmansk and later died in hospital. Amrakhov was the editor of the RIA 51 news agency and criticized the economic policies of Yuri Yevdokimov, the governor of Murmansk Oblast.

==== 2009 ====
- 4 January – Vladislav Zakharchuk died in a fire that engulfed a newspaper office in Vladivostok, Primorsky Krai. Zakharchuk was the advertisement manager for the newspaper Arsenyevskie Vesti. The newspaper was known for its criticism of the authorities in the krai and its chief editor and journalists had previously faced fines and imprisonment.
- 19 January – Stanislav Markelov and Anastasia Baburova were shot and killed by a masked gunman in Moscow. Markelov was a lawyer who worked with Novaya Gazeta and brought many cases against the Russian military, Chechen warlords, and neo-Nazi groups. Baburova was a journalist-in-training for Novaya Gazeta and was known for investigating neo-Nazi activity in Russia. Nikita Tikhonov (29) and Yevgenia Khasis (24), reportedly members of the Russian National Union, were charged in 2009 and convicted in 2011 of the murders.
- 30 March – Sergei Protazanov was found unconscious at his home in Khimki, Moscow Oblast, and later died in hospital. Authorities and relatives believed he was poisoned. Protazanov was the page designer for Grazhdanskoye Soglasiye, the only opposition newspaper in the city, and was seriously beaten by assailants a few days prior to his death.
- 29 June – Vyacheslav Yaroshenko died of wounds he received from a severe beating by an unknown assailant in April in Rostov-on-Don, Rostov Oblast. Yaroshenko was the chief editor of the Korruptsiya i Prestupnost newspaper and prior to his beating, the newspaper published multiple articles alleging corruption in the Oblast's government, police, and prosecutor's office.
- 15 July – Natalia Estemirova was abducted and then killed in Grozny, Chechnya. Her body was later found near Nazran, Ingushetia. Estemirova was a human rights activist for Memorial who worked with journalists of Novaya Gazeta and occasionally published in the newspaper herself. She was known for investigating murders and kidnappings in Chechnya and was a colleague of Anna Politkovskaya.
- 11 August – Malik Akhmedilov was found shot dead near Makhachkala, Dagestan. Akhemdilov was the deputy chief editor of Khakikat and the chief editor of the Sogratl newspapers, which focused on civic and political issues in the republic.
- 25 October – Maksharip Aushev was shot dead in Nalchik, Kabardino-Balkaria. Aushev worked on multiple human rights cases in neighboring Ingushetia and was the operator of Ingushetia.org following the death of Magomed Yevloyev in 2008.
- 16 November – Olga Kotovskaya died after falling out of a window on the 14th-floor of a building in Kaliningrad. Authorities classified the death as suicide while colleagues believe she was murdered for her work. Kotovskaya was the co-founder of the Kaskad radio and television station, which was embroiled in an ownership lawsuit brought by Vladimir Pirogov, the former vice governor of Kaliningrad Oblast.

==== 2010 ====
- 20 January – Konstantin Popov died from a beating received by Russian police while in custody in Tomsk. Popov was the co-founder and director of the Tema newspaper and was allegedly tortured prior to his death.
- 23 February – Ivan Stepanov was stabbed to death at his dacha in Khilok, Zabaykalsky Krai. Stepanov was a local correspondent for the Zabaikalsky rabochy newspaper and the author of three books that were popular in his district.
- 20 March – Maxim Zuyev went missing and was later found murdered in a flat he was renting in Kaliningrad. Zuyev was a reporter for multiple newspapers in Kaliningrad Oblast and was a moderator for the Koenigsberg journalist society.
- 5 May – Shamil Aliyev was shot and killed by unknown gunmen in Makhachkala, Dagestan. Aliyev was the founder of the Priboi and Vatan radio stations and director of the TNT-Makhachkala television network and was known for his anti-Wahhabist views, which were reflected in his radio and TV stations.
- 13 May – Said Ibragimov was shot dead while travelling with a team of repairmen to restore a television transmitter that was damaged by militants the previous day in Ayazihis Niva, Dagestan. Ibragimov was the director of TBS, a local television channel.
- 25 June – Dmitry Okkert, Moscow. A presenter with the Expert TV channel, Okkert was found stabbed to death in his own apartment. The director of the Expert media holding, Valery Fadeyev, does not believe that the brutal killing of his colleague was linked to his journalistic activities.
- 25 July – Bella Ksalova was fatally injured and later died in hospital after being hit by a vehicle near her home in Cherkessk, Karachay-Cherkessia. Ksalova was a correspondent for the Caucasian Knot website and news agency and wrote highly critical articles of local authorities. The driver, Arsen Abaikhanov, plead guilty and was sentenced three years in a penal colony.
- 1 August – Malika Betiyeva was killed along with four members of her family when a speeding vehicle hit hers on a highway in Chechnya. Betiyeva was the deputy chief editor of the Molodyozhnaya smena newspaper and a correspondent for Dosh magazine. She was known for writing about lawless behavior of government agencies in Chechnya and her work had to be published under an assumed name for her own safety.
- 11 August – Magomed Sultanmagomedov was killed in a drive-by-shooting in Makhachkala, Dagestan. Sultanmagomedov was the director of the Makhachkala TV station and was previously a target of an attempted bombing in 2008.
- 23 October – Yevgeny Fedotov died in hospital due to head injuries he received in a violent quarrel with his neighbor in Chita, Zabaykalsky Krai. The latter was charged with manslaughter.

==== 2011 ====
- 15 December – Gadzhimurat Kamalov was shot six times in a drive-by shooting outside his newspaper's office in Makhachkala, Dagestan. Kamalov owned the media company Svoboda Slova and was known for investigating corruption and rebel activity in the republic.

=== Under Putin (since 2012; including Russo-Ukrainian War) ===
==== 2012 ====
- 7 February – Victor Afanasenko died after sustaining a mysterious head injury at his home in Rostov-on-Don. As editor-in-chief of Crime and Corruption newspaper, Aphanasenko had been investigating raids in Kushchyovsky District and Rostov Oblast. While the official explanation was that he had slipped, a colleague who examined his body said that the injury could not have resulted from a fall.
- 7 July – Alexander Khodzinsky was stabbed to death by local businessman and former deputy mayor Gennady Zhigarev in Tulun, Irkutsk Oblast. Khodzinsky had campaigned against abusive and illegal practices in the construction of a shopping mall in the town center since 2007 and regularly complained to President Dmitry Medvedev and governor Dmitry Mezentsev about the issue.
- 5 December – Kazbek Gekkiev was shot dead at a street in Nalchik, Kabardino-Balkaria, after receiving death threats from local extremists. Gekkiev worked for local TV programs in the republic.

==== 2013 ====
- 9 July – Akhmednabi Akhmednabiyev was killed while driving just 50 metres from his house on the outskirts of Makhachkala, Dagestan, after receiving numerous death threats. Akhmednabiyev was the deputy editor of the newspaper Novoye Delo and wrote regularly about the politics of the republic and human rights issues in the North Caucasus. He was previously the victim of an attempted assassination in January 2013.

==== 2014 ====
- 1 August – Timur Kuashev was abducted from his home and later found dead in Nalchik, Kabardino-Balkaria. Kuashev worked for the magazine Dosh and received death threats and was previously stopped by local police a number of times.

==== 2016 ====
- 31 March – Dmitry Tsilikin was stabbed to death in his flat in Saint Petersburg. Tsilikin wrote for many independent media outlets and mainly focused on social issues and human rights. The suspected killer is neo-Nazi Sergey Kosyrev. The murder was attributed to Tsilikin's homosexuality.

==== 2017 ====
- 17 March – Yevgeny Khamaganov died of unexplained causes in Ulan-Ude, Buryatia. Khamaganov was known for writing articles that criticized the federal government and was allegedly beaten by unknown assailants on 10 March.
- 19 April – Journalist and former prisoner of conscience Nikolay Andrushchenko died in Saint Petersburg from wounds that he received from a severe beating by unknown assailants on 9 March. Andrushchenko was the co-founder of the newspaper Novy Petersburg and was previously jailed in 2009 by a city court for "libel and extremism".
- 24 May – Dmitry Popkov was found dead from gunshot wounds at a bathhouse close to his home in Minusinsk, Krasnoyarsk Krai. Popkov was the chief editor of the newspaper Ton-M and was known for investigating police corruption.
- 8 September - The body of Andrey Ruskov was found in the Bira River in Birobidzhan, Jewish Autonomous Oblast. Ruskov worked for the Bestvideo Broadcasting Studio.

==== 2018 ====
- 15 April – Maksim Borodin died of injuries from falling out of a window at his apartment in Yekaterinburg, Sverdlovsk Oblast, on 12 April. Authorities classified the death as suicide while colleagues reject the notion. Borodin regularly wrote on crime, corruption, and the recent involvement of Russian mercenaries in Syria.
- 23 July – Denis Suvorov was found dead after being stabbed by an unknown assailant in Nizhny Novgorod. Suvorov worked for the Vesti-Privolzhye television station and was an editor for the Vesti.Nizhny Novgorod internet portal.
- 30 July – Three journalists, Kirill Radchenko, Alexander Rastorguyev and Orkhan Dzhemal, were murdered in the Central African Republic while reporting on the involvement of Russian Private military companies and arms dealers in that country's civil war.
- 31 July – Sergei Grachyov went missing in Nizhny Novgorod on 21 July after taking a reporting trip there from Moscow. His body was found 11 days later. Grachyov worked for the Argumenty i Fakty newspaper.
- 10 September – Yegor Orlov disappeared on 7 September after leaving for work in Naberezhnye Chelny, Tatarstan. His body was found later in a river in the Yelabuzhsky District. Orlov was a correspondent and presenter at Chelny REN-TV.

==== 2022 ====
- 23 March – Oksana Baulina was killed by shelling in Kyiv while reporting for The Insider
- 15 August – Zemfira Suleymanova died after being hit by a PFM-1 mine in Donetsk Oblast, Ukraine.
- 20 August – Darya Dugina, a journalist working for RT and Tsargrad TV was killed by a car bomb
- 28 October – Svetlana Babayeva, head of the Simferopol branch of Rossiya Segodnya, killed by a stray bullet during a military shooting practice

==== 2023 ====
- April – Vladlen Tatarsky, a blogger with over 500,000 followers, was killed by a bomb in a cafe in St Petersburg.
- July – Rostislav Zhuravlev was killed by shellfire in the front line in Zaporizhzhia Oblast of Ukraine whilst working for Russia's RIA news agency.
- 23 November – Boris Maksudov, war correspondent for Rossiya 24 TV channel, died of shrapnel wounds after a drone strike in southeastern Ukraine.

==== 2024 ====
- 5 January – Zoya Konovalova, editor-in-chief of the Internet group of the state-controlled Kuban broadcast company, was found dead alongside her ex-husband. Preliminary reports suggested she was poisoned.
- 7 January – Alexander Rybin, journalist working with Rabkor, was found dead on a roadside in Shakhty after criticizing Russia's reconstruction efforts in Mariupol. Investigators claimed he died of cardiomyopathy.
- 19 September − Victoria Roshchyna, Ukrainian journalist, disappeared in August 2023, and in October was confirmed to have died in Russian detention. The Ukrainian government announced it would investigate her death as a potential murder and war crime.

== Journalists killed reporting on Chechnya ==
This category overlaps with that for Russia as a whole. It highlights the link between journalism, public activism, and human rights activists. In their different ways, the deaths of Dmitry Krikoryants, Dmitry Kholodov, Nadezhda Chaikova, Viktor Popkov, Anna Politkovskaya, Anastasia Baburova, Stanislav Markelov, and Natalia Estemirova all show that the troubled situation in the small North Caucasian republic reaches well beyond its formal borders.

For all who died, or were fatally wounded in Chechnya, see records in the IFJ database. Those killed in locations near or far from the North Caucasian republic (e.g. Natalya Alyakina, Anna Politkovskaya) whose deaths were also a consequence of the armed conflict in Chechnya.

=== 1993 ===
- 14–15 April – Dmitry Krikoryants, Grozny. Murdered over a year before open conflict broke out in Chechnya (first between pro-Dudayev and pro-Moscow factions, then with the intervention of federal forces). The killing of Krikoryants was linked to his investigation of the corrupt activities of the local regime, at home and abroad.

=== 1st Chechen war, 1994–1996 ===
- 1994 – Cynthia Elbaum. On assignment for Time magazine (USA), Elbaum was photographing the streets of Grozny when she was killed in a Russian bombing raid.
- 31 December 1994 – Vladimir Zhitarenko, a veteran military correspondent for the Russian armed forces daily Krasnaya Zvezda (Red Star), was hit by two sniper bullets outside the town of Tolstoy-Yurt, near Grozny.
- Nina Yefimova, a reporter for the new Vozrozhdenie (Revival) newspaper was abducted from her apartment and killed together with her mother. Journalists in Grozny and Moscow believe that her murder was related to stories she had published on crime in Chechnya.
- 10 January 1995 – Jochen Piest, a correspondent with Stern magazine (Germany), was killed in an attack by a Chechen rebel against a Russian mine-clearing unit in Chervlyonna, a village 24 kilometers northeast of Grozny. Rossiskaya Gazeta correspondent Vladimir Sorokin was wounded in the attack; Piest was fatally hit by three bullets.
- 22 May 1995 – Farkhad Kerimov. Farkhad Kerimov was murdered while filming for the Associated Press behind rebel lines in Chechnya. No motive has ever been established for the killing.
- Natalya Alyakina, a free-lance correspondent for German news outlets, was shot dead in June by a soldier after clearing a Russian checkpoint near Budyonnovsk.
- Shamkhan Kagirov, a reporter for the Moscow daily Rossiyskaya Gazeta and the local Vozrozhenie newspaper, was shot and killed in an ambush in Chechnya. Kagirov and three local police officers were traveling in a car near Grozny when they were attacked. The three officers were also killed.
- 11 March 1996 – Viktor Pimenov, a cameraman with the local Vainakh TV company was fatally shot in the back by a sniper positioned on the roof of a 16-story building in Grozny. Pimenov had been filming the devastation caused to the Chechen capital by 6–9 March rebel raid on the city. Pimenov was posthumously awarded the Rory Peck Award.
- 20 March 1996 – Nadezhda Chaikova, correspondent for the Obshchaya gazeta (Moscow) weekly newspaper disappeared while on assignment. Her body was found buried in the Chechen village of Gekhi on 11 April, blindfolded and showing signs of abuse. The cause of death was a gunshot wound to the back of the head. The identity of her executioners remains disputed. According to documents from Dudaev's archive that came into the hands of Russian special services in 2002, she was killed by people from the so-called "Department of state security of the Chechen Republic of Ichkeria" (Russian: Департамент государственной безопасности ЧРИ). At the time there were strong suspicions that Russian security services were involved.

=== September 1996 to October 1999 ===
No journalists are recorded as having been killed between September 1996 and October 1999. However, 22 journalists were kidnapped during this time period; all would later be released alive.

=== 2nd Chechen war, 1999 onwards ===
A counter-terrorist operation by the federal authorities began in the region in September 1999. It was declared over on 16 April 2009.

- 27–29 October 1999 – Journalist Supyan Ependiyev. On the evening of 27 October 1999, several short-range ballistic missiles hit a crowded outdoor market in central Grozny, killing and wounding hundreds of people. About an hour after the attack, Ependiyev went to the scene to cover the carnage for his paper. As he was leaving the site, a new round of rockets fell about 200 meters from the bazaar. Ependiyev suffered severe shrapnel wounds and died in a Grozny hospital the next morning. According to other sources, he died two days later.
- 29 October 1999 – Cameramen Ramzan Mezhidov and Shamil Gigayev. The journalists were part of a civilian convoy, including Red Cross workers and vehicles, which was attempting to leave Chechnya. Turned back at the republic's eastern border, they were travelling along the highway from Grozny to Nazran in neighbouring Ingushetia when their vehicles came under attack. As the convoy approached Shami-Yurt, a Russian fighter fired several time from the air, hitting a busload of refugees. Mezhidov and Gigayev left their vehicle to film the carnage. As they approached the bus, another Russian rocket hit a nearby truck, fatally wounding both journalists.
- 19 July 1999 – Photojournalist Vladimir Yatsina, an ITAR-TASS staff member freelancing on his only trip to Chechnya, was kidnapped and killed there by a group of Wahhabis.
- 16 October 2000 – Antonio Russo, an Italian freelance journalist, was killed in Tbilisi, Georgia. His body was found near a Russian army base. He had come to the Georgian capital to document the Chechen conflict as a Radio Radicale reporter, working for a radio station belonging to the Italian Radical Party (Partito Radicale). His body displayed injuries caused by torture, probably from military techniques. None of the tapes, articles, and writings left in his Georgian apartment have been found.
- Aleksandr Yefremov, a photojournalist of the western Siberian newspaper Nashe Vremya was killed in Chechnya when rebels blew up a military jeep in which he was riding. On previous assignments, Yefremov had won acclaim for his news photographs from the war-torn region.
- 26 September 2002 – Cameraman and editor Roddy Scott was killed in Ingushetia. Russian soldiers found his body in the republic's Galashki region, near the border with Chechnya, following a bloody battle between Russian forces and a group of Chechen fighters.
- 15 July 2009 – Natalia Estemirova, former teacher, TV journalist and award-winning human rights activist, board member of the NGO Memorial, and author for Novaya gazeta, was abducted and murdered. Estemirova was abducted around 8.30 am from outside her home in Grozny, Chechnya as she was working on "extremely sensitive" cases of human rights abuses in Chechnya. Two witnesses reportedly saw Estemirova being pushed into a car, shouting that she was being abducted. She was found with bullet wounds in the head and chest at 4.30 pm in woodland 100 m (328 ft) away from the "Kavkaz" federal highway near the village of Gazi-Yurt, Ingushetia.
- 1 August 2011 – Malika Betiyeva was killed on the Grozny-Shatoi highway. The deputy chief editor of Molodyozhnaya smena and Chechnya correspondent of the Dosh (Word) magazine died with four of her immediate family in a car crash.

== See also ==
- Russian mafia
- Crime in Russia
- List of newspapers in Russia
- List of Russian-language television channels
- Media freedom in Russia
- List of journalists killed in Tajikistan
- List of journalists killed during the Russo-Ukrainian War
