= Akhmednabi Akhmednabiyev =

Russian journalist

- Ахмеднаби Ахмеднабиев
- Born: December 29, 1958; Karata, Russian SFSR, USSR
- Died: July 9, 2013 (aged 54); Semender, Republic of Dagestan, Russia
- Cause of death: Multiple gunshot wounds
- Occupations: Journalist; Deputy editor
- Years active: Ten
- Employer(s): Novoye Delo (newspaper); Caucasian Knot (online)

Akhmednabi Omardibirovich Akhmednabiyev (Russian: Ахмеднаби Омардибирович Ахмеднабиев; 29 December 1958 – 9 July 2013) was a Russian journalist. He was the deputy editor of the independent news outlet Novoye Delo (translated "New Business"). On 9 July 2013 at 7 a.m. Akhmednabiyev was shot outside his house in the Semender suburb of Makhachkala, Dagestan, Russia after his name was added to a hit list for being critical of local law enforcement, speaking out on human rights and abuse, and defending Muslims.

== Personal ==
Before becoming a journalist, Akhmednabi Akhmednabiyev spent his time in the medical field. After being trained as a doctor, Akhmednabiyev qualified as a cardiologist. He practiced medicine in Karata, his native village, before moving to Dagestan.

Throughout his journalistic career, Akhmednabiyev received numerous death threats. In May 2012, he received a threatening text message after covering a rally in Makhachkala about the murder of five people in Kizlyar two months earlier. Akhmednabiyev made the text publicly known and requested the head of the Russian Federal Security Service to investigate and find the senders.

== Career ==
Akhmednabiyev served as the Deputy Editor of "Novoye Delo," one of Russia's top local newspapers, for ten years. The publication is a weekly circulation that is critical of authorities and reports on alleged corruption within the government. Founded in the 1990s, "Novoye Delo" is highly respected by Dagestanis because of its political attitude and its criticism of authorities.
Akhmednabiyev mostly covered stories regarding violations of human rights, and paid particular interest to cases of alleged torture and abduction by the police. Additionally, he wrote about local Dagestan politics.

According to Akhmednabiyev's colleagues, his most recent stories focused on the leader of his native Akhvakhsky district, whom he wrote about with harsh criticism.

== Death ==
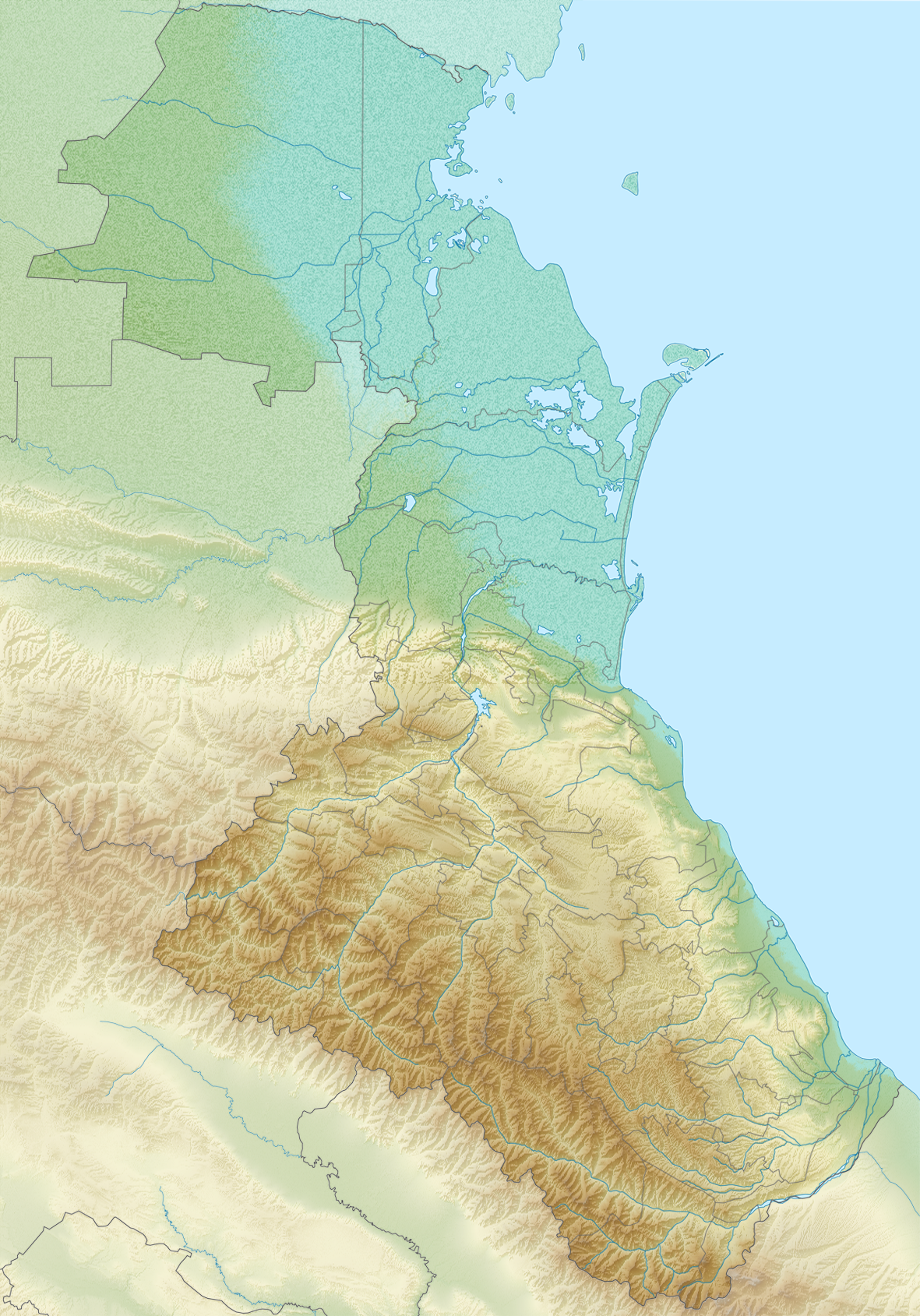
Semender is outside of Makhachkala in the Republic of Dagestan, Russia, on the Caspian Sea

Akhmednabi Akhmednabiyev died at the age of 54 from multiple gunshot wounds outside of his home in Semender. At 7:30 on the morning of July 9, 2013, a vehicle sped past and fired shots into Akhmednabiyev's car after he had gotten into it. The vehicle sped off and Akhmednabiyev died immediately.

Akhmednabiyev survived a previous attempt on his life after assailants fired guns at him as they drove past his home on January 11, 2013.

As opposed to classifying the incident as an assassination attempt, local prosecutor's classified it as a property damage case. After Akhmednabiyev's death, the case was reevaluated and added to the ongoing murder investigation after it was agreed both incidents were connected to his journalism career.

== Context ==
In 2009, Akhmednabiyev's name was added to a hit list that was circulated around Makhachkala. The list included the names of eight other journalists, one of which was also shot to death in Dagestan in 2011. Those who wrote the list demanded revenge for the deaths of Russian police officers. Although authorities have never uncovered the authors of the list, rumors spread that the list was written by relatives of Dagestani police officers killed by members of extremist religious groups.

According to one of Akhmednabiyev's colleagues at his publication, Akhmednabiyev's name was on the list because he was critical of law enforcement officials in his articles and the people who made the list assumed he was part of a religious group because he often defended Dagestan's Muslim population.

Akhmednabiyev was the 17th journalist to be murdered in Dagestan since 1993.

== Impact ==
Akhmednabiyev's death is one of the latest examples of the dangers Russian journalists face when speaking out on human rights. As a result, journalists will now have to self-censor their work more closely. Numerous murders of Russian journalists remain unsolved and according to the Organization for Security and Cooperation in Europe (OSCE), it has a negative effect on the media community. Publications, like Akhmednabiyev's "Novoye Delo," are being threatened by Russian law enforcement with lawsuits and there have been numerous attempts to close them down. Dagestan has become known as the most dangerous place in Russia for a journalist to work, while Russia stands as the ninth most dangerous country for journalists with a reported 340 journalists killed since 1990 and only 20 percent of those cases investigated.

== Reactions ==
On the day of Akhmednabiyev's death, more than 170 Russian journalists processed his body through the streets of Makhachkala. Each journalist wore a sign that read, "Who will be next?" in response to Russia's need to create protection for threatened journalists and to classify the crimes against them correctly.

Dunja Mijatović, who acts as Representative on Freedom of the Media for the OSCE, condemned the murder of Akhmednabi Akhmednabiyev on July 9, 2013. She stated his death is a reminder Russia needs to do more to ensure and guarantee the safety of journalists.

Ambassador Ian Kelly currently serves as the United States representative to the OSCE. On July 11, 2013, Ambassador Kelly addressed the Permanent Council, one of the main regular decision-making bodies of the OSCE, at its weekly meeting in Vienna. In his statement, Ambassador Kelly noted that the United States strongly condemns the assassination of Akhmednabi Akhmednabiyev. He also made note that the United States remains deeply concerned with the attacks in the Russian Federation made against journalists.

Both Mijatović and Kelly echoed praise for a statement made by the Investigative Committee of the Russian Federation, who said an investigation of Akhmednabiyev's murder would be handled with the highest priority.

== See also ==
- List of journalists killed in Russia
- Malik Akhmedilov, murdered 2009
- Magomedzagid (Magomed) Varisov, also of Novoye Delo, murdered 2005
- Abdulla Alishayev, murdered 2008
- Gadzhimurat Kamalov, murdered 2011
