= Kholodov =

Kholodov or Holodov (Russian: Холодов, from холод meaning cold) is a Russian masculine surname, its feminine counterpart is Kholodova or Holodova. Notable people with the surname include:

- Dmitry Kholodov (1967–1994), Russian journalist
