= Igor Domnikov =

Russian journalist (1959–2000)

- Игорь Домников
- Born: May 29, 1959
- Died: July 16, 2000 (aged 41); Burdenko Neurosurgery Institute, Moscow, Russia
- Cause of death: Injuries to the skull and brain
- Citizenship: Russia
- Occupation: Journalist
- Employer: Novaya Gazeta
- Known for: Reporting on topics such as businesses, corruption and culture
- Awards: Laureate Freedom of Speech award, 2010

Igor Aleksandrovich Domnikov (Russian: Игорь Александрович Домников; May 29, 1959 – July 16, 2000) was a Russian journalist and editor for special topics involving business corruption for Novaya Gazeta in Moscow, Russia, who was murdered in 2000. Although some individuals were convicted of the attack in 2007, the suspected mastermind, Sergey Dorovsky, an ex-government official from Lipetsk Region, was never convicted as the statute of limitations on the case had expired.

== Personal ==
Domnikov was married to Margarita, and the couple lived in Moscow in the same building as his colleague Oleg Sultanov. Many of Domnikov's colleagues believe the intended target of the attack was Sultanov, who was also an investigative reporter and had received threats on his life. They believe Domnikov was killed as a result of a mistaken identity.

== Career ==
Domnikov was a journalist for Novaya Gazeta who edited a special project involving business corruption. Between May 1999 and February 2000, Domnikov published five articles in Novaya Gazeta criticizing the economic policies of former Lipetsk Region vice governor Sergey Dorovsky.

== Death ==
Domnikov was attacked outside of his Moscow apartment by several men wielding hammers. Domnikov was hit on the head repeatedly, which knocked him unconscious. Due to the injuries sustained in the initial beating, Igor was sent to the Burdenko Institute, where he remained in a coma until his death two months later.

When Pavel Sopot was accused of masterminding the murder he stated: "I had no motive to mastermind the attack; I regret what happened, but I'm a small and modest entrepreneur who happened to be close to that story because of my naivety." Sopot was however in regular contact with Dorovsky in the days leading up to the crime.

A push for justice led to arrests and convictions in August 2007. Five members of a criminal gang were convicted of murdering Domnikov. They were sentenced to prison terms varying from 18 years to life for the Domnikov slaying and numerous other crimes.

Fifteen years after the attack, on March 11, 2015, Dorovsky was charged with the murder of Domnikov. Dorovsky was charged with "solicitation of deliberate infliction of grievous bodily harm to a victim due to his/her professional activity." This brought attention to the already popular paper in Russia but also brought unwanted attention and more attacks. The case, however, was not successfully prosecuted as the statute of limitations had run out.

== Impact ==
Domnikov was just one in a line of murdered journalists from the Novaya Gazeta. After the murder of reporters such as Stanislav Markelov, Anastasia Baburova, Anna Politkovskaya, Yuri Shchekochikhin and Domnikov, Novaya Gazeta has talked about supplying their reporters and lawyers with guns to protect themselves. The murders of reporters working for the Novaya Gazeta are a large blow to Russia because they are the only critical newspaper in Russia according to Dmitry Muratov.

== Reactions ==
Koïchiro Matsuura, director general of UNESCO, said, "Violent acts against journalists are attacks on freedom of expression and violations of the right - enshrined in Article 19 of the Universal Declaration of Human Rights - to seek, receive and impart information and ideas through any media."

Joel Simon, the executive director of the Committee to Protect Journalists, said, "Justice has been served in a journalist murder for the first time since President Vladimir Putin took office in 2000."

The director of the Center for Journalism in Extreme Situations said, "I'm afraid Domnikov's might become another in a long line of unsolved journalist murder cases."

The Novaya Gazeta displays a photograph in honor of the late Igor Domnikov in a case in the lobby of their main building in Moscow. Sokolov, a former colleague of Domnikov, said "it was all a tragic mistake," in reference to the beating and murder of the journalist. Many of Domnikov's colleagues seem to believe the murder of a result of mistaken identity. "We think that Igor Domnikov was mistaken for Oleg Sultanov," stated the late friend and coworker Yuri Shchekochikhin.

== Awards ==
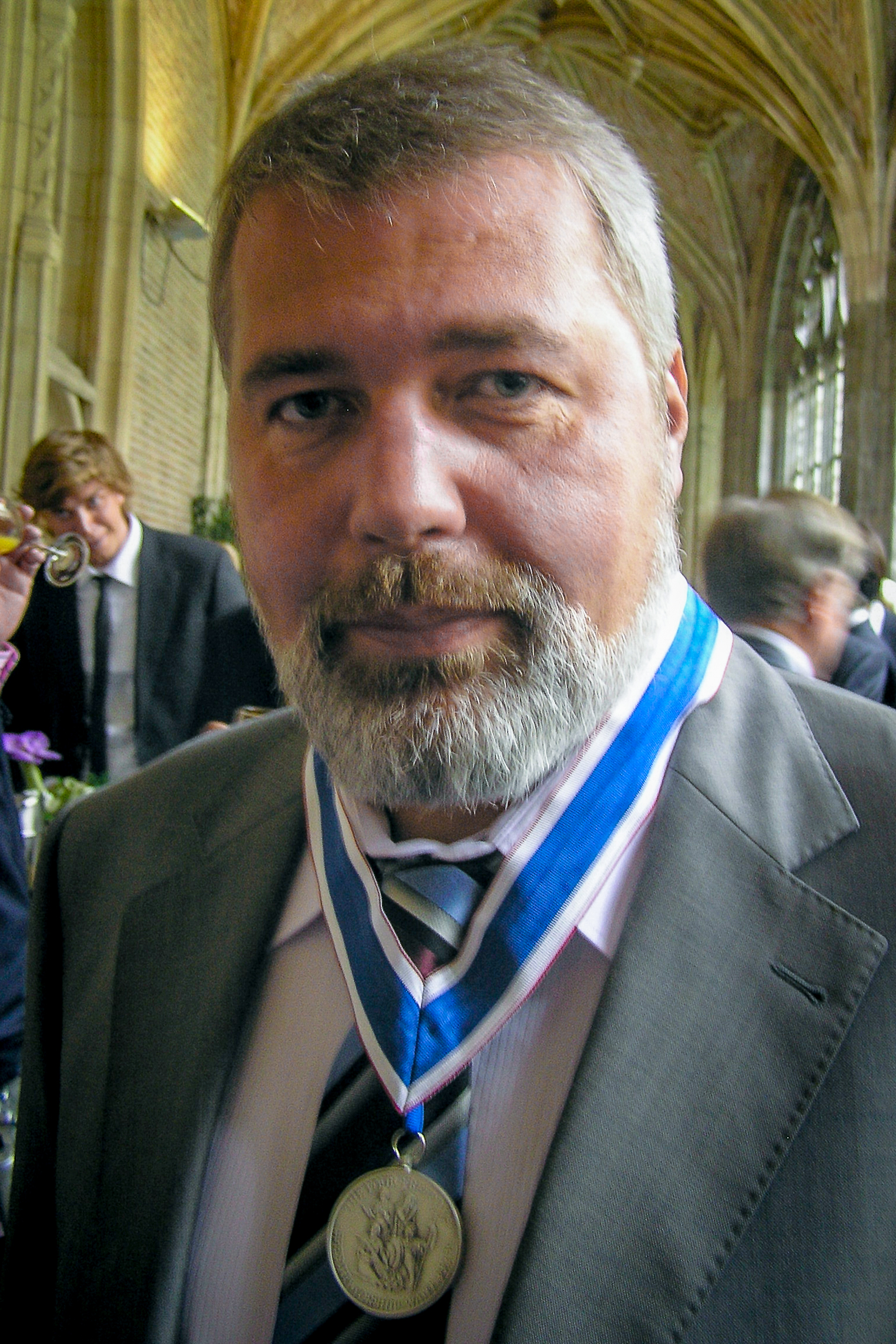
Former editor-in-chief Dmitry Muratov shortly after having received the Four Freedoms Award on behalf of Domnikov and colleagues at Novaya Gazeta

After his death, at the Laureate Freedom of Speech awards in 2010, he and four other journalists from the Novaya Gazeta – Stanislav Markelov, Anastasia Baburova, Anna Politkovskaya, and Yuri Shchekochikhin – were credited with paying the greatest price in order to fight for the right to free speech.

== See also ==
- List of journalists killed in Russia
