= Nikolay Andrushchenko =

Russian journalist

- Николай Андрущенко
- Born: September 10, 1943; Leninogorsk, Kazakhstan
- Died: April 19, 2017 (aged 73); Hospital in St. Petersburg
- Cause of death: Head trauma
- Education: St. Petersburg State University
- Occupation: Journalist
- Employer: Novy Peterburg (newspaper)
- Known for: work for human rights, critics against Putin, research for corruption in St. Petersburg's gouvernment
- Criminal charges: Libel, extremism, insults
- Criminal penalty: Fine
- Criminal status: Guilty
- Partner(s): married, but name unknown
- Children: son and daughter, names unknown

Nikolay Stefanovich Andrushchenko (Russian: Николай Степанович Андрущенко; September 10, 1943 – April 19, 2017), a Russian journalist for the Novy Peterburg newspaper in St. Petersburg, Russia, died at the Mariinsky Hospital after being beaten. He was a well-known critic and part of the opposition to Vladimir Putin in Russia. Andrushchenko was part of a critical documentary about Putin called 'Who is Mr. Putin' that linked President Putin with the organized crime, which is banned in Russia.

== Personal ==
Nikolay Andrushchenko was born in 1943 in the city of Leninogorsk in Kazakhstan. He earned a doctorate in mathematics and physics at the Saint Petersburg State University. In the early 1990s, he started his political career in the St. Petersburg City Council, which lasted for 3 years. He lived in St. Petersburg for a long time. He leaves a wife and two children, a son and a daughter.

== Career ==
Nikolay Andrushchenko started his political career in the early 1990s. He became a member of the St. Petersburg City Council. Because of what he experienced during the end of the Soviet Union he wanted to change Russia, especially by investigating the corruption in his country. He is the co-founder of the newspaper Novy Peterburg for which he wrote until his death in 2017. In 2007 Novy Petersburg was shut down after two official warnings because of two articles that were published. One article from Andrushchenko and another one by Konstantin Chernyaev. Novy Peterburg went to court and in 2009 they won their case and could publish again. He was attacked twice in the months before he died, because of some documents that could have been related to investigations he was working on. He was famous for his articles about human rights and his critic against the Russian president Vladimir Putin. He gave several interviews about his contacts with Putin in the 1990s when Andrushchenko was working as a lawmaker and Putin was working for the Mayor Anatoly Sobchak. Andrushchenko said that the center of Putin's politics had always been money and nothing else.

== Controversies ==
In 2007 he was charged with libel, extremism and insult by Yunis Lukmanov, the chairman of the housing committee of the city. He was found guilty by a Russian court and had to pay a fine. After that Andrushchenko decided to renounce his Russian citizenship. Two years later in 2009 he was charged with insult of Dmitry Mazurov, a member of the Russian prosecutor. He was found guilty and had to pay 20.000 Russian rubel but the prosecutors dropped the cases of libel and extremism. The original charges were based on articles about oppositions protest and about a trial of four men that had been convicted of murdering a student.

== Death ==
St. Petersburg in Russia is shown relative to the capital city Moscow.

Nikolay Andrushchenko was on his way to a business meeting March 9, 2017 when a group of unknown people beat him until he lost consciousness. Several hours later he was found near his house with head trauma. He was rushed to the Mariinsky Hospital where doctors tried to save his life with brain surgery, but left him in a medically induced coma. Although he started breathing on his own again, he died on April 19, 2017. Denis Usov, editor of the Novy Peterburg believed that the attack was linked to Andrushchenko's articles about corruption in St. Petersburg.

The attack was investigated by the 78th police department in the Central District of St. Petersburg, but according to Alevtina Ageyeva, director of Novy Peterburg, "The police are unlikely to put much effort into the investigation, since Andrushchenko wrote a lot about the arbitrariness in the police, and he was not liked for his intransigence." The attackers are still unknown.

== Context ==
Andruschnko is the seventh journalist to die in Putin's second presidency. The day after Andrushchenko was assaulted another journalist was attacked. 35-year old Yevgeny Khamaganov died on March 17 because of his injuries. All the killed journalist wrote about and investigated cases of corruption on a local or national level.

== Impact ==
Nikolay Andrushchenko investigated several cases of corruption after the end of the Soviet Union. He was known as a Vladimir Putin critic and for his articles about human rights and police misuse of authority.

== See also ==
- Human rights in Russia
- List of journalists killed in Russia
- Media freedom in Russia
