= Nadezhda Chaikova =

Russian feminine journalist

- Надежда Чайкова
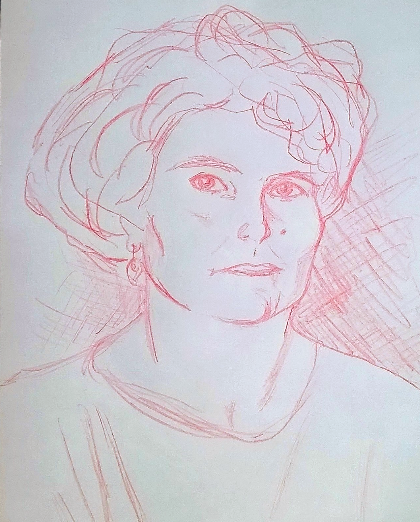
- Sketch of Nadezhda Chaikova
- Born: 23 January 1963; Moscow
- Disappeared: 20 March 1996 (aged 33) village of Sernovodskoye, Sernovodsky District, Chechen Republic
- Died: supposedly, 30 March 1996
- Body discovered: village of Gekhi, Urus-Martanovsky District, Chechen Republic
- Occupation: journalist
- Known for: war reports for Obshchaya Gazeta

Nadezhda Vladimirovna Chaikova (Russian: Надежда Владимировна Чайкова; 23 January 1963 – 1996) was a correspondent for the Russian weekly Obshchaya Gazeta. A colleague of Anna Politkovskaya, she had traveled frequently to Chechnya and neighbouring regions. Near the end of the war, in 1996, she was kidnapped and killed by unidentified gunmen.

== Biography ==
Nadezhda Chaikova was born on 23 January 1963 in Moscow.

Before her university studies, she was working as a collector in the Moscow's Start factory of semiconductor devices as well as a nurse, hospital reception registrar, inspector in Moscow medical services.

Her son Denis was born in 1989. In the same year, Chaikova, a historian-orientalist by education, graduated from the historical faculty of Moscow State University. Afterwards, Chaikova studied in the Graduate School of the Institute of Oriental Studies of the Russian Academy of Sciences.

Before coming to Obshchaya Gazeta in 1995, she had worked in radio and the state news agencies ITAR-TASS and RIA Novosti.

=== North Caucasus ===
Chaikova worked at Obshchaya Gazeta since October 1995. There, her stories were mostly travel reports from the North Caucasus about the Dagestan Republic, Ingush Republic, and Chechen Republic.

During the war in Chechnya, Chaikova was known for her exposés of Russian military atrocities and close contacts with the Chechen resistance. She was known for her hard-hitting coverage of the First Chechen War and issues such as the use of special "filtration camps" by Russian authorities to control the population. She was three times in Chechnya to cover war affairs. Nadezhda succeeded to interview then Chechen leader Dzhokhar Dudayev. Third and last assignment began in early of March 1996. She sent her last report "Who can live among corpse and ruins?" (Кто сможет жить среди трупов и развалин?) from Chechnya, about the village of Sernovodsk. Shortly before her death, Chaikova managed to film the devastation and civilian victims in the wake of the Russian raid on the village of Samashki.

=== Death ===
On 20 March 1996, Chaikova disappeared in Chechnya while on assignment; she was last seen alive near the village of Sernovodskoye with a group of refugees from Samashki. Three weeks later, on 11 April 1996, her body was found in a sewage pipe in the Chechen village of Gekhi, Urus-Martanovsky District, by the village elders. Unable to identify her, three days later they buried the corpse in a corner of their local cemetery in accordance with the Chechen customs. Photos were taken before her burial and a forensic examination of her body after exhumation by the local prosecutors suggest that she was blindfolded and bearing signs of severe beatings. The cause of death was determined to be a gunshot wound to the back of the head, performed from a Makarov PM handgun while she was in kneeling position.

According to the Committee to Protect Journalists, the killing may have been work of Russian federal troops angered at her work, in particular the filming of Samashki, or might have been ordered by the Chechen rebels acting on rumors spread by the Russian FSB security service that she was a spy. The federal government never investigated the murder, as the criminal inquiry was soon halted by the federal Russian prosecutor's office "for lack of evidence and substance of a crime." However, according to Russian special services in 2002, Chaykova was killed by people from the Department of State Security of the Chechen Republic of Ichkeria. Chaikova herself had written a letter in which she wrote: "In case I am killed or wounded, you should blame the Russian army or the Russian security services. Please do not put the blame for this on the so-called 'Dudaev's fighters'". She also did leave a videotape, later smuggled out of Chechnya and delivered to her newspaper, on which she revealed how the FSB had been repeatedly trying to turn her into an informant and that she had refused to comply. Death threats then began and soon after this she was dead.

Her killing was strongly condemned by the UNESCO Director-General Federico Mayor: "It is with profound indignation that I have learned of the assassination of Nadezhda Chaikova. Her name must now be listed with those of other martyrs of independent Russian media like Vladislav Listyev and Dimitri Kholodov. In strongly condemning this murder, I remind all those who have recourse to violence that it has never solved problems but only makes them worse. I call on Russian and international public opinion to defend journalists working for independent and pluralistic media, for the sustainable development of free societies."

== See also ==
- List of kidnappings
- Natalia Estemirova
- Nina Yefimova
- Ramzan Khadzhiev
- List of solved missing person cases: 1950–1999
