= Alexei Sidorov =

Russian journalist (1971–2003)

- Алексей Сидоров
- Born: December 29, 1971; Togliatti, Russia
- Died: October 9, 2003 (aged 31); Died at his apartment in Togliatti
- Cause of death: Multiple stab wounds
- Body discovered: His body was discovered by his wife.
- Resting place: Banakenskogo Cemetery
- Occupations: Journalist and editor-in-chief
- Employer: Togliatti Review
- Notable work: Investigative reporting of the Russian mafia
- Spouse: Olga Lapitskaya
- Children: Kirill

Alexei Sidorov, sometimes transliterated as Aleksei Sidorov, (December 29, 1971 – October 9, 2003), a Russian journalist and editor-in-chief for the Tolyatinskoye Obozreniye (Togliatti Review) in Tolyatti, Samara Oblast, Russia, was known for his investigations into the Russian mafia. Alexei was killed in what was suspected to be an organized crime contract killing.

== Personal ==
Alexei Sidorov lived with his wife in an apartment complex in Tolyatti, Russia. He had one known child, Leonid Sidorov.

== Career ==
Sidorov started out as a journalist for Togliatti Review, a local newspaper. He worked under his mentor Valery Ivanov, who was the editor in 2002. He became known for his investigations into dealings by the Russian mafia. Sidorov took over as editor-in-chief for the paper after the murder of Ivanov by Russian mafia, and continued the work that Ivanov was doing and overseeing all investigative reporting for the paper until his death six months later. During the time of Ivanov's murder, Sidorov told the New York Times, "They can't kill us all." He was then murdered about six months later.

== Death ==
Places mentioned in Russia shown relative to the capital city Moscow.

Sidorov's wife, Olga Lapitskaya, was waiting for him to return on October 9, 2003, when she heard Sidorov call for help using the apartment buzzer. She ran downstairs to discover him bleeding on the steps of their building. She called emergency services but even with their arrival, Sidorov did not survive his wounds. After an investigation it was found that Alexei was attacked by two men while walking up to his complex. He was stabbed repeatedly and left to die. While it was initially reported that Sidorov's death was not a product of the Russian Mafia, further investigation showed that he was in fact the victim of a mafia hit. The two cases have never been solved.

== Context ==
Being a journalist in Russia is said to be one of the most dangerous jobs. Russian police are not good with cooperating in investigations which allowed the mob to spread crimes all across Russia. Towns like Togliatti exist all over Russia, journalists have to worry about the danger that follows their job. The Russian mafia has made it clear that they do not want to be bothered. While Russian civilians turn to law enforcement to protect them, the Russian police say they are unable to deal with the threats the Russian mob brings.

== Impact ==
The death of Alexei Sidorov has given views of the danger that Russian journalists are facing in the past and the present. Lack of law enforcement and prosecution of those who murder journalists are the primary reasons Russian journalists worry about their safety. Russian law enforcement located in places like Togliatti, blame victims for getting involved in the mob cases rather than help create a more safe community for everyone living there. Sidorov's murder also brings to light the shortcomings of the Russian media and court system. The police only continue to investigate murders like Sidorov to appease public disapproval. The Russian courts are also at fault because they are showing how powerful the mob is by setting suspects free who come into the equation after long investigations.

== Reactions ==
Sidorov's death sparked new discussions regarding the safety of journalists in Russia. PEN America wrote a letter to the President Dmitry Medvedev demanding investigations to put an end to immunity in the case of journalists that were murdered in Russia.

Koïchiro Matsuura, director-general of UNESCO condemned the journalist's death, "The murder of Alexi Sidorov marks yet another attack on democracy and transparency in Russia and must be condemned as such."

State Deputy Vladimir Ryzhkov said, "Our journalists have no protection, and that tells you that journalism is a very risky profession and that there is a great deal of unhappiness in society."

== See also ==
- List of journalists killed in Russia
