= Hakikat =

XӀакъикъат
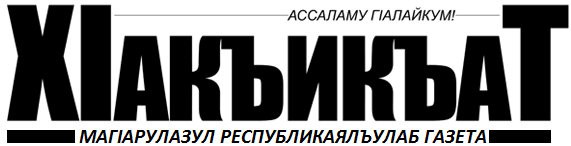
- Type: Broadsheet
- Founded: 3 April 1917
- Language: Avar
- Headquarters: pr. Peter I, 61; Makhachkala, Dagestan

Hakikat (Avar: XӀакъикъат, lit. 'The Truth') is the main Avar language newspaper, published in Makhachkala, Dagestan.

Previous names:

- 1917-1918: XӀакъикъат (Truth)
- 1918-1920: ХӀалтӀулел чагӀи (Working People)
- 1920-1921: БагӀараб байрахъ (Red Flag)
- 1921-1934: БагӀарал мугӀрул (Red Mountains)
- 1934-1951: МагӀарул большевик (Bolshevik of the mountains)
- 1951-1957: Дагъистаналъул правда (Dagestani Truth)
- 1957-1990: БагӀараб байрахъ (Red Flag)

Among the authors published by the newspaper was Rasul Gamzatov.

In 2009, deputy editor of the paper Malik Akhmedilov was shot to death; colleagues believed his murder was linked to his critical journalism that reported on government attempts to suppress political and religious "extremism" and his investigations into unsolved, high-level assassination of officials in Dagestan.
