= Remembrance Day of Journalists Killed in the Line of Duty =

Remembrance day in Russia

- Date: December 15
- Next time: 15 December 2025
- Frequency: annual
- Related to: International Day to End Impunity for Crimes Against Journalists

Remembrance Day of Journalists Killed in the Line of Duty (Russian: День памяти журналистов, погибших при исполнении обязанностей) is a remembrance day, observed on December 15 in Russia in memory of journalists who died while performing their professional duties. The day was established by the Union of Journalists of Russia (RUJ) in 1991, following the deaths of journalist Viktor Nogin and cameraman Gennadi Kurennoy in the former Socialist Federal Republic of Yugoslavia in September that year after their car came under fire from Serbian fighters. In Moscow the day is observed at Nikitsky Boulevard.

According to representatives of the Union of Journalists of Russia, between 10 and 20 journalists are killed each year in Russia under various circumstances.

According to the OSCE representative for the freedom of the press (RFoM) Dunja Mijatović, “journalists in Russia are far too often subject to acts of intimidation, threats and attacks”. Mijatović reminded people that “all attacks against journalists should be vigorously investigated by the state authorities, and the perpetrators and the masterminds prosecuted.”

== See also ==
- List of journalists killed in Russia
- Media freedom in Russia
- World Press Freedom Day
