= Oleg Slabynko =

Russian television producer and journalist

- Олег Слабынько
- Born: 8 August 1962; St. Petersburg, Russian SFSR, USSR
- Died: 25 January 1996 (aged 33); Moscow, Russia
- Cause of death: Firearms (homicide/contract killing)
- Occupations: Television producer and journalist
- Employer(s): Moment Istiny (Moment of Truth), Time Moves Forward, Forgotten Names

Oleg Aleksandrovich Slabynko (Russian: Олег Александрович Слабынько; 1962 – 1996), a Russian, was working for Russian Television Channel 2 as a TV producer for the show Moment Istiny (Moment of Truth) in Moscow, Russia. Slabynko was murdered in his home by two unidentified assailants on a contract killing. Slabynko was one of over 562 contract murders that happened over the course of three years.

== Personal ==
Oleg Slabynko was born in 1962 in St. Petersburg, Russia. Slabynko was interested in journalism all of his life and by the age of 24 was already in a position of importance in his chosen profession. He was divorced and lived together with his parents and elder daughter in an apartment in Moscow.

== Career ==
By the time he was 33, Slabynko became the producer of multiple TV programs on Russian Television Channel 2, including Forgotten Names and the Moment Istiny (Moment of Truth). Slabynko came to work for Channel 2 at the time Boris Yeltsin was in political control of the Channel and wanted it used for his political goals. His appointed head of Russian television, Chairman Vyacheslav Bragin, who wanted to clean up broadcasting from corruption. To pursue this goal, Bragin hired two young associates to replace an experienced executive. This was why Bragin hired the 30-year-old Slabynko as chairman of the Ostankino television station without Slabynko having any previous experience in television. Slabynko had only worked for Bragin for two months as his press secretary but he had earned the trust of his boss.

Three years later, Slabynko was the producer of two news programs, Moment Istiny or the Moment of Truth and Forgotten Names on Russian Television Channel 2. The Moment of Truth program allowed for Russian civilians to ask questions of prominent public figures. He was also a general manager of Time Moves Forward, an advertising agency. He employed strong, hard-hitting journalists to give the Moscow public the news. He was a main contributor for the freedom of speech movement in Russia.

== Death ==
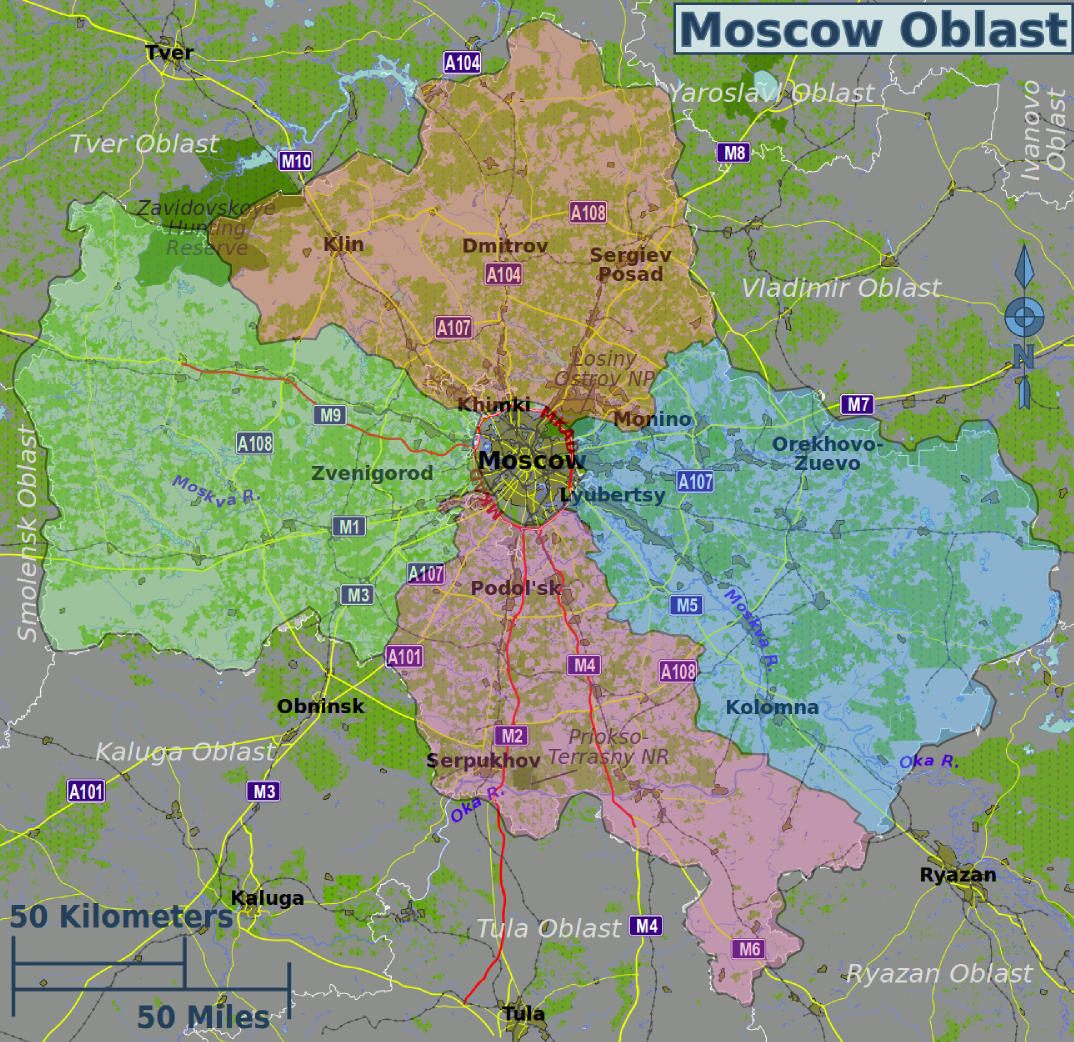
A map of the Moscow Oblast region where Slabynko was assassinated.

Oleg Slabynko was shot dead by two unidentified individuals in his own apartment in Moscow on 25 January 1996 at 10:30pm. The apartment was located on Klinskaya Ulitsa. Before Slablynko was attacked at his front door, his assassins called his apartment to make sure he was there. The gunmen approached his apartment and shot Slabynko four times at close range with a 9mm gun, according to Moscow Police. Slabynko was known to air hard hitting, abrasive news and Moscow in the 1990s was not the safest place for journalists. An unidentified group was contracted to kill leaders and people of influence in Moscow. Over a twenty-year period, 562 Russian officials were murdered.

== Impact ==
Oleg Slabynko's murder called light to the contract murders of Russian journalists. Many prominent business owners and public figures were murdered in 1996 alone. Slabynko's death rose awareness of the eminent danger that public figures were in all across Russia. Russians were reminded by Slabynko's murder of a previous murder of Vladislav Listyev, a famous talk-show host and State Television executive, who was also shot to death at his home in March 1995. The publication of criminal activity that goes on in Russian television and advertising was brought to Russian civilians following this murder. A special police unit was created after these two high-profile murders.

== Reactions ==
It took a month for the Russian general prosecutor to assign a police task force to investigate the murders of Slabynko and three other Russian journalists. Slabynko's former boss did not believe that Slabynko would have been murdered for what he chose to air on television but police reports have proven otherwise. The UNESCO Director-General Federico Mayor condemned the assassins of Oleg Slabynko and said the following: "I learned with dismay about the murder of Oleg Slabynko and condemn it in the strongest terms. UNESCO defends the existence in its Member States of an independent and pluralistic press, an essential component for any democratic societies. I call on Russian authorities to do everything within their power to guarantee the conditions of security for journalists to carry out their profession."

== See also ==
- List of journalists killed in Russia
- Freedom of the press in Russia
- Human rights in Russia
