= Natalia Alyakina =

Russian journalist

Natalya Alyakina-Mrozek
- Born: ca. 1955; Krasnodar, Soviet Union
- Died: June 17, 1995 (aged 40); Budyonnovsk, Russia
- Cause of death: Murder
- Education: Kuban State University; Moscow State University
- Occupation: Broadcast journalist
- Employer: RUFA News Agency
- Spouse: Gisbert Mrozek

Natalya Alyakina-Mrozek (Russian: Наталья Алякина-Мрошек; ca. 1955–17 June 1995), often transliterated as Natalia, was a Russian broadcast journalist, who was working for the German radio news agency Rufa Rundfunk-Agenturdienste and Focus magazine, in Budyonnovsk, Russia when she was killed during the First Chechen War.

== Personal details ==
Natalya Alyakina-Mrozek was 40 years old when she was killed. She was married to Gisbert Mrozek, sometimes spelled Gizbert, who was also a working journalist for Rufa.

== Death ==
While passing through an Army checkpoint in route to cover a mass hostage situation on June 17, 1995, Natalya Alyakina-Mrozek and the driver of the car were shot at by a Russian soldier. Her husband, Gisbert Mrozek was also present in the car but he was uninjured. Alyakina-Mrozek died minutes later from a gunshot wound to the neck.

== Investigation ==
Immediately after the incident, a Russian judge ordered an investigation into premeditated murder. The Russian soldier was later found guilty of negligence in his use of his weapons, but a judge suspended his sentence as Chechen war participant.

== See also ==
- List of journalists killed in Russia
