= Anatoly Levin-Utkin =

Russian journalist (died 1998)

Anatoly Levin-Utkin (Russian: Анатолий Левин-Уткин) was a Russian journalist and deputy editor of the weekly newspaper Yuridichesky Peterburg Segodnya ('Legal Petersburg Today'), a startup newspaper he helped launch.

== Murder ==
He was killed on 21 August 1998 in an apparent robbery outside his home which is believed to be in connection to two investigative reports on Russian customs and secret services that he published a week earlier. On the day he was attacked, Levin-Utkin was working on a third report in his investigative series, containing allegations of corruption against Vladimir Putin, the newly appointed head of the FSB. In a letter to Russian president Boris Yeltsin, the Committee to Protect Journalists said that Russian customs and secret service officials implicated in Yuridichesky Peterburg Segodnya's investigations called Levin-Utkin demanding to know the names of the paper's sources and reporters.

== See also ==
- List of journalists killed in Russia
