= Center for Journalism in Extreme Situations =

The Center for Journalism in Extreme Situations (Russian: Центр экстремальной журналистики, romanized: Tsentr ekstremalnoy zhurnalistiki) is a press advocacy group in Russia. Founded in 2000 as part of the Russian Union of Journalists, the center is the primary media watchdog in the country and produces a variety of publications, including the weekly bulletin of media news and commentary Dangerous Profession.

The Center's director, Oleg Panfilov, warned against a proposition in Russia to arm journalists following the January 2009 murder of Novaya Gazeta reporter Anastasia Baburova and human rights attorney Stanislav Markelov.

In early 2012, the work of the Center was stopped by the efforts of its board and founder, the Russian Union of Journalists.
