= Semender =

Semender Семендер
- Urban-type settlement
- Interactive map of Semender
- Location of Semender Semender (Republic of Dagestan)
- Coordinates: 42°59′N 47°24′E
- Country: Russia
- Federal subject: Dagestan
- Administrative district: Kirovsky City District
- Founded: 1999
- Urban-type settlement status since: 1999

Population (2010 Census)
  - Total: 13,677
  - Estimate (2025): 16,085 (+17.6%)

Administrative status
  - Subordinated to: City of Makhachkala

Municipal status
  - Urban okrug: Makhachkala Urban Okrug
- Time zone: UTC+3 (MSK)
- Postal code: 367006
- OKTMO ID: 82701362071

Semender population
- 2010 Census: 13,677
- 2002 Census: 7,558

Semender (Russian: Семендер) is an urban locality (an urban-type settlement) under the administrative jurisdiction of Kirovsky City District of the City of Makhachkala in the Republic of Dagestan, Russia. As of the 2010 Census, its population was 13,677.

== History ==
It was established as an urban-type settlement in 1999.

== Administrative and municipal status ==
Within the framework of administrative divisions, the urban-type settlement of Semender is in jurisdiction of Kirovsky City District of the City of Makhachkala. Within the framework of municipal divisions, Semender is a part of Makhachkala Urban Okrug.
