= Malik Akhmedilov =

Russian investigative journalist

- Малик Ахмедилов
- Born: 1976
- Died: 11 August 2009 (aged 32–33); Makhachkala
- Occupations: Investigative journalist and editor

Malik Akhmedilov (Russian: Малик Ахмедилов; c. 1976 – 11 August 2009), also known as Abdulmalik Akhmedilov, was a Russian investigative journalist based in the southern Republic of Dagestan.

== Career ==
Akhmedilov was a leading investigative correspondent for the Avar language daily newspaper, Hakikat (ХIакъикъат, also transliterated as Khakikat), which translates to "The Truth" in English. He also worked as the editor-in-chief of the political monthly, Sogratl (Согратль), which translates as "Mountain Village". Sogratl focuses on political issues and civics.

Akhmedilov was known for his reports on several unsolved assassinations of officials in Dagestan. In columns in Hakikat, Akhmedilov heavily criticized Russian federal forces and local law enforcement for curbing religious and political freedom under the guise of an "anti-extremism" campaign.

Akhmedilov was awarded an Internationale Parliaments-Stipendium Fellowship through the German Parliament in 2006 and served as an aide to Margrit Wetzel (SPD).

== Death ==
Akhmedilov was found shot to death in a car on the edge of the Dagestani capital, Makhachkala, on 11 August 2009. He was 33 years old at the time of his murder. Police believed that Akhmedilov was shot at close range with a pistol, although independent sources have claimed he was shot with a Winchester Rifle. According to the same source, eyewitnesses assert that the shots were made by unknown persons who got out of a "Zhiguli" car without number plates and tinted glasses. They have also stated that had seen the car for several days near the journalist's house.

The killing of Akhmedilov came after a string of murders of reporters and journalists in Dagestan including that of television journalist Abdulla Alishayev in September 2008. Two more Dagestani journalists were killed in March 2009.
