= Russian Union of Journalists =

Professional association

- Союз журналистов России
- Formation: November 13, 1918 (as Russian Union of Soviet Journalists) Re-established 1992
- Type: Professional association / Trade union
- Headquarters: 4 Zubovsky Boulevard, Moscow, Russia
- Region served: Russia
- Members: Over 100,000
- Chair: Vladimir Gennadyevich Solovyov (since 2017)
- Affiliations: International Federation of Journalists (1995–2026)
- Website: ruj.ru

Russian Union of Journalists (RUJ; Russian: Союз журналистов России) is the largest professional association of media workers in the Russian Federation, claiming more than 100,000 members across eighty-two regional branches and about forty specialist guilds. The organisation combines the functions of a trade union with those of a public-interest NGO, seeking to defend journalists’ labour rights while promoting professional ethics and freedom of expression.

== History ==
Journalists first organised nationally on 13 November 1918, when the Russian Union of Soviet Journalists held its founding congress in Moscow amid civil-war turmoil. In 1959 the body was re-cast as the Union of Journalists of the USSR, serving both as a workplace defender and as an ideological gate-keeper during the late Soviet decades. As the Soviet federation unravelled, a congress of the Union of Journalists of the RSFSR met on 17 November 1990, and in 1992 delegates adopted the present all-Russian statute and title.

== Membership and organisation ==
RUJ describes itself as a federative structure in which metropolitan unions in Moscow, Saint Petersburg and Tatarstan enjoy a degree of autonomy while sending delegates to a national congress held every four years. A TASS survey on the eve of the union’s tenth congress reported around 100,000 card-holding members.

== Activities and services ==
The union’s day-to-day work centres on legal assistance, emergency solidarity funds and professional development. Annual Media-Forum workshops bring provincial reporters to Moscow for training, while regional press centres host seminars on digital safety and investigative techniques. RUJ also issues press cards used for accreditation at many Russian public events, a function that—according to the Committee to Protect Journalists—has drawn criticism from independent reporters who view the accreditation regime as politicised.

== Leadership ==
Veteran Pravda reporter Vsevolod Bogdanov led the union from 1992 until 2017. The XII Congress on 25 November 2017 elected television anchor Vladimir Gennadyevich Solovyov as chair; he secured a second term in October 2022 and currently heads a secretariat that includes academics from Lomonosov Moscow State University and editors at state broadcasters.

== Headquarters ==
The national secretariat occupies offices at 4 Zubovsky Boulevard in central Moscow, a Soviet-era press centre transferred rent-free by presidential decree in 1993; periodic eviction threats—most notably in 2015—were condemned by Reporters Without Borders but ultimately rescinded by the Moscow mayor’s office.

== International relations and suspension ==
RUJ joined the International Federation of Journalists (IFJ) in 1995 and for nearly three decades was one of its largest fee-paying members. On 22 February 2023 the IFJ executive suspended the Russian union, ruling that the creation of RUJ branches in territories occupied during the invasion of Ukraine “shattered solidarity” among member unions. Associated Press coverage noted that Nordic affiliates had threatened to quit unless action was taken. RUJ chair Vladimir Solovyov condemned the move as “purely political,” while The Moscow Times reported that permanent expulsion remained under discussion.

In May 2026, RUJ was expelled from the International Federation of Journalists because of its close cooperation with the state and the establishment of branches in the occupied territories of Ukraine, the decision was endorsed by the National Union of Journalists of Ukraine.

== Press-freedom debates ==
While RUJ frequently provides legal support after assaults on reporters and maintains regional safety programmes, its proximity to state media has drawn criticism from international watchdogs. The Committee to Protect Journalists has characterised its public interventions on censorship as “consistently pro-Kremlin,” citing the union’s 2022 request that regulators sanction YouTube for blocking Russian state channels. Researchers at the Royal United Services Institute also note that RUJ keeps a memorial roll of slain reporters, estimating roughly 250 Russian journalists killed since 1991.

== Awards ==
Since 1996 RUJ has administered the Golden Pen of Russia, widely regarded inside the profession as the country’s highest journalism accolade; laureates are honoured each February at a televised press ball in Moscow. Regional competitions such as Economic Revival of Russia and youth contests are run with partners including the Chamber of Commerce and universities to channel promising graduates into newsroom internships.
