= Nina Yefimova =

Russian journalist (1971–1996)

Nina Yefimova (c. 1971 — May 9, 1996, Russia, Chechnya, Grozny) was a reporter for Vozrozhdeniye ("Revival"), a local Russian language newspaper in the Chechen capital Grozny. She was the 18th journalist to be killed in Chechnya since fighting escalated in December 1994.

On May 9, 1996, Nina Yefimova, 25-year-old, was found dead from a shot to the back of the head. Her 73-year-old mother was also killed, after they were both abducted from their apartment on the outskirts of Grozny. Yefimova's body was found the following morning in Grozny's Leninsky District, while her mother's was found that evening in a deserted canned food factory in Grozny.

Journalists in Grozny and Moscow believe that her murder was related to stories she had published on crime in Chechnya. A local law enforcement official who declined to give reporters his name claimed that the murder was committed "for private reasons." Yefimova's newspaper described as "relatively independent" by the Glasnost Defence Foundation, a Moscow media watchdog group. At this time, all media in Chechnya were controlled by the Moscow-installed government of Doku Zavgayev.

== See also ==
- Nadezhda Chaikova
- Anna Politkovskaya
