= Dmitry Kholodov =

Russian investigative journalist assassinated in Moscow (1967–1994)

- Дмитрий Холодов
- Kholodov in 1994
- Born: Dmitry Yuryevich Kholodov; 21 June 1967; Zagorsk, Russian SFSR, Soviet Union
- Died: 17 October 1994 (aged 27); Moscow, Russia
- Education: Moscow Engineering Physics Institute
- Occupation: Journalist

Dmitry Yuryevich Kholodov (Russian: Дмитрий Юрьевич Холодов; 21 June 1967 – 17 October 1994) was a Russian journalist who investigated corruption in the military and was assassinated on 17 October 1994 in Moscow. His assassination was the first of many killings of journalists in Russia.

== Early life and education ==
Kholodov was born in Zagorsk (now Sergiyev Posad) on 21 June 1967. He studied physics.

== Career ==
Kholodov began his working life alongside his parents at the defence industry institute in Klimovsk in the Moscow Region. Trained as a physicist at the Moscow Engineering Physics Institute, he initially faced limited prospects in the scientific field. Seeking a new path, Kholodov transitioned into journalism, first working for the local radio. In 1992, he became a reporter with the national Moskovsky Komsomolets daily newspaper.

In 1993, Kholodov travelled to hotspots around the former Soviet Union, reporting for Moskovsky Komsomolets. In particular, he was in Abkhazia during the Georgian-Abkhaz conflict and, as he witnessed the ethnic cleansing of Georgians in Abkhazia, sent many detailed reports, including one entitled "Sukhumi apocalypse".

In October 1993, Kholodov interviewed Defence Minister Pavel Grachev. For the next twelve months, on the basis of leaks from army and Ministry of Defence sources, he wrote and published numerous articles about high-level corruption in the military, especially concerning the misuse of funds intended to ease the withdrawal and resettlement of half a million former Soviet troops and their families who had been based in East Germany. Kholodov was due to speak at Duma hearings into these allegations, which supposedly reached as high as the defence minister himself, when he was murdered. None of the allegations were ever tested in court. Grachev was replaced as Defence Minister in 1996 after the end of the First Chechen War.

== Assassination ==
Kholodov died on 17 October 1994 when he opened a booby-trapped briefcase in his newspaper's offices. He had picked up the case that morning from the left-luggage section at a Moscow train station after being told it contained documents exposing corruption in the armed forces. The editors of Kholodov's daily, Moskovsky Komsomolets, accused the Russian military leadership (Defence Minister Grachev in particular) of ordering the killing. The military denied involvement. Speaking as a witness in court some six years later, Pavel Grachev claimed that "some of my subordinates misunderstood my words".

Local and foreign correspondents had already died in Moscow and elsewhere in the country (see List of journalists killed in Russia), but this was the first indisputable targeting of a journalist for their work. Kholodov's murder sent shockwaves through Russia's media community. Reaction abroad was muted, apart from professional media monitors and human rights organisations, and after December 1994 his killing was overshadowed by the onset of the First Chechen War. Kholodov's violent death personalized the risk faced by reporters in Russia, and the long drawn-out investigation and subsequent failure to convict the suspects had a chilling effect on investigative journalism in the country's newly free media.

The case remains unique in one aspect. With one exception (Oleg Sedinko in 2002), explosives have never again been used to kill a journalist in Russia; and unlike the ongoing spate of contract killings, no evidence was presented in court that money had been paid to Kholodov's alleged killers. They were acting, apparently, to avoid the displeasure of their superiors and to advance their careers.

== Trial and acquittal ==
The trial of six defendants, four of them serving military officers, began in 2000 at the Moscow District Military Court (see Russian courts). They were acquitted in 2002 and again, after a second trial, in 2004. On both occasions the Prosecutor General's Office protested against the verdict to the Russian Supreme Court.

Kholodov's elderly parents and their lawyers alleged improprieties in the conduct of the trial and the behaviour of the different judges presiding over the two trials (the second of whom, Yevgeny Zubov, would be in charge of the trial of Anna Politkovskaya's alleged killers). An attempt was made to have a complaint about the lack of a fair trial examined before the European Court of Human Rights in Strasbourg. It was rejected on the grounds that the murder preceded Russia's full accession to the Convention for the Protection of Human Rights and Fundamental Freedoms in 1998. By 2004, the killing was also technically beyond the statute of limitation for murder laid down in Russia's 1960 Criminal Code. Speaking in Germany in 2008, however, President Dmitry Medvedev said that the killings of certain journalists were of such importance that there should be no time limit for the prosecution of those responsible. Kholodov's case was still unsolved as of 2009.

== See also ==
- List of unsolved murders (1980–1999)
