= Abdulla Alishayev =

Russian journalist and writer

- Абдулла Алишаев
- Born: Abdulla Telman Alishayev; 1969; Makhachkala, Dagestan
- Died: 2 September 2008 (aged 38–39); Central Republican Clinical Hospital, Makhachkala, Dagestan
- Occupation: Journalist
- Employer: TV-Chirkei
- Known for: documentary Ordinary Wahhabism (2006)

Abdulla Telman Alishayev (Russian: Абдулла Тельман Алишаев; died 2 September 2008) was a Russian Dagestani journalist and writer. Alishayev was the television host of a popular mainstream Islamic television station in the Republic of Dagestan, a multi-ethnic Russian republic within the Caucasus region.

== Career ==
Alishayev hosted a popular Islamic themed television program called Peace to Your Home, which aired on TV Chirkey (TV-Chirkei), a mainstream Muslim television station. He was a prominent opponent of fundamentalist Islam within Dagestan and Russia. He had recently hosted and aired a documentary on TV Chirkey criticizing radical forms of Islam. Alishayev was particularly critical of Wahhabism, which had taken root in neighboring Chechnya, and actively advocated for more moderate forms of Islam.

== Death ==
Alishayev was shot in the head and shoulder by two unknown assailants while driving his car on the evening of 2 September 2008. The attack took place in the Dagestani capital city, Makhachkala. He was rushed to Makhachkala's Central Hospital, where he was operated on. However, Alishayev died on 3 September 2008. His funeral was attended by over 1,000 people.

Alishayev's killing came less than three days after the police shooting of journalist and businessman Magomed Yevloyev, the owner of Ingushetiya.ru, in the nearby Republic of Ingushetia.

== Reaction ==
U.S. State Department spokesman Sean McCormack said of the killing of Alishayev that "There needs to be people held to account for what happened. There is in Russia itself, unfortunately, a sad recent history of violence against journalists who are merely seeking to do their job. And the kinds of threats, intimidation, and violence that's used against a free press or those seeking to work in a free press in Russia have been unacceptable."
