= Sokolov (surname) =

Sokolov (Соколо́в, masculine) or Sokolova (Соколо́ва, feminine) is one of the top ten most common Russian family names. The name derives from the Russian word "Со́кол" (sokol, meaning "falcon"). It may appear in Germanized form as Sokoloff or Sokolow. Notable people with the surname include:

- Aleksandr Sokolov (disambiguation), several people
- Aleksey Sokolov (born 1979), Russian marathon runner
- Alexei Sokolov (born 1979), Russian pair skating coach and former competitor
- Alexey Mikhailovich Sokolov (born 1972), Russian leading scientist
- Andrei Sokolov (disambiguation), several people
- Anna Sokolova (born 2004), Cypriot rhythmic gymnast
- Apostol Sokolov (1917–1987), Bulgarian football goalkeeper
- Arseny Sokolov (1910–1986), Russian physicist, coauthor of Sokolov–Ternov effect
- Artyom Sokolov (born 2003), Russian football player
- Bakhadur Sokolov (born 2000), Russian football player
- Boris Sokolov (disambiguation), several people
- Darko Sokolov (born 1986), Macedonian basketball player
- Denis Sokolov, several people
- Dmitri Sokolov (disambiguation), several people
- Egor Sokolov (born 2000), Russian ice hockey left winger
- Ekaterina Sokolova (born 1990), figure skater
- Elena Sokolova (disambiguation), several people
- Eugene Sokolov (1920–2008), Russian neuroscientist
- Eva Sokolova (born 1961), Russian hurdler
- Evgenia Sokolova (1850–1925), Russian dancer and educator
- Evgeny Sokolov (born 1984) Russian cyclist
- Fedor Sokolov (born 1984), Israeli pair skater
- Georgi Sokolov (1942–2002), Bulgarian footballer
- Grigory Sokolov (born 1950), Russian pianist
- Igor Sokolov (born 1958), Soviet sport shooter
- Igor Sokolov (scientist), Russian scientist
- Ivan Sokolov, several people
- John Sokolov (1877–1968), bishop of the Russian Orthodox Church
- Juliana Sokolová (born 1981), Slovak writer, poet and philosopher
- Kateřina Sokolová (born 1989), Czech fashion model and beauty pageant titleholder
- Konstantin Sokolov (born 1991), Russian ice hockey player
- Kirill Sokolov (1930–2004), Russian artist
- Lale Sokolov (1916–2006), the tattooist of Auschwitz
- Larisa Sokolova, Russian musicologist
- Lisa Sokolov (born 1954), American jazz singer
- Lydia Sokolova (1896–1974), English ballerina
- Lyubov Sokolova (disambiguation), several people
- Lyudmila Sokolova, Soviet actress
- Maksim Sokolov (born 1968), Russian economist and politician
- Marina Sokolova (born 1969), German chess player
- Maxim Sokolov (born 1972), Russian ice hockey player
- Mihail Sokolov (born 1959), Russian scientist and surgeon
- Mikhail Sokolov (1885–1947), Russian painter, graphic artist and illustrator
- Mykhaylo Sokolov (born 1967), Ukrainian politician
- Nadezhda Sokolova (born 1996), Russian freestyle wrestler
- Narina Sokolova, Russian-born American animation artist
- Natalya Sokolova (disambiguation), several people
- Nikolay Sokolov (disambiguation), several people
- Oksana Sokolova (born 1971), Ukrainian journalist, television producer and television presenter
- Oleg Sokolov (born 1956), Russian historian
- Olga Sokolova (disambiguation), several people
- Pavel Sokolov (disambiguation), several people
- Penka Sokolova (1946–c. 1977), Bulgarian hurdler
- Petar Sokolov (c. 1870–1901), Bulgarian revolutionary
- Petr Sokolov, Russian rugby league footballer
- Pyotr Sokolov (disambiguation), several people
- Raymond Sokolov (born 1941), American culinary journalist
- Renat Sokolov (born 1984), Russian football player
- Sasha Sokolov (born 1943), Russian writer
- Saška Sokolov, Serbian athlete
- Sergei Sokolov (disambiguation), several people
- Stanislav Sokolov (born 1947), Russian animator
- Svetlana Sokolova (born 1981), Russian heptathlete
- Toma Sokolov (1938–2011), Bulgarian sprint canoer
- Tomčo Sokolov (born 1984), Macedonian basketball power forward
- Tsvetan Sokolov (born 1989), Bulgarian volley player
- Valerian Sokolov (born 1946), Soviet former bantamweight Olympic-class boxer
- Valeriy Sokolov (born 1986), Ukrainian violinist
- Vanya Sokolova (born 1971), Bulgarian volleyball player
- Vasily Sokolov, multiple people
- Věra Sokolová, Czech academic
- Vera Sokolova (born 1987), Russian race walker
- Victor Sokolov (1947–2006), Russian-American dissident journalist and priest
- Victor Sokolov, alias of spy Anatoly Gurevich
- Viktor Sokolov (disambiguation), several people
- Vladimir Sokolov (disambiguation), several people
- Vladislav Sokolov (1908–1993), Soviet choir conductor and composer, People's Artist of the USSR
- Vlatko Sakolov (born 1973), Macedonian wrestler
- Vyacheslav Sokolov (1941–2024), Russian engineer and politician
- Yanina Sokolova (born 1984), Ukrainian journalist, activist, television presenter and actress
- Yefrem Sokolov (1926–2022), leader of the Byelorussian SSR
- Yegor Sokolov (1750–1824), Russian architect
- Yevgeny Sokolov (born 1931), Lithuanian middle-distance runner
- Yevgeny Gavrilovich Sokolov (1880–1949), Russian artist
- Yordan Sokolov (1933–2016), Bulgarian jurist and politician
- Yury Sokolov (disambiguation), several people

== Fictional characters ==
- Sokolov, former Russian Spetsnaz in Neal Stephenson's novel Reamde
- Dr.Sokolov, a character in Ivan Vazov's novel Under the Yoke
- Andrey Sokolov, the main character of the Russian writer Mikhail Sholokhov's short story The Fate of Man
- Game characters:
  - Aleksandr Sokolov, a character from Call of Duty: Finest Hour.
  - Nikolai Stepanovich Sokolov from Metal Gear Solid 3
  - Anton Sokolov, Head of the Academy and Royal Physician in the game Dishonored
  - Ivan Sokolov, a Russian Greco-Roman wrestler from Buriki One
