= Sergei Sokolov =

Sergei Sokolov may refer to:

- Sergei Sokolov (marshal) (1911–2012), Soviet marshal
- Sergei Sokolov (footballer, born 1977), Azerbaijani football defender
- Sergei Sokolov (footballer, born 1980), Russian football defender
- Sergei Sokolov (footballer, born 1986), Russian football defender
- Sergei Sokolov (journalist) (born 1968) Russian journalist and editor

== See also ==
- Sokolov (surname)
