= Anna Politkovskaya =

Russian journalist (1958–2006)

- Анна Политковская
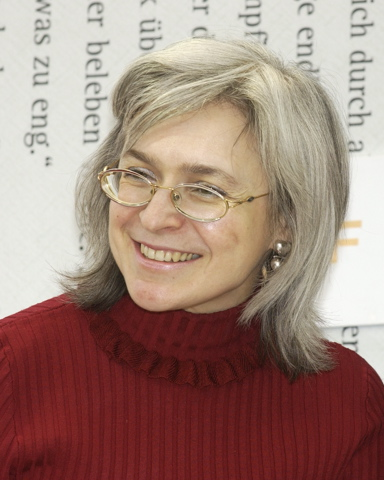
- Politkovskaya in 2005
- Born: Anna Stepanovna Mazepa; 30 August 1958; New York City, U.S.
- Died: 7 October 2006 (aged 48); Moscow, Russia
- Cause of death: Assassination
- Resting place: Troyekurovskoye Cemetery, Moscow
- Citizenship: Russia; United States
- Education: Moscow State University
- Occupation: Journalist
- Spouse: Alexander Politkovsky (m. 1978)
- Children: 2
- Writing career
- Period: 1982–2006
- Subjects: Politics; freedom of the press; human rights; social issues

Anna Stepanovna Politkovskaya (Note: Russian: Анна Степановна Политковская, pronounced [ˈanːə sʲtʲɪˈpanəvnə pəlʲɪtˈkofskəjə]; Ukrainian: Ганна Степанівна Політковська, romanized: Hanna Stepanivna Politkovska, pronounced [ˈɦɑnːɐ steˈpɑn⁽ʲ⁾iu̯nɐ pol⁽ʲ⁾itˈkɔu̯sʲkɐ].) (née Mazepa; (Note: Мазепа, Russian: [mɐˈzʲepə], Ukrainian: [mɐˈzɛpɐ].) 30 August 1958 – 7 October 2006) was a Russian investigative journalist who reported on political and social events in Russia, in particular, the Second Chechen War (1999–2005). She was found murdered in the elevator of her apartment block in Moscow on 7 October 2006, the 54th birthday of Russian president Vladimir Putin.

It was her reporting from Chechnya that made her national and international reputation. For seven years, she refused to give up reporting on the war despite numerous acts of intimidation and violence. Politkovskaya was arrested by Russian military forces in Chechnya and subjected to a mock execution. She was poisoned while flying from Moscow via Rostov-on-Don to help resolve the 2004 Beslan school hostage crisis, and had to turn back, requiring careful medical treatment in Moscow to restore her health.

Her post-1999 articles about conditions in Chechnya were turned into books several times; Russian readers' main access to her investigations and publications was through Novaya Gazeta, a Russian newspaper that featured critical investigative coverage of Russian political and social affairs. From 2000 onwards, she received numerous international awards for her work. In 2004, she published Putin's Russia, a personal account of Russia for a Western readership.

On 7 October 2006 (the 54th birthday of Russian president Vladimir Putin), she was murdered in the elevator of her block of apartments, an assassination that attracted international attention. In 2014, five men were sentenced to prison for the murder, but it is still unclear who ordered or paid for the contract killing.

== Early life and education ==
Anna Stepanovna Mazepa was born in New York City in 1958, (Note: One source gives her birth name as Hanna Mazeppa. Another source states that she was born in Chernihiv region of Ukraine.) the daughter of Ukrainian Soviet diplomats at the United Nations, Stepan Fedorovich Mazepa (1927–2006) from Kostobobriv, and Raisa Aleksandrovna (née Novikova; 1929–2021) from Kerch in Crimea. Her father was ethnically Ukrainian and had attended a Ukrainian-language school in Chernihiv before the 1941 Nazi invasion of the USSR. He met her mother at a Russian-language night school in Kerch after the war while serving in the fleet. (Note: An online bio says both her parents were "of Ukrainian heritage".) By 1952, her father was admitted to study at an institute in Moscow, and her parents married there. Her father was appointed to the Ukrainian delegation at the United Nations during the Khrushchev era. He became a founding member of the Special Committee against Apartheid in 1962, and served as its secretary as late as 1974.

Her parents bought an apartment in central Moscow in 1962 and Politkovskaya mostly grew up there. She attended a music school and trained figure skating; according to her mother, she was noted for her frequent use of the local Krupskaya Library. She graduated from Moscow State University's school of journalism in 1980 with a thesis about the poetry of Marina Tsvetaeva. The faculty head at the time was Yasen Zasurskii, a close friend of the Mazepas and their frequent guest in New York. She married fellow student Alexander Politkovsky in 1978; by 1981 they had two children, Ilya and Vera. At first Alexander was better known, joining television journalist Vladislav Listyev as one of the hosts on the late-night television program Vzglyad. Apart from her childhood years, Politkovskaya spent no more than a few weeks outside Russia at any one time, even when her life came under threat. Born in USA, she was a U.S. citizen and had a U.S. passport, however, she never relinquished her Russian citizenship.

== Journalistic work ==
=== Beginnings ===
Politkovskaya's initial employment was with Izvestia, the organ of the Supreme Soviet of the Soviet Union, in 1982. According to her ex-husband in 2011, it was a brief internship in the mailroom (Note: Other sources say that she wrote for the newspaper, or that she joined the editorial staff.) and her only journalistic engagement during the 1980s as he failed to assist her career. In her son's words, until the mid-1990s she "wasn't even a journalist, she was a housewife". Her own later account stated that "Sasha's work ... kept me from doing my own thing". She is said by Politkovsky to have worked temporarily as a cleaner at the Mayakovsky Theatre. However, after the spell at Izvestia she soon held another internship at the Vozdushnyi transport (Воздушный транспорт, the in-house magazine of the Ministry of Civil Aviation), as a reporter and editor of the Aeroflot emergencies and accidents section. As recalled by Politkovsky, her first travel assignment was on the plane crash in Omsk (1984). The correspondent role came with an unlimited air ticket, which enabled her to travel widely across the country and observe Russian society. She was privy to developments in the media sphere through her husband, "Russia's number one television journalist" from 1987 onwards, and shared his political interests. In the 1990 film about the Politkovsky family, she was portrayed as her husband's "assistant". By the time of the dissolution of the Soviet Union in 1991, she experienced threats against their family, which forced her teenage son's exile in London in 1992. She was a columnist for the socio-political newspaper Megapolis-Express, founded in 1990, before it turned into a tabloid serving fake news in September 1994. She was professionally involved in the creative union Eskart – which by 1991 offered advertising services through its partnership with major media outlets, such as the All-Union Radio, the organ of the Ministry of Railways Gudok, Kuranty, Literaturnaya Gazeta, Moskovskiye Novosti, My, Ogoniok, Oktyabr, Sovetskaya Kultura, Stolitsa, and Trud – and in the St Petersburg publishing house Paritet, founded in 1992.

Politkovskaya's career took off with the decline of her husband's influence following the 1993 Russian constitutional crisis. From 1994 to 1999, she worked as the assistant chief editor of Obshchaya Gazeta, headed by Yegor Yakovlev, where she wrote frequently about social problems, particularly the plight of refugees. From June 1999 to 2006, she wrote columns for the biweekly Novaya Gazeta, a newspaper with strong investigative reporting that was critical of the new post-Soviet regime from the outset. She published several award-winning books about Chechnya, life in Russia, and Russia under Vladimir Putin, including Putin's Russia.

=== Reports from Chechnya ===
External videos
- Interview with Politkovskaya about her experiences covering war in Chechnya, hosted by Radio Free Europe/Radio Liberty, 20 November 2001, C-SPAN

Politkovskaya won awards for her work. She used each of these occasions to urge greater concern and responsibility by Western governments that, after the September 11 attacks on the United States, welcomed Putin's contribution to their "war on terror". She talked to officials, the military and the police and also frequently visited hospitals and refugee camps in Chechnya and in neighboring Ingushetia to interview those injured and uprooted by the renewed fighting.

In numerous articles critical of the war in Chechnya and the pro-Russian regime there, Politkovskaya described alleged abuses committed by Russian military forces, Chechen rebels, and the Russian-backed administration led by Akhmad Kadyrov and his son Ramzan Kadyrov. She also chronicled human rights abuses and policy failures elsewhere in the North Caucasus. In one characteristic instance in 1999, she not only wrote about the plight of an ethnically-mixed old peoples' home under bombardment in Grozny, but helped to secure the safe evacuation of its elderly inhabitants with the aid of her newspaper and public support. Her articles, many of which form the basis of A Dirty War (2001) and A Small Corner of Hell (2003), depict a conflict that brutalized both Chechen fighters and conscript soldiers in the federal army, and created hell for the civilians caught between them.

As Politkovskaya reported, the order supposedly restored under the Kadyrovs became a regime of endemic torture, abduction, and murder, by either the new Chechen authorities or the various federal forces based in Chechnya. One of her last investigations was into the alleged mass poisoning of Chechen schoolchildren by a strong and unknown chemical substance which incapacitated them for many months.

=== Criticism of Vladimir Putin and FSB ===
After Politkovskaya became widely known in the West, she was commissioned to write Putin's Russia (later subtitled Life in a Failing Democracy), a broader account of her views and experiences after former KGB lieutenant colonel Vladimir Putin became Boris Yeltsin's Prime Minister, and then succeeded him as President of Russia. This included Putin's pursuit of the Second Chechen War. In the book, she accused the Russian Federal Security Service (FSB) of stifling all civil liberties to establish a Soviet-style dictatorship, but admitted:

[It] is we who are responsible for Putin's policies ... [s]ociety has shown limitless apathy ... [a]s the Chekists have become entrenched in power, we have let them see our fear, and thereby have only intensified their urge to treat us like cattle. The KGB respects only the strong. The weak it devours. We of all people ought to know that.

She also wrote:

We are hurtling back into a Soviet abyss, into an information vacuum that spells death from our own ignorance. All we have left is the internet, where information is still freely available. For the rest, if you want to go on working as a journalist, it's total servility to Putin. Otherwise, it can be death, the bullet, poison, or trial—whatever our special services, Putin's guard dogs, see fit.

"People often tell me that I am a pessimist, that I don't believe in the strength of the Russian people, that I am obsessive in my opposition to Putin and see nothing beyond that", she opens an essay titled "Am I Afraid?", finishing it—and the book—with the words "If anybody thinks they can take comfort from the 'optimistic' forecast, let them do so. It is certainly the easier way, but it is the death sentence for our grandchildren."

=== A Russian Diary ===
In May 2007, Random House posthumously published Politkovskaya's A Russian Diary, containing extracts from her notebook and other writings. Subtitled A Journalist's Final Account of Life, Corruption, and Death in Putin's Russia, the book gives her account of the period from December 2003 to August 2005, including what she described as "the death of Russian parliamentary democracy", the Beslan school hostage crisis, and the "winter and summer of discontent" from January to August 2005. Because she was murdered "while translation was being completed, final editing had to go ahead without her help", wrote translator Arch Tait in a note to the book.

"Who killed Anna and who lay beyond her killer remains unknown", wrote Jon Snow, the main news anchor for the United Kingdom's Channel 4 in his foreword to the book's UK edition. "Her murder robbed too many of us of absolutely vital sources of information and contact", he concluded, "Yet it may, ultimately, be seen to have at least helped prepare the way for the unmasking of the dark forces at the heart of Russia's current being. I must confess that I finished reading A Russian Diary feeling that it should be taken up and dropped from the air in vast quantities throughout the length and breadth of Mother Russia, for all her people to read."

== Attempted hostage negotiations ==
Politkovskaya was closely involved in attempts to negotiate the release of hostages in the Moscow theatre hostage crisis of 2002. When the Beslan school hostage crisis erupted in the North Caucasus in early September 2004, Politkovskaya attempted to fly there to act as a mediator, but was taken off the plane, acutely ill due to an attempted poisoning, in Rostov-on-Don (see #Poisoning).

== Access to Russian authorities ==
In Moscow, Politkovskaya was not invited to press conferences or gatherings that Kremlin officials might attend, in case the organizers were suspected of harboring sympathies toward her. Despite this, many top officials allegedly talked to her when she was writing articles or conducting investigations. According to one of her articles, they did talk to her, "but only when they weren't likely to be observed: outside in crowds, or in houses that they approached by different routes, like spies". She also stated that the Kremlin tried to block her access to information and discredit her:

I will not go into the other joys of the path I have chosen, the poisoning, the arrests, the threats in letters and over the Internet, the telephoned death threats, the weekly summons to the prosecutor general's office to sign statements about practically every article I write (the first question being, "How and where did you obtain this information?"). Of course I don't like the constant derisive articles about me that appear in other newspapers and on Internet sites presenting me as the madwoman of Moscow. I find it disgusting to live this way. I would like a bit more understanding.

== Death threats ==
After Politkovskaya's murder, Vyacheslav Izmailov, her colleague at Novaya Gazeta – a military man who had helped negotiate the release of dozens of hostages in Chechnya before 1999 – said that he knew of at least nine previous occasions when Politkovskaya had faced death, commenting "Frontline-soldiers do not usually go into battle so often and survive".

Politkovskaya herself did not deny being afraid, but felt responsible and concerned for her informants. While attending a December 2005 conference on the freedom of the press in Vienna organized by Reporters Without Borders, she said "People sometimes pay with their lives for saying aloud what they think. In fact, one can even get killed for giving me information. I am not the only one in danger. I have examples that prove it." She often received death threats as a result of her work, including being threatened with rape and experiencing a mock execution after being arrested by the military in Chechnya.

=== Detention in Chechnya ===
Early in 2001, Politkovskaya was detained by military officials in the southern mountain village of Khattuni. She was investigating complaints from 90 Chechen families about "punitive raids" by federal forces. She interviewed a Chechen grandmother, Rosita from the village of Tovzeni, who endured 12 days of beatings, electric shocks, and confinement in a pit. The men who arrested Rosita presented themselves as FSB-employees. The torturers requested a ransom from Rosita's relatives, who negotiated a smaller amount that they were able to pay. Another interviewee described killings and rapes of Chechen men in a "concentration camp with a commercial streak" near the village of Khattuni.

Upon leaving the camp, Politkovskaya was detained, interrogated, beaten, and humiliated: "The young officers tortured me, skillfully hitting my sore-spots. They looked through my children's pictures, making a point of saying what they would like to do to the kids. This went on for about three hours." She was subjected to a mock execution using a BM-21 Grad multiple-launch rocket system, then poisoned with a cup of tea that made her vomit. Her tape-records were confiscated. She described her mock execution:

A lieutenant colonel with a swarthy face and dull dark bulging eyes said in a businesslike tone: "Let's go. I'm going to shoot you." He led me out of the tent into complete darkness. The nights here are impenetrable. After we walked for a while, he said, "Ready or not, here I come." Something burst with pulsating fire around me, screeching, roaring, and growling. The lieutenant colonel was very happy when I crouched in fright. It turned out that he had led me right under the "Grad" rocket launcher at the moment it was fired.

After the mock execution, the Russian lieutenant colonel said to her: "Here's the banya. Take off your clothes." Seeing that his words had no effect, he got very angry: "A real lieutenant colonel is courting you, and you say no, you militant bitch."

In 2006, the European Court of Human Rights found the Russian Federation responsible for the forced disappearance of a suspected Ingush militant, Khadzhi-Murat Yandiev. Colonel-General Alexander Baranov, the commander of the Russian Caucasus deployment mentioned by Politkovskaya's camp guide as the one who ordered captured militants to be kept in the pits, was filmed as he ordered Yandiev to be executed.

=== Poisoning ===
While flying south in September 2004 to help negotiate with those who had taken over a thousand hostages in a school in Beslan (North Ossetia), Politkovskaya fell violently ill and lost consciousness after drinking tea given to her by an Aeroflot flight attendant. She had reportedly been poisoned, with some accusing the former Soviet secret police poison facility.

=== Threats from OMON officer ===
In 2001, Politkovskaya fled to Vienna, following e-mail threats that a police officer whom she had accused of atrocities against civilians in Chechnya was looking to take revenge. Corporal Sergey Lapin was arrested and charged in 2002, but the case against him was closed the following year. In 2005, Lapin was convicted and jailed for the torture and subsequent disappearance of a Chechen civilian detainee, the case exposed by Politkovskaya in her article "Disappearing People". A former fellow officer of Lapin's was among the suspects in Politkovskaya's murder, on the theory that the motive was revenge for her part in Lapin's conviction.

=== Conflict with Ramzan Kadyrov ===
In 2004, Politkovskaya had a conversation with Ramzan Kadyrov, then Prime Minister of Chechnya. One of his assistants said to her, "Someone ought to have shot you back in Moscow, right on the street, like they do in your Moscow". Kadyrov echoed him: "You're an enemy. To be shot...." On the day of her murder, said Novaya Gazeta's chief editor Dmitry Muratov, Politkovskaya had planned to file a lengthy story on the torture practices believed to be used by the Chechen security detachments known as Kadyrovites. In her final interview, she described Kadyrov—now president of Chechnya—as the "Chechen Stalin of our days".

== Assassination and investigation ==
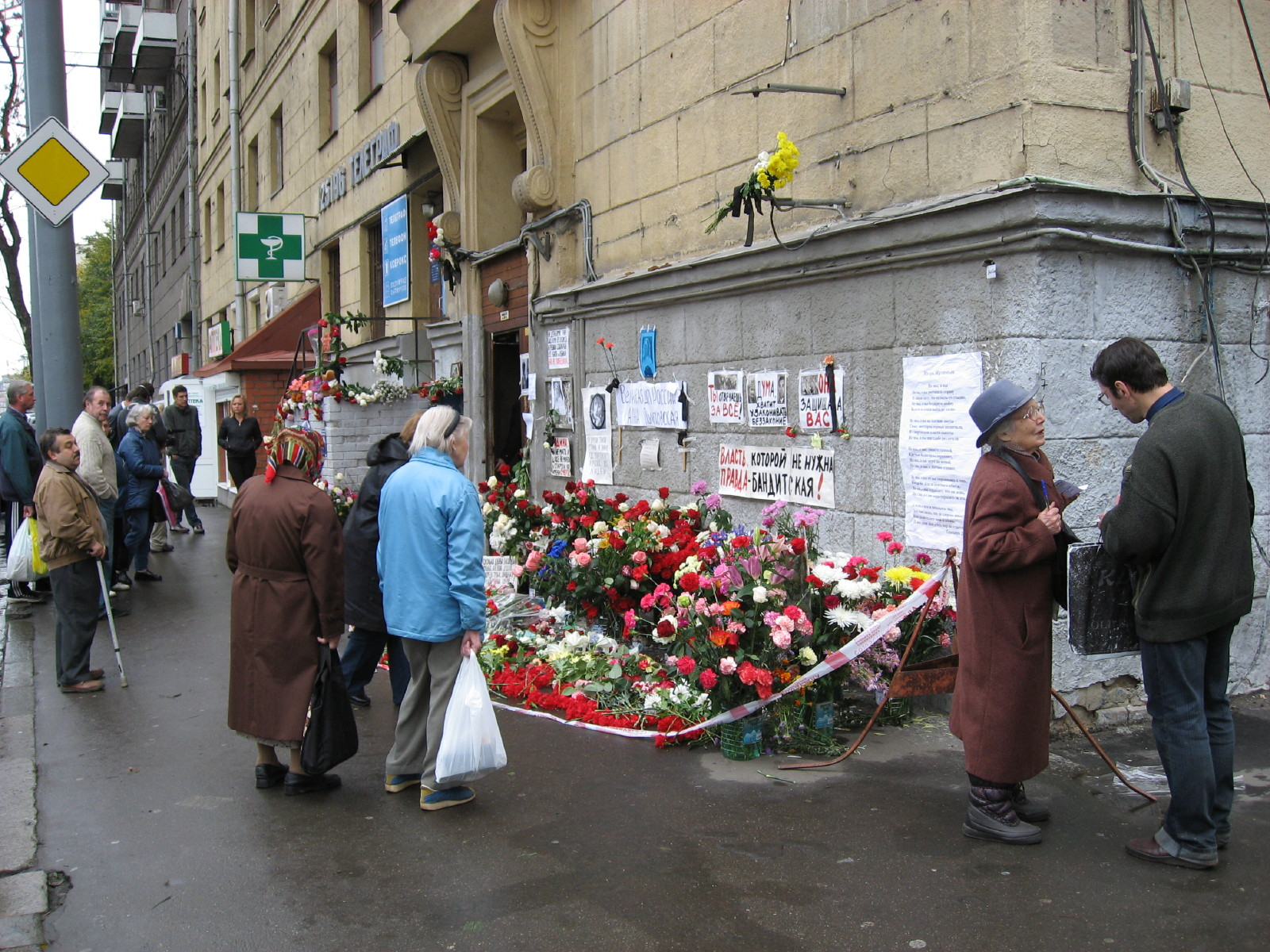
Memorial near her apartment, Moscow, 2006

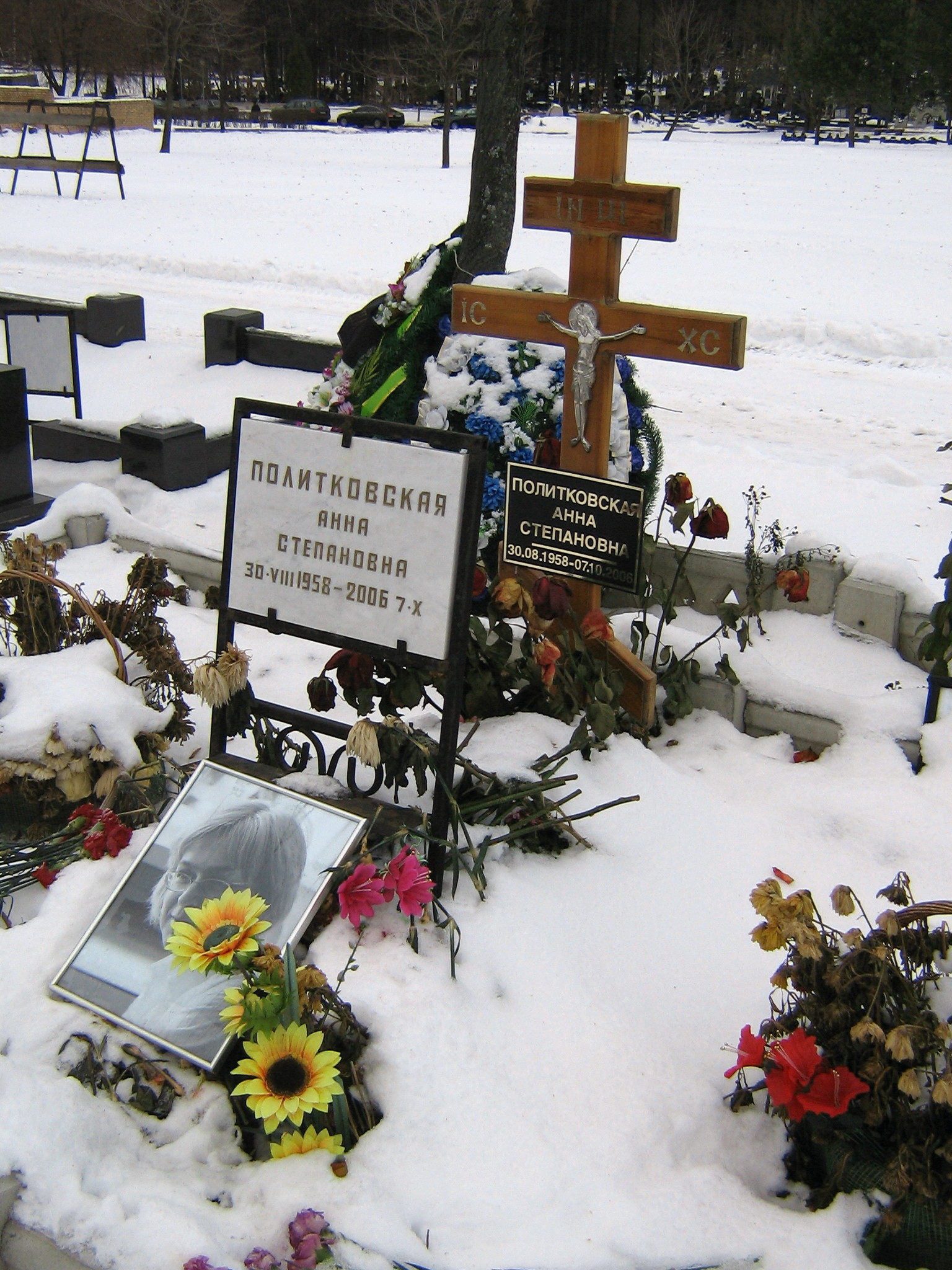
Grave of Anna Politkovskaya at the Troyekurovskoye Cemetery in Moscow

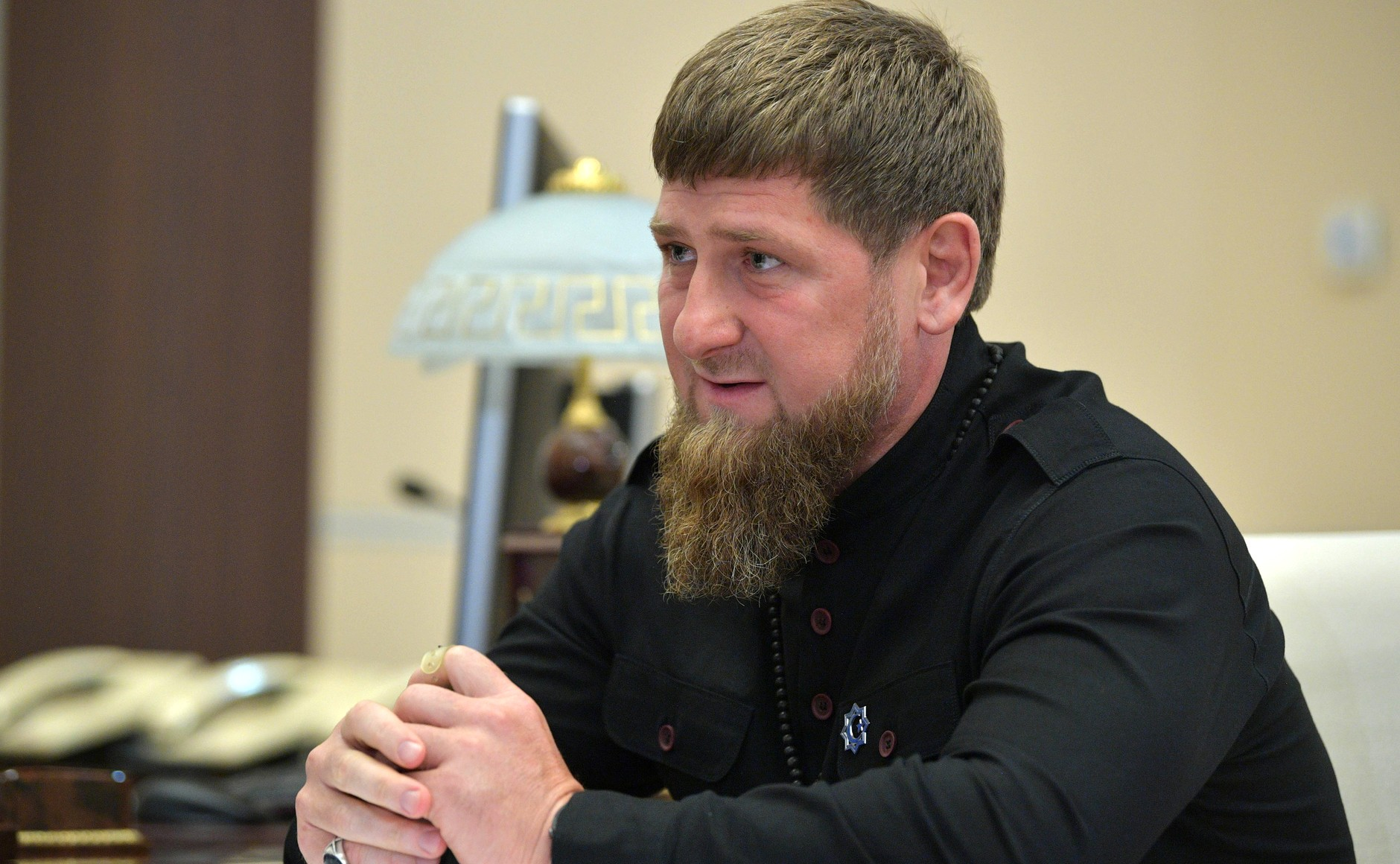
Some observers alleged that Chechen leader Ramzan Kadyrov or his men were behind the assassination of Politkovskaya.

Politkovskaya was found dead in the lift, in her block of apartments in central Moscow on 7 October 2006, Putin's birthday. She had been shot twice in the chest, once in the shoulder, and once in the head at close range. There was widespread international reaction to the assassination.

The funeral was held on 10 October 2006 at the Troyekurovskoye Cemetery in the outskirts of Moscow. Before Politkovskaya was buried, more than one thousand mourners filed past her coffin to pay their last respects. Dozens of Politkovskaya's colleagues, public figures, and admirers of her work gathered at the cemetery. No high-ranking Russian officials could be seen at the ceremony. Politkovskaya was buried near her father, who had died shortly before her.

In May 2007, a large posthumous collection of her articles entitled With Good Reason was published by Novaya Gazeta, and launched at the Gorbachev Foundation in Moscow. The event came soon after the birth of Anna's namesake grandchild: Vera's daughter was named Anna in honor of her grandmother. A few months later, 10 men were detained on suspicion of various degrees of involvement in Politkovskaya's murder. Four of them were brought before the Moscow District Military Court in October 2008.

=== First trial, 2008–2009 ===
Three men were charged with directly aiding Politkovskaya's killer, who was allegedly the brother of two of the suspects. There was insufficient evidence to charge the fourth man—an FSB colonel—with the murder, though he was suspected of a leading role in its organization; he stood trial at the same time for another offence. The case was held before a jury, and, after the jurors insisted, was open to the press and public.

On 25 November 2008, it was reported that Politkovskaya's murder might have been ordered by a politician inside Russia. Murad Musayev, a lawyer for the men on trial, told journalists that the case notes—as one of the interpretations of the crime—mentioned that a politician, based in Russia (but not named in those notes), was behind her death.

On 5 December 2008, Sergei Sokolov, a senior editor of Novaya Gazeta, testified in court that he had received information (from sources he would not name) that defendant Dzhabrail Makhmudov was an agent of the FSB. He said Makhmudov's uncle Lom-Ali Gaitukayev, who was serving a 12-year jail sentence for the attempted murder of a Ukrainian businessman, also worked for the FSB.

=== Following the acquittal ===
After all three men were acquitted of Politkovskaya's murder in February 2009, her children Vera and Ilya, their lawyers Karinna Moskalenko and Anna Stavitskaya, and senior Novaya Gazeta editor Sergei Sokolov gave their reaction to the trial at a press conference in Moscow. In his comments on the end of the trial, Andrew McIntosh, Chairman of the Parliamentary Assembly of the Council of Europe's Sub-Committee on the Media and Rapporteur on media freedom, expressed frustration at what he perceived to be a lack of progress in investigating the murder, or the inability of the Russian authorities to find her killers:

Two years ago, in its Resolution 1535 (2007), the Assembly called on the Russian Parliament closely to monitor the progress in the criminal investigations regarding the murder of Anna Politkovskaya and hold the authorities accountable for any failures to investigate or prosecute. The closure of the trial yesterday can only be regarded as a blatant failure. I call on the Russian authorities and Parliament to relaunch a proper investigation and shed light on this murder, which undermines not only freedom of expression in Russia, but also its democratic foundation based on the rule of law. There are no excuses for these flawed investigations into murders of politically critical journalists writing against corruption and crime within government, such as the murders of Georgy Gongadze in Ukraine in 2000 and Paul Klebnikov in Moscow in 2004.

Before the trial ended, Stanislav Markelov, a lawyer who had investigated many of the abuses documented by Politkovskaya, was assassinated in Moscow on 19 January 2009. Journalist Anastasia Baburova, who was with Markelov at the time, died later of injuries sustained while trying to intervene.

More closely related to Politkovskaya's work as a journalist was 15 July 2009 murder of Natalia Estemirova. A board member of the Memorial human rights society and one of Politkovskaya's key informants, guides, and colleagues in Chechnya, Estemirova was abducted in Grozny and found dead, several hours later, in the neighboring Republic of Ingushetia.

=== Retrial, 2012 and 2014 ===
On 5 August 2009, the prosecution service's objection to the acquittals in the Politkovskaya trial was upheld by the Supreme Court, and a new trial was ordered.

In August 2011, Russian prosecutors claimed they were close to solving the murder after detaining Dmitry Pavliuchenkov, a former policeman, who they alleged was the principal organizer. In December 2012, Dmitry Pavliutchenkov was found guilty and sentenced to 11 years in a high security penal colony.

In May 2014, five men were convicted of murdering Politkovskaya, including three defendants who had been acquitted in a previous trial. In June 2014 the men were sentenced to prison, two of them, Lom-Ali Gaitukayev and his nephew Rustam Makhmudov, receiving life sentences. It was unclear who ordered or paid for the contract killing.

=== Murder remained unsolved, 2016 ===
In September 2016, Vladimir Markin, official spokesman for the Investigative Committee, included Politkovskaya's killing in a list of the Most Dramatic Crimes in 21st century Russia and claimed that it had been solved. Her colleagues at Novaya Gazeta protested that until the instigator or sponsor of the crime was identified, arrested and prosecuted the case was not closed.

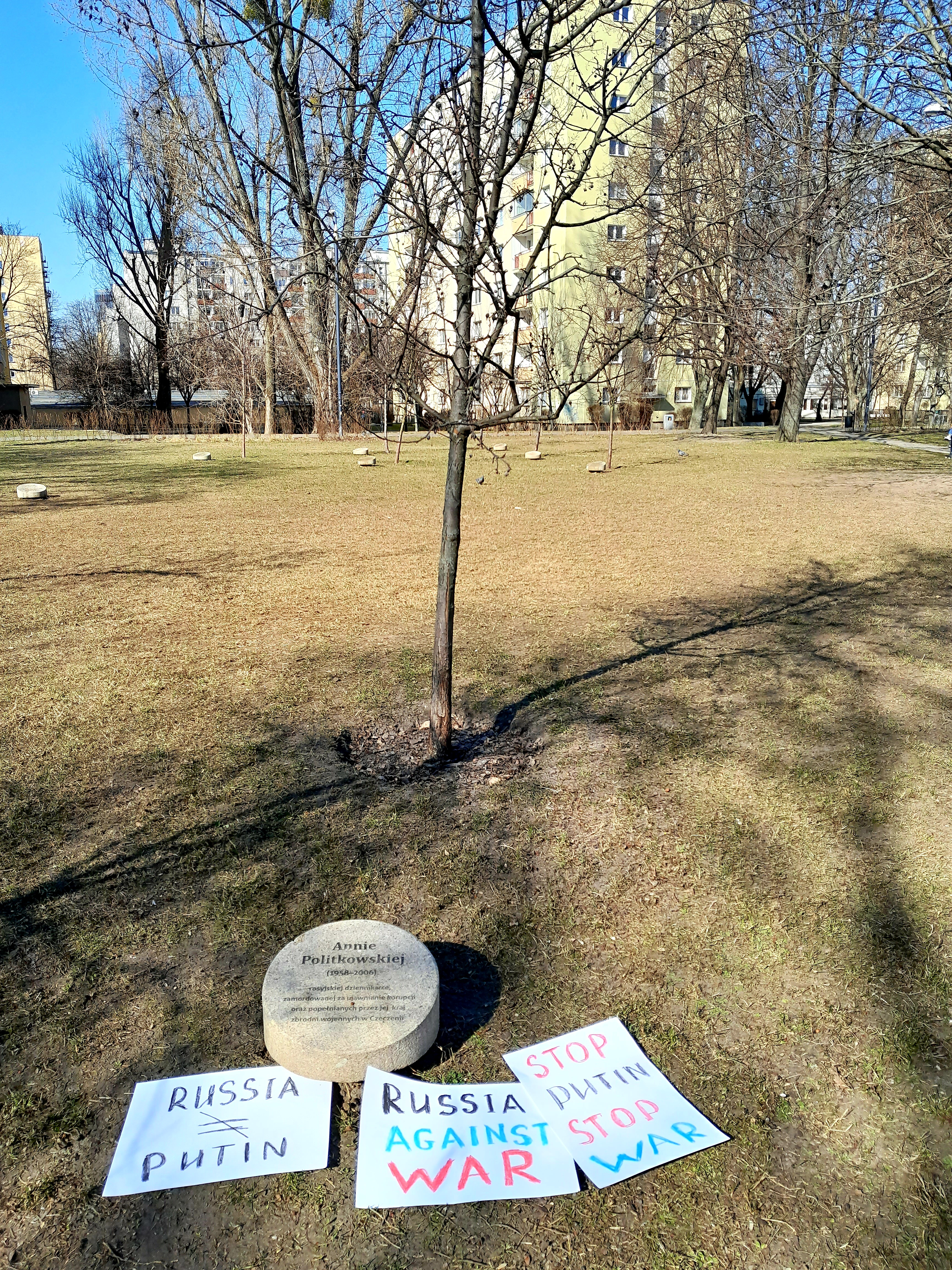
Slogans protesting the 2022 Russian invasion of Ukraine on a memorial to Politkovskaya at the Garden of the Righteous in Warsaw

On 7 October 2016, Novaya Gazeta released a video clip of its editors, correspondents, photographers and technical and administrative staff holding text-boards giving details of the case and stating, repeatedly, "The sponsor of Anna's murder has not been found". On the same day deputy chief editor Sergei Sokolov published a damning summary of the official investigation, describing its false turns and shortcomings, and emphasized that it had now effectively been wound up. After the three Makhmudov brothers, Khadjikurbanov and Lom-Ali Gaitukayev were convicted in 2014, wrote Sokolov, the once large team of investigators was reduced to one person and within a year he retired, to be replaced by a lower-ranking investigator. The 2000 killing of Igor Domnikov, another Novaya Gazeta journalist, showed that the perpetrators might be identified (they were convicted in 2008).

The Intercept published a top-secret document released by Edward Snowden with a screenshot of Intellipedia according to which:

(TS//SI/REL TO USA, AUS, CAN, GBR, NZL) Russian Federal Intelligence Services (probably FSB) are known to have targeted the webmail account of the murdered Russian journalist Anna Politkovskaya. On 5 December 2005, RFIS initiated an attack against the account annapolitovskaya@US Provider1, by deploying malicious software which is not available in the public domain. It is not known whether the attack is in any way associated with the death of the journalist.

== Documentary ==
- 2008, documentary by Masha Novikova Anna, Seven Years on the Frontline; 78 min., the Netherlands.
- In 2008, Swiss director Eric Bergkraut made a documentary, Letter to Anna, about Politkovskaya's life and death. It includes interviews with her son Ilya, her daughter Vera, her ex-husband Alexander Politkovsky, and others—such as businessman Boris Berezovsky and filmmaker Andrei Nekrasov.
- In 2011, Russian director Marina Goldovskaya made the documentary A Bitter Taste of Freedom, a Swedish-Russian-American co-production. The title refers to an earlier documentary film by the same director, A Taste of freedom (1991) which is about Russian life in the new, post-Soviet reality and features the Politkovsky family. A Bitter Taste of Freedom was shown at the 27th Warsaw International Film Festival where it won the Best Documentary Feature Award. From the festival's program:

She was brave, she was bold, and she was beautiful. In her fearless quest to uncover the wrongdoings of the Russian State, Anna Politkovskaya inspired awe in some and fear in countless others. An investigative journalist for Moscow's liberal Novaya Gazeta, she was the only spokesperson for victims of Putin's government. Hers was a lonely voice, yet loud enough for the entire country to hear. It was too loud. At age 48 she was assassinated for simply doing her job. A documentary about the bravery of the human spirit. As the director says, it "is especially important now, when the world is so full of cynicism and corruption, when we so desperately need more people with Anna's level of courage and integrity and commitment".

=== Biopic ===
Principal production on a biographical film, then entitled Anna, began in 2022, with Maxine Peake playing Politkovskaya and also featuring Jason Isaacs and Ciaran Hinds. Ultimately titled Words of War, it had a limited release that began on 2 May 2025.

== Awards and honours ==
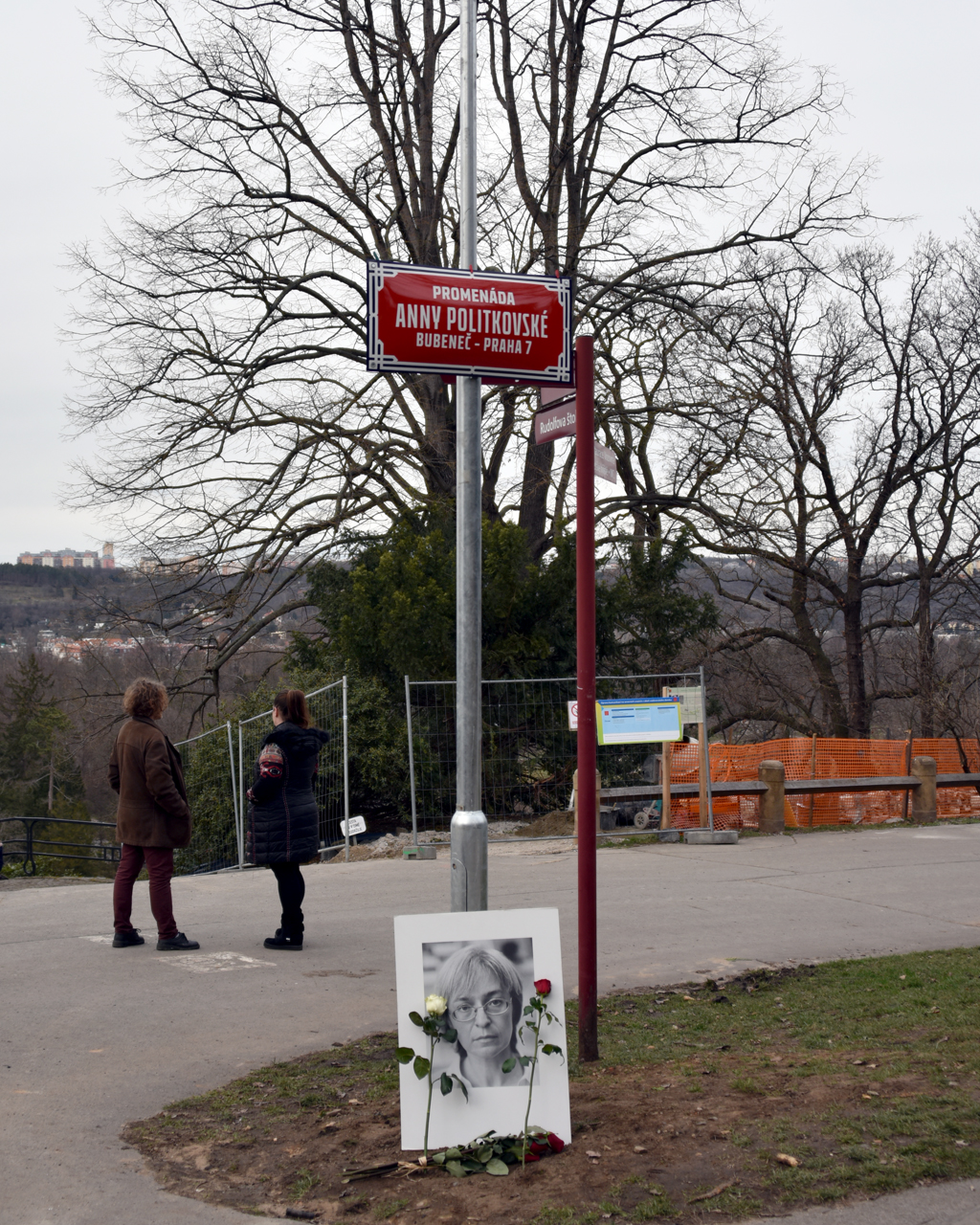
Anna Politkovskaya Promenade in Prague

- 2001: "Golden Pen Prize" of the Russian Union of Journalists
- 2001: Amnesty International Global Award for Human Rights Journalism
- 2002: Norwegian Authors Union Freedom of Expression Prize ("Ytringsfrihetsprisen")
- 2002: Index on Censorship Award for the "Defence of Free Expression".
- 2002: PEN American Center Freedom to Write Award
- 2002: International Women's Media Foundation Courage in Journalism Award
- 2003: Lettre Ulysses Award for the Art of Reportage
- 2003: Hermann Kesten Medal
- 2004: Olof Palme Prize (shared with Lyudmila Alexeyeva and Sergei Kovalev)
- 2004: Vázquez Montalbán Award of International Journalism
- 2005: Civil Courage Prize (with Min Ko Naing and Munir Said Thalib)
- 2005: Prize for the Freedom and Future of the Media
- 2006: International Journalism Award named after Tiziano Terzani
- 2006: World Press Freedom Hero of the International Press Institute
- 2007: UNESCO/Guillermo Cano World Press Freedom Prize (awarded posthumously for the first time)
- 2007: National Press Club (United States)/John Aubuchon Freedom of the Press Award (posthumous)
- 2007: Geschwister-Scholl-Preis (posthumous)
- 2007: Democracy Award to Spotlight Press Freedom by the National Endowment for Democracy,

The 2007–2008 academic year at the College of Europe was named in her honour.

=== Anna Politkovskaya Award ===
The international human rights organization RAW in WAR (Reach All Women in War), which focuses on supporting and protecting women human rights defenders working in war and conflict zones, established in 2006 the annual Anna Politkovskaya Award in Politkovskaya's honour. The award recognizes "a woman human rights defender from a conflict zone in the world who, like Anna, stands up for the victims of this conflict, often at great personal risk". Mariana Katzarova, a close friend and a human rights colleague of Politkovskaya, founded RAW in WAR (Reach All Women in WAR) and the Anna Politkovskaya Award in 2006 in London, after working as a journalist and human rights advocate in the war zones of Bosnia, Kosovo and the North Caucasus, including 10 years as the Russia Researcher for Amnesty International.

The award was first given on the first anniversary of Politkovskaya's murder, to her friend and colleague, Chechen activist Natalia Estemirova, who was herself abducted and killed in 2009 in Chechnya.

=== Journalism prize "Anna Politkovskaja" (Ferrara, Italy) ===
There is also a "Journalism-prize Anna Politkovskaja" ("il premio giornalistico Anna Politkovskaja"), which is annually awarded in Ferrara, Italy, by the magazine L'internationale and the comune of Ferrara.

Winners of the Journalism prize "Anna Politkovskaja"

- 2015: Asif Mohiuddin

== Works ==
- Politkovskaia, Anna (2000) Voyage en enfer: Journal de Tchetchenie, Robert Laffont: Paris.
- Politkovskaya, Anna (2001) A Dirty War: A Russian Reporter in Chechnya, Harvill: London.ISBN 9781860468971
- Политковская, Анна (2002) Вторая чеченская (The Second Chechen War), Zakharov: Moscow.
  - Politkovskaya, Anna (2003) A Small Corner of Hell: Dispatches from Chechnya, translation of Vtoraya chechenskaya, The University of Chicago Press. Retrieved 2015-02-28.
- Politkovs'ka, Anna. "Druha chechens'ka." Trans. I. Andrusiak. Kyiv: Diokor, 2004. (In Ukrainian.)
- Politkovskaya, Anna (2004) Putin's Russia, Harvill: London.ISBN 980293316-3
- Politkovskaya, Anna (2007) A Russian Diary: A Journalist's Final Account of Life, Corruption, and Death in Putin's Russia, Harvill Secker: London.ISBN 9781400066827
- Политковская, Анна (2007) (With Good Reason), Novaya Gazeta: Moscow; 989 pp.

Includes all Anna Politkovskaya's finished and unfinished articles for Novaya Gazeta
The Russian title makes grim play of the frequent disbelieving question of victims of the late 1930s Great Terror in the Soviet Union: "But whatever for?!" («За что?!»)

- Politkovskaya, Anna (2010) Nothing But the Truth: Selected Dispatches, Harvill Secker: London. ISBN 9781846552397

A 480-page selection from the 2007 volume За что (With Good Reason).

- Politkovskaya, Anna (2011) Is Journalism Worth Dying For?: Final Dispatches, Melville House Publishing: Brooklyn, New York.ISBN 9781935554400
- Politkovskaya, Anna (2026) The Essential Anna Politkovskaya, Penguin Random House UK. ISBN 978-1-78487-973-0

== See also ==
- Alexander Litvinenko
- List of journalists killed in Russia
- List of unsolved murders (2000–present)
- Petra Procházková
- Putinism

== Sources ==
- Finkelstein, David (2008), "Investigative Journalism: Elena Poniatowska (1932–) and Anna Politkovskaya (1958–2006)", Journalism Practice, 2 (1): 130–134, doi:10.1080/17512780701768576
- Jackman, Danielle Ilona (2016), Campaigning for Justice in Dark Times: Politkovskaya's Network and the Lapin Case, PhD thesis: La Trobe University, archived from the original on 11 June 2024
- Simon, Scott (2007), Foreword, A Russian Diary: A Journalist's Final Account of Life, Corruption, and Death in Putin's Russia, by Politkovskaya, Anna, New York: Random House, pp. vii–xv, ISBN 9781400066827
