= A Russian Diary =

2007 book by Anna Politkovskaya

A Russian Diary: A Journalist's Final Account of Life, Corruption, and Death in Putin's Russia
- Author: Anna Politkovskaya
- Translator: Arch Tait
- Genre: Biography, Memoir
- Publisher: Random House
- Publication date: May 22, 2007
- ISBN: 978-1-400-06682-7

A Russian Diary: A Journalist's Final Account of Life, Corruption, and Death in Putin's Russia, is a book written by Anna Politkovskaya and published by Random House in May 2007 discussing Russia under Vladimir Putin, and was the last book of Politkovskaya's published before her assassination on October 7, 2006. Scott Simon wrote the foreword and Arch Tait translated the writing into English. Harvill Secker published the United Kingdom edition. In some versions Jon Snow, the main news anchor for the United Kingdom's Channel 4, wrote the foreword.

== History ==
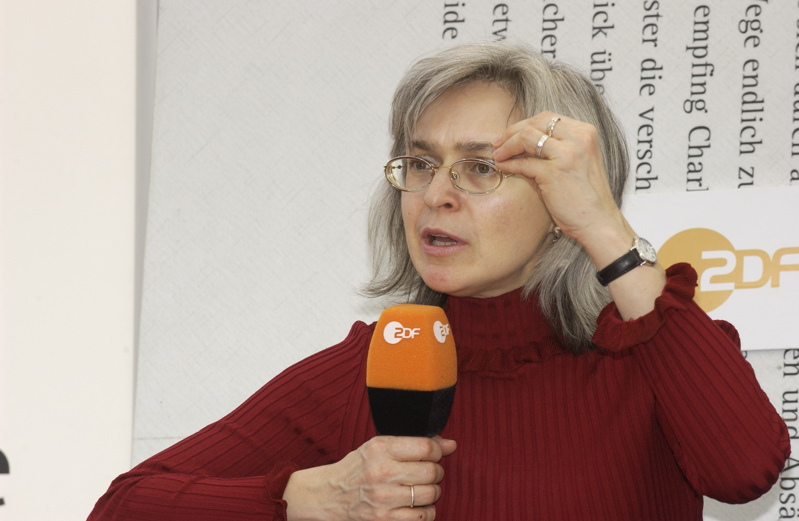
Anna Politkovskaya in 2005, one year before her murder.

Published after the author's death, it contains extracts from her notebook and other writings and gives her account of the period from December 2003 to August 2005, including what she described as "the death of Russian parliamentary democracy", the Beslan school hostage crisis, and the "winter and summer of discontent" from January to August 2005. Because she was murdered "while translation was being completed, final editing had to go ahead without her help", wrote Tait in a note to the book.

According to Viv Groskop of The Guardian, A Russian Diary has a stronger emphasis on politics compared to A Dirty War and Putin's Russia, and therefore is "less moving and immediate". It does not focus on Politkovskaya's personal life.

According to the book, Russia under Vladimir Putin reverted into an authoritarian society centered around the ruler.

== Content ==
The book has three parts. The initial section covers the 2003 Russian legislative election and the 2004 Russian presidential election which led to Putin's second term in office. The second section discusses the insurgency of the Second Chechen War, the Beslan school siege and its consequences, and other events in the second Putin term. She recalled a meeting with Ramzan Kadyrov, Head of the Chechen Republic. The last section describes the 2005 pensioner protests which, despite challenging the Kremlin, made no long-lasting difference.

Robert Legvold of Foreign Affairs wrote, "The tragedies generated by the Chechen war are what she knew best and wrote, knifelike, about".

== Reception ==
Bridget Kendall wrote that the translation was "admirably readable", and while it was prescient in degrees, predicting the sacking of Putin's prime minister and the Beslan school siege, also failed to talk about the Beslan siege itself as it was happening on September 1, 2004, and instead spoke of the "treacherous self-censorship" of Russian TV journalists. Kendall also found it strange that Politkovskaya did not discuss falling ill shortly before trying to fly to Beslan due to tea that she drank at the airport, a coincidence that led some to believe that she may have been poisoned, but was not remarked upon.

Andrew Meier wrote in The New York Times that Politkovskaya's "insightful black humor" was a positive, and helped to alleviate the intensity of the content depicted. Meier found it noteworthy that, despite Politkovskaya previously not shying away from speaking in the first person, she "receded" from her own memoir, and did not speak much of herself even in cases "when she had a starring role in the events she is describing". Meier also criticized elements of the translation and editing, citing references to unexplained Russian terms and use of specific British English terms over the course of the book, stating "If Putin was unkind to Politkovskaya, her translator and editor have done her few favors either.".

"Who killed Anna and who lay beyond her killer remains unknown", wrote Snow in his foreword to the book's UK edition. "Her murder robbed too many of us of absolutely vital sources of information and contact", he concluded, "Yet it may, ultimately, be seen to have at least helped prepare the way for the unmasking of the dark forces at the heart of Russia's current being. I must confess that I finished reading A Russian Diary feeling that it should be taken up and dropped from the air in vast quantities throughout the length and breadth of Mother Russia, for all her people to read."

Kirkus Reviews stated that the diary entries in the book "may lack total journalistic objectivity, but Politkovskaya more than justifies her bias with this emotional portrait of the dangerous lives of the Russian people."

The New Yorker noted that Politkovskaya’s assassination and her unflinching reportage “highlighted a growing trend of violence and corruption under the leadership of Vladimir Putin,” placing A Russian Diary within a larger narrative of press repression.

Words Without Borders highlighted the extraordinary stakes of Politkovskaya’s work, stating it “reveals the incredible risks and the dangers she faced as a journalist reporting on the limitations of Russian democracy,” underlining her role as a fearless witness.

Publishers Weekly stated that it was "A rare and intelligent memoir-if an entirely depressing one".

== See also ==
- Bibliography of Vladimir Putin
- Bibliography of Russian history (1991–present)

== Notes ==
- Some material originated from Anna Politkovskaya
