= Aleksandr Sokolov =

Aleksandr or Alexander Sokolov may refer to:

- Aleksandr Sokolov (footballer), Russian football striker
- Aleksandr Sokolov (painter, born 1829) (1829–1913), Russian portrait painter
- Aleksandr Sokolov (painter, born 1918) (1918–1973), Russian painter
- Aleksandr Sokolov (politician, born 1949) (Aleksandr Sergeyevich Sokolov), Russian Minister of Culture 2004–2008
- Aleksandr Sokolov (politician, born 1970) (Aleksandr Valentinovich Sokolov), Russian governor of Kirov Oblast since 2022
- Alexander Sokolov (sculptor) (1955–2022), Russian-born sculptor, resident in Spain
- Aleksandr Sokolov (sprinter) (born 1971), Soviet-Russian track and field sprinter
- Aleksandr Sokolov (sport shooter, born 1952), Soviet sports shooter
- Aleksandr Sokolov (sport shooter, born 1985), Russian sports shooter
- Aleksandr Sokolov (volleyball) (born 1982), Russian volleyball player
- Sasha Sokolov (born 1943), Canadian writer

== See also ==
- Alexandra Sokoloff, American novelist and screenwriter
