= Dmitri Sokolov =

Dmitri Sokolov may refer to:

- Dmitri Sokolov (footballer) (born 1988), Russian footballer with FC Torpedo Moscow and FC Amkar Perm
- Dmitri Sokolov (basketball) (born 1985), Russian basketball player currently with UNICS Kazan
- Dmitri Sokolov (biathlete) (1924–2009), Soviet biathlete
- Dmitri Sokolov (cyclist) (born 1988), Russian racing cyclist
- Dmitri Ivanovich Sokolov (1788–1852), Russian geologist

== See also ==
- Sokolov (surname)
