= Anna Stavitskaya =

Russian lawyer

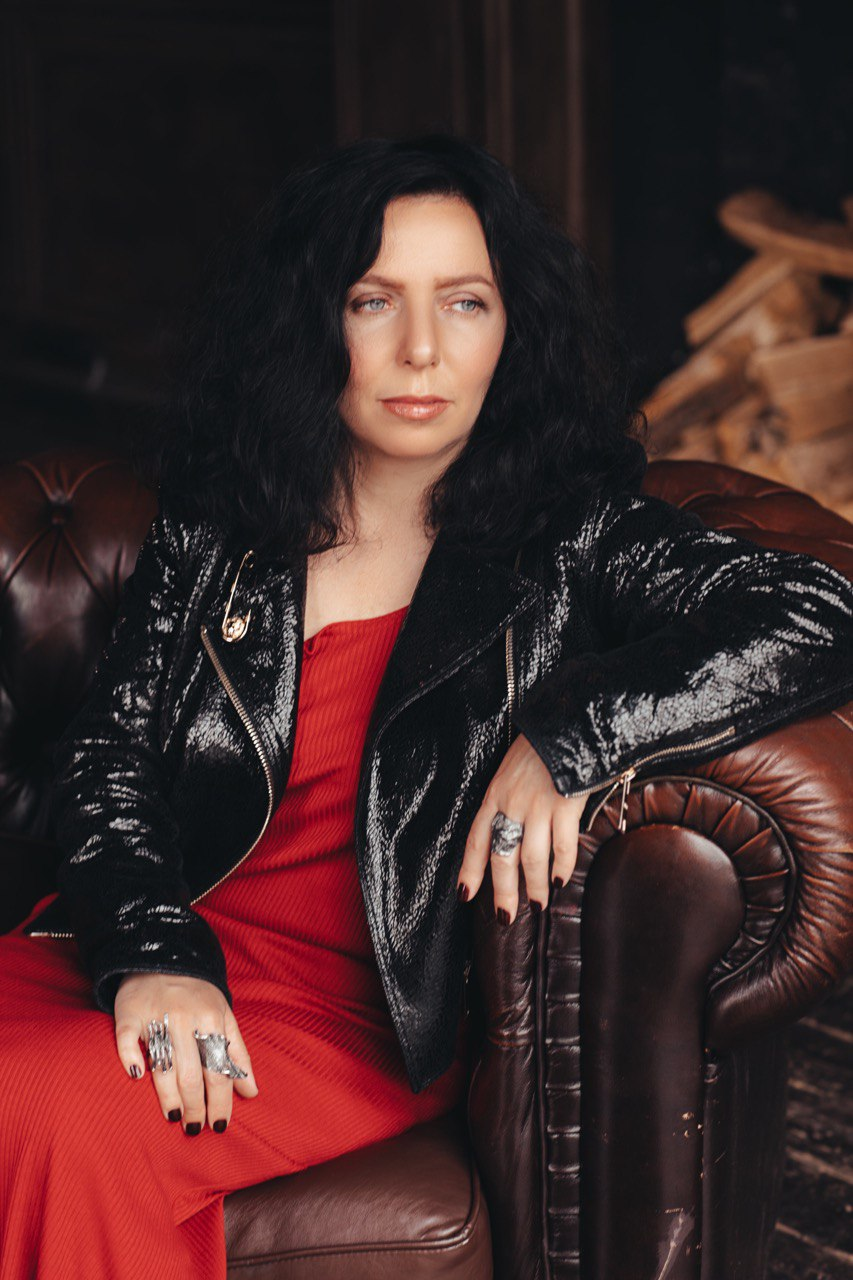
- Анна Эдвардовна Ставицкая
- Born: June 26, 1972 (age 53); Moscow, USSR
- Occupation: Advocate
- Known for: Extradition cases and representing in the European Court of Human Rights

Anna Edvardovna Stavitskaya (Russian: Анна Эдвардовна Ставицкая) (born June 26, 1972) is a Russian lawyer (advocate) specializing in extradition cases, jury trials, and representation before the European Court of Human Rights. She has participated in a number of high-profile trials, including murder of Anna Politkovskaya, scientists accused of espionage (Igor Sutyagin etc.), and the Katyn massacre.

== Biography ==
Anna Stavitskaya was born in Moscow. She graduated from the Kutafin Moscow State Law University in 1996. She has been a lawyer since May 27, 1997. Stavitskaya has an advocate's status (her number in the register of Russian advocates is 77/311) and is the member of the advocate's chamber (bar association) of the Moscow city, she carries out her professional activity as a member of the Kollegium of advocates "Liptser, Stavitskaya and partners".

In 1997, she completed a traineeship at the Danish Institute for Human Rights. In her advocacy, Stavitskaya uses international mechanisms for the protection of human rights.

In 2019, together with journalist and human rights activist Zoya Svetova, she co-hosted the podcast "Pravo Slovo" (“The Right Word”). In it, the two friends — a journalist and a lawyer — used examples of unjust verdicts to highlight problems of the Russian justice system and discussed them in conversations with well-known judges, writers, and artists, seeking to understand how the Russian law enforcement system could be reformed.

== Awards ==
- 2011: Human Rights Award from Moscow Helsinki Group.
- Since 2011 she has been named one of the 100 most influential women in Russia by Echo of Moscow, Ria Novosti and the magazine Ogoniok.
- 2019: became the leader of the rating of the 33 most open and authoritative representatives of the legal profession for the media, compiled by the Institute for the Development of Legal Culture and Communications.
