= Pavel Sokolov =

Pavel Sokolov may refer to:

- Pavel Sokolov (painter) (1826–1905), Russian painter
- Pavel Yevgenyevich Sokolov (born 1976), Russian footballer with FC Gazovik Orenburg
