= Viktor Sokolov =

Viktor or Victor Sokolov may refer to:

- Victor Sokolov (1947–2006), Soviet dissident
- Viktor Sokolov (naval officer) (born 1962), Russian naval officer
- Viktor Sokolov (cyclist) (born 1954), Soviet Olympic cyclist
- Victor Sokolov, alias of espionage agent Anatoly Gurevich
- Viktor Sokolov (footballer), Soviet player for FC Spartak Moscow in the 1930s and 1940s
- Viktor Sokolov (footballer born 1936), member of the Soviet Union Olympic football team
