= Avril Pyman =

British scholar and translator (born 1930)

Avril Pyman (aka Dr Avril Sokolov, FBA; born 4 May 1930) is a British scholar and translator of Russian poetry and children's literature. She was a reader in Russian at Durham University and its first female scholar elected as a Fellow of the British Academy. She also wrote a study of Russian symbolism and biographies of Alexander Blok and Pavel Florensky. She is the widow of Russian artist Kirill Sokolov, the father of her daughter Irina (Irene).

== Selected works ==
Selected translations include:

- Sarybelli, Osman and Ibrahimov, Mirza (editors). Azerbaijanian poetry : an anthology : classic, modern, traditional. Moscow : Progress Publishers. [662] p. Translated by Tom Botting, Gladys Evans, Olga Moisseyenko, Arthur Shkarovsky, Irina Zheleznova, Louis Zellikoff, Dorian Rottenberg, Eugene Felgenhauer, and Avril Pyman.
- Ognev, Vladimir and Rottenberg, Dorian (editors). Fifty Soviet poets. Moscow : Progress Publishers. 1st ed., 1969. 533 p. Translated by Dorian Rottenberg, Olga Shartse, Avril Pyman, Eugene Felgenhauer, Peter Tempest, Irina Zheleznova, Lois Zellikoff, Tom Botting, Gladys Evans, Jack Lindsay, and Archie Johnstone.
- Lazarev, L. (editor). Let the living remember : Soviet war poetry. Moscow : Progress Publishers. 1st ed., 1975. [400] p. Series title: Progress Soviet authors library. Translated by Alex Miller, Olga Shartse, Tom Botting, Walter May, Margaret Wettlin, Peter Tempest, Avril Pyman, Dorian Rottenberg, Gladys Evans, Irina Zheleznova, Louis Zellikoff, and Alex Miller.
- Samarin, Roman and Nikolyukin, Alexander (editors). Shakespeare in the Soviet Union : a collection of articles. Moscow : Progress Publishers. 1st ed., 1966. [275] + illustrations p. Translated by Avril Pyman.
- The Golden Fleece : tales from the Caucasus. Moscow : Progress Publishers. 1st ed., 1971. [263] p. Translated by Avril Pyman, which is translated to:
1. Persian by Gholagha Daneshian, 1989 and also by Ardeshir Nikpour, 2000
2. Azeri Turkish by Mohammad Hariri Akbari, 2005
3. Sorani Kurdish by Mhamad Hamasaleh Tofigh, 2000
- Molok, Yuri (editor). Vladimir Favorsky. Moscow : Progress Publishers. 1st ed., 1967. 322 p. Translated by Avril Pyman.
- Barto, Agnia. Mashenka. Moscow : Progress Publishers. 1976. 14 p. Translated by Avril Pyman.
- Barto, Agnia. Merry Rhymes. Moscow : Progress Publishers. 2nd ed., 1980. [80] p. Translated by Dorian Rottenberg, Avril Pyman, Eugene Felgenhauer, Irina Zheleznova, and Lois Zelikoff.
- Gorky, Maxim. Selected stories. Moscow : Progress Publishers. 1978. [517] p. Series title: Collected works in ten volumes : volume I. Translated by Margaret Wettlin, Avril Pyman, Bernard Isaacs, and Robert Daglish.
- Kubilinskas, Kostas. The frog queen. Moscow : Progress Publishers. 1st ed., 1974. [83] p. Translated by Avril Pyman.
- Pushkin, Alexander. Selected works in two volumes : volume one : poetry. Moscow : Progress Publishers. 1974. 208 p. Series title: Progress Russian classics series. Translated by Olga Shartze, Irina Zheleznova, and Avril Pyman.
