= Natalya Sokolova =

Natalya Sokolova may refer to:

- Natalya Sokolova (sprinter) (born 1949), Soviet athlete
- Natalya Sokolova (biathlete) (born 1973), Belarus biathlete
- Natalia Sokolova (model) (born 1976), Russian model and actress
- Natalya Sokolova, a Kazakh labor lawyer imprisoned in 2011
- Natalya Semper (1911–1995), Soviet memoirist and Egyptologist, whose actual surname was Sokolova
