= Kirill Sokolov =

Russian artist (1930–2004)

Kirill Konstantinovich Sokolov (Кирилл Константинович Соколов, 27 September 1930 – 22 May 2004) was a Russian artist who worked in a range of media and form, from book illustration and silk-screen printing to oil painting, collage and sculpture.

Between 1950 and 1957 Sokolov studied at the Surikov Institute in Moscow. Amongst his classmates was the future conceptual artist Ilya Kabakov. In 1960 he met his future wife, Avril Pyman, a British research student and biographer of Alexander Blok. The couple married in Moscow in 1963. For the next ten years he gained distinction as a highly original engraver and illustrator of some fifty books, including the works of Mikhail Bulgakov and Yuri Trifonov.

In 1974 Sokolov moved to the United Kingdom from where he established an international reputation. Living first in Berwick-upon-Tweed and then Durham, he coedited the international art journal Leonardo and became a member of the Society of Graphic Fine Art.

During his career, Sokolov developed his own method of printmaking, which he called "silkscreen collage". Using this technique he created dozens of folios on themes such as "London 1984" (just as much a tribute to Dore's "London a Pilgrimage" as to a reflection on British society after Orwell), "Big Meeting" (a reflection on the Durham Miners' Gala), "Chester-le-Street Parish Church" (a series celebrating the 1100th anniversary of the Parish Church of St. Mary & St. Cuthbert) and many others.
