= Aleksandr Sokolov (sport shooter, born 1952) =

Soviet sports shooter

Personal information
- Nationality: Soviet
- Born: 4 May 1952 (age 74) Moscow, Russia

Sport
- Sport: Sports shooting

Aleksandr Sokolov (born 4 May 1952) is a Soviet sports shooter. He competed in the mixed skeet event at the 1980 Summer Olympics.
