= Boris Sokolov =

Boris Sokolov may refer to:

- Boris Sergeyevich Sokolov (1914–2013), Russian geologist, paleontologist and academician
- Boris Vadimovich Sokolov (born 1957), historian and Russian literature researcher
- Boris Sokolov (1944–2022), Russian actor in The Hobbit (1985 film)
- Boris Sokoloff (1893–1979), Russian doctor, politician, cancer researcher and author.
