= Nikolay Sokolov =

Nikolay Sokolov or Sokoloff may refer to:

- Nikolay Sokolov (composer) (1859–1922), Russian composer
- Nikolai Sokoloff (1886–1965), Russian-American conductor and violinist
- Nikolai Sokolov (footballer, born 1897) (1897–1988), Soviet Russian football goalkeeper
- Nikolay Sokolov (runner) (1930–2009), Soviet Olympic athlete
- Nikolai Sokolov (footballer, born 1983), Russian football forward
- Nikolai Stepanovich Sokolov, fictional character from the Metal Gear series
