= Journalism Practice =

- Discipline: Journalism
- Language: English
- Edited by: Bonnie Brennen

Publication details
- History: 2007–present
- Publisher: Routledge
- Frequency: 10/year
- Impact factor: 1.678 (2017)

Standard abbreviations
- ISO 4: Journal. Pract.

Indexing
- ISSN: 1751-2786 (print); 1751-2794 (web)
- OCLC no.: 860436062

Links
- Journal homepage; Online access; Online archive

Journalism Practice is a peer-reviewed academic journal covering the professional practice and relevance of journalism. The founding editor-in-chief was Bob Franklin (Cardiff University). Franklin was succeeded by Bonnie Brennen (Marquette University). The journal was established in 2007 and is published by Routledge. According to the Journal Citation Reports, the journal has a 2017 impact factor of 1.678.
