= Olga Sokolova =

Olga Sokolova may refer to:

- Olga Sokolova (cyclist) (born 1969), Russian cyclist
- Olga Sokolova (athlete), USSR Hammer thrower
- Olga Sokolova (swimmer), represented Russia at the 2012 Summer Paralympics
- Olga Rakhmanova (1871-1943), Russian actress, married name Olga Sokolova
