= Yevgeny Gavrilovich Sokolov =

Yevgeny Gavrilovich Sokolov (Russian: Евгений Гаврилович Соколов) (Moscow 1880 — 1949) was an artist, who specialised in set design and postcards. He was one of the most active Muscovite postcard artists. He produced collections of postcards based on the themes of popular songs and Russian proverbs.

He was born in the night between 21 and 22 April 1880 to the bureaucrat Gavril Viktorovich Sokolov, descended from the petty nobility of the Novgorod Governorate, and his wife Olga Fyodorovna, in a little apartment at 2 Brest street in a three-story brick building belonging to the merchants Polyakov. His mother's sister, Evdokia Fyodorovna Simbirskaya, was married to Vasily Aleksandrovich Polyakov, one of the brothers who owned the great Znamenskaya Factory. His father died very young and his mother soon remarried, so the young Yevgeny was taken in by his uncle and aunt, who raised him and his cousin Sasha.

Vasily Aleksandrovich Polyakov was interested in agriculture, so he bought an active estate at Malakhovo in Tulskaya governorate and brought it into model order - Sokolov spent his childhood there. Polyakov sent his son Sasha to gymnasium, but Yevgeny was sent to Komissarov Technical School, where he was taught drawing and sketching by the German Gygo Makker.

However, Evgeny Sokolov did not wish to be an engineer and decided to become an artist. In 1898, Sokolov conceived and painted the set for the first performance in the Polyakov theatre The Old Man of Kashira, as well as sketches of the costumes; he personally produced the mockups. When at the Gybaylovo estate, a large manor house with outbuildings, which belonged to the Polyakov brothers, Sokolov regularly met their friends - people who were interested in art. Furthermore, Sokolov became a member of the artistic circle known as the Shmarovin Wednesdays, centred on the managing director of the Polyakov's finances, Vladimir Egovich Shmarovin, who collected pictures and Russian antiques. Every Wednesday Shmarovin gathered painted, writers, poets, artists and interested people at his attic house on Bolshay Molchanovka Street.

From 1903 to 1906 Sokolov studied painting at the academy of Franz Stuck in Moscow. A year after returning, on 11 October 1907, he married his cousin Tatyana Evert, the second ballerina of the Bolshoi theatre in the Znamenskaya Church in Dubrovitsy.

He began to work in a theatre called "Folk House" on Novoslodskaya Road in Moscow, which staged classic operas for the education of the masses. Gradually he became known in theatrical circles: he worked at the Korsha Theatre, the Moscow operetta and the Bolshoi theatre and designed more than 300 sets. For the hall of the Moscow Conservatory in the Bolshoi, Sokolov drew oval portraits of composers. He drew illustrations for the satirical magazines Bydilnik and Bolynka.

In 1910 Sokolov and his wife went to a tour of Eastern Europe, visiting Warsaw, Prague, Vienna, Budapest, through Trieste to Venice and visiting Milan, Florence and Rome. They stayed a week on the island of Capri, where they met Maxim Gorky and were guests of the artist Svedomsky at his villa, called Taormina, from Italy they went on to Greece and then to Turkey. In 1911 a daughter, Natalya was born to them, who became a noted translator, artist and memoirist.

In summer 1911, Sokolov worked in Odessa theatre.

Several series of postcards were created by him: Fabulous Themes (Universal Postal union of Russia), 7 Days of the Week (Universal Postal Union of Russia), Political Parties of Russia (Lithography by E. Kydinov and A. Levin).

== Bibliography ==
- Семпер Н. Е. Портреты и пейзажи // «Дружба Народов». — 1997. — № 2.
