= Lyubov Sokolova =

Lyubov Sokolova may refer to:

- Lyubov Sokolova (actress), Soviet actress
- Lyubov Sokolova (volleyball), Russian volleyball player
