= Yury Sokolov =

Yury Sokolov may refer to:

- Yury Sokolov (boxer) (1929–2016), Russian boxer
- Yury Sokolov (judoka) (1961–1990), Soviet judoka
