= Natalya Semper =

Russian Egyptologist

- Наталья Семпер
- Other name: Nelly Semper
- Occupations: translator, artist, memoirist
- Parent(s): Yevgeny Gavrilovich Sokolov; Tatyana Aleksandrovna Sokolova (née Evert)

Natalya Yevgenevna Semper (Russian: Натáлья Евгéньевна Сéмпер; 23 August 1911 – 29 October 1995) was a translator, Egyptologist, artist and memoirist.

== Biography and works ==
Descendant of an old Moscow family (related through her father to the brothers Polyakov, Promyshlenniki fur traders and patrons), she was the daughter of Yevgeny Sokolov, a Moscow artist and Tatyana Evert, a ballerina at the Bolshoi Theater. She was a precociously gifted child, mastering several European and Oriental languages, studied philosophy and Eastern cultures, wrote poetry and drew. Considering her name too ordinary, she invented the pseudonym Nelly Semper for herself at 15, which she later used as a professional pseudonym and which was also used by some works of a distinct English traveller. The pseudonym was an important part of her development and accompanied her for the rest of her life.

She wrote memoirs about her academic and dramatic life of Moscow in the 1920s and 30s. She studied for the Higher Degree in Modern Languages at the second Moscow State University (ВКНЯ; 1928–1930) and the Moscow State Linguistic University (МИНЯ) and was employed as a translator and reviewer for the All-Union Society for Cultural Relations with Foreign Countries (VOKS; 1935–1938), as well as for the author Sigizmund Krzhizhanovsky. She also wrote about her imprisonment in a single cell in the Lubyanka during the Great Patriotic War, forced labour on the construction of the Moscow Canal in the gulag. Written shortly before her death, these memoirs are unfinished (the narrative cuts off before 1959).

These memoirs are meant for possible readers of the 23rd century, interested in our time (if humankind still survives
and reads). I do not touch on world events or great people – historians will write plenty on them. <…>
I am only a "witness of change" at the intermediate level,
a photographer, so to say,
of literature, who decided to capture her immediate surroundings. <…> I pity all who are living, whose names will be lost forever, drowned without a trace in the current of history from Romulus to our days. Every individual – a facet, a mirror, reflecting real life.

Natalya Semper

She was arrested in July 1949, detained at Lubyanka and then at Butyrka prison. She took this event as a necessary break in a period of mental crisis ("I suppose the possibility of the existence of a rational, cosmic force, which determines the rhythm of life" ... "I was in need of fundamental change and it appeared in the form of the arrest").). She was convicted under article 58 for 10 years and was sent to Vyatlag (1950–1955).

Prison and the gulag not only did not break her, it made her more indomitable ("An entirely interesting life" ... "I love work, and the natural life in the camp was remarkable. And what a variety of people!"), as she became experienced in finding joy and unity with the world: "That shoot of wheat from the dead body of Osiris, suddenly germinated in me the will to live... I began to bring orger to internal chaos, to remove piles of collapsed debris and to clear a space for construction"; "One can infuse compassion in every step, share sympathetic joy with no one, but it is hardly ever done. Most people associate optimism with egoism, enjoying life with a healthy body, and reject this gift".

She was released in April 1955. For people, accustomed "to fight for survival in the wild and to their own company, reduced to nothing" ... "the transition to normal life was sometimes more difficult than staying in the Archipelago." Acquaintances expected to see an "emaciated 'goner' with a bruised soul, but a returned to their life like wine fermented, astoundingly joyful and happy.".

After she returned from the camp, she earned a living teaching English, German and French, producing summaries for the Institute of Academic Information on Oriental Studies at the Russian Academy of Sciences, doing writing work, etc. She wrote regular Egyptological literature reviews in the Journal of Ancient History. She "always preferred physical difficulties – the 'yoke' – and for that reason never served," and thought that she "lived the life of a happy person, full of youth's interesting events, catastrophes, gains, losses... lived just as she wished, despite material and day-to-day difficulties.".

The memoirs of Semper circulated in the samizdat; the autograph is stored in the Manuscripts department of the State Literature Museum.

== Critical response ==
The original publishers of the text believed the very highest talent of the author "was the talent of loving to live – to journey, new friends, bright colours and the covert, innermost things, which invisibly directs people's fates."

When reading N.E. Semper's memoirs, she leaves a marvellous feeling: it seems as if life passes before you, its principal milestones little different from the lives of many intellectuals, born at the beginning of the century – childhood with the obligatory Christmas tree, the revolution, difficult times, communal life, the new system, an attempt to find their niche amidst general "communisation," repression, references to intimates, her own arrest, the camp... – and along with this, some sort of fantastic spectacle; aspects of the novel show through in her use of "portraits" and "views", for which N.E. had a special gift – to see a story in every aspect of life, in every person she met – which was absolutely and uniquely hers

—

Noting the tendency in the twentieth century for the traditionally marginal genre of non-fiction to take the foremost place, the scholar N.P. Krochina notes that N.E. Semper-Sokolova's book "a representative example of the genre of memoirs in the twentieth century," considering her in the context of other examples of the genre, like the diaries of Mikhail Prishvin, The Gulag Archipelago of Aleksandr Solzhenitsyn, Ilya Ehrenburg's memoirs People, Years, Life, Sergei Durylin's notes In His Own Corner, Andrei Tarkovsky's Captured Time, etc.

There is no need to write a romance, "to invent images and situations... – even in an era not so action-packed." <...> The task of the author is to capture the unique, personal "I" in the current of history, in the whirlpool of life, and to give "a picture of ordinary life and not so ordinary people in this absurd century, combining an unprecedented expansion of consciousness – cosmic, academic, technological and personal – with the fall into the meaningless barbarism of two world wars and dozens of cruel and bloodthirst dictators." The author is moved by a Fyodorovian pity for the millions of unknown, irreplaceable "I"s, which the eddies and whirlpools of life carry "to Niagara's oblivion." The role of such memoirs is to retain particles of beings which have long left life.

—

In spite of the "rich factographic" autobiographical narrative, Krochina sees "a dominating thread of memory" in the "establishment of an independent personality, radiating joy and will to live," who managed to absorb and within herself the present and historical world views of east and west.

The author of this live-giving account appears to be the clearest conveyer of cosmic consciousnessin all its various manifestations – There is also interest in higher metaphysics, universalism, experience of absolute reality and harmony with the world, a need for rejoicing and dissolving in the nature of life. The most important manifestation of the creative energy of the world becomes culture: familiarisation with world cultures and special interest in the East with its diffuse understanding of the individual and its universalism. We have already emphasised her "vitality of life;" she was a person with an exceptional internal destiny, open to freedom and joy, such that N.E. even called herself a happy person

—

== Bibliography ==
- Усина Э А. (2003). "Наталья Евгеньевна Соколова-Семпер – Natalya Evgenevna Sokolova-Semper". In В. Я. Гельман; О. П. Дюжева; Ю. А. Савельев; et al. (eds.). Памятники и люди (Records / Individuals). Moscow: Вост. лит. pp. 309–313. ISBN 5-02-018341-5.
