= Sergei Sokolov (footballer, born 1980) =

Russian footballer

Personal information
- Full name: Sergei Valeryevich Sokolov
- Date of birth: 23 September 1980 (age 46)
- Place of birth: Pskov, Russian SFSR
- Height: 1.80 m (5 ft 11 in)
- Position: Defender

Senior career*
Years	Team	Apps	(Gls)
1998–2001	FC Pskov	50	(3)
2002–2003	FC Shinnik Yaroslavl	2	(0)
2003	FC Fakel-Voronezh Voronezh	30	(2)
2004	FC Lisma-Mordovia Saransk	25	(0)
2006–2007	FK Rīga	18	(1)
2008–2012	FC Pskov-747 Pskov	97	(6)
- * Club domestic league appearances and goals

Sergei Valeryevich Sokolov (Russian: Серге́й Валерьевич Соколов; born 23 September 1980) is a former Russian professional footballer.

He made his debut in the Russian Premier League in 2002 for FC Shinnik Yaroslavl.
