= Larisa Sokolova =

Russian composer

A charcoal and oil sketch of Sokolova

Larisa Panfilovna Sokolova (Russian: Лариса Панфиловна Соколова; born 31 March 1955) is the wife of Aleksandr S. Sokolov, the former Minister of Culture and Mass Communication of Russia. She is a member of the Union of Russian Composers, and has a Ph.D. in Musicology. She is currently the Head Chair of Musicology and Composition in the Musical Pedagogical Institute.

== Early life ==
Sokolova was born in Belarus, on 31 March 1955, her family relocated to Saint Petersburg, where her father was stationed in the army. She studied piano and graduated from the Minsk Conservatory.

She has one child.
