= Dmitri Ivanovich Sokolov =

Russian geologist

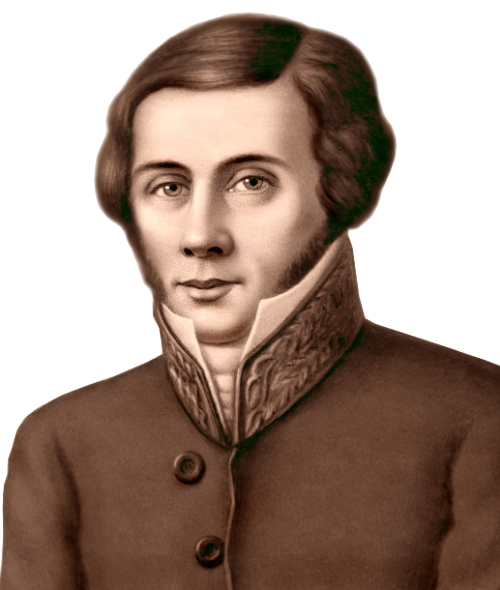

Dmitri Ivanovich Sokolov (Russian: Соколов Дмитрий Иванович 1788 – 19 November 1852) was a Russian geologist and specialist on mining who was a teacher at the St. Petersburg mining institute and a professor at St Petersburg University. He wrote some of the first Russian textbooks on mineralogy and geology, founded the first geology periodical in Russian and organized the geological museum of the university.

Sokolov was born in St. Petersburg where his father was a locksmith and inventor. After the death of his father, he went, as an eight year old, to the mining school in St. Petersburg. He graduated in 1805 and in 1809 he received a master's degree. He then taught mineralogy, geognosy and assaying. From 1822 he was also a professor at St Petersburg University. He founded the journal "Gorny zhurnal" (mining journal) in 1824 and served as its editor until his death. The journal with its first paper on "progress in geognosy" introduced Russian readers to geology works written in other languages. Sokolov studied geology from a chemical perspective and considered chemical composition as a key to underlying structure and properties. He reorganized the geological museum at the St. Petersburg University which had been established in 1819 and the minerals in the collections grew to 7900 in 1844, and were arranged following the system suggested by Berzelius. Sokolov's students included Nikolai Ivanovich Koksharov (1818–1892), considered the father of Russian mineralogy and crystallography.
