= Aleksandr Sokolov (politician, born 1949) =

Russian politician

- Александр Соколов
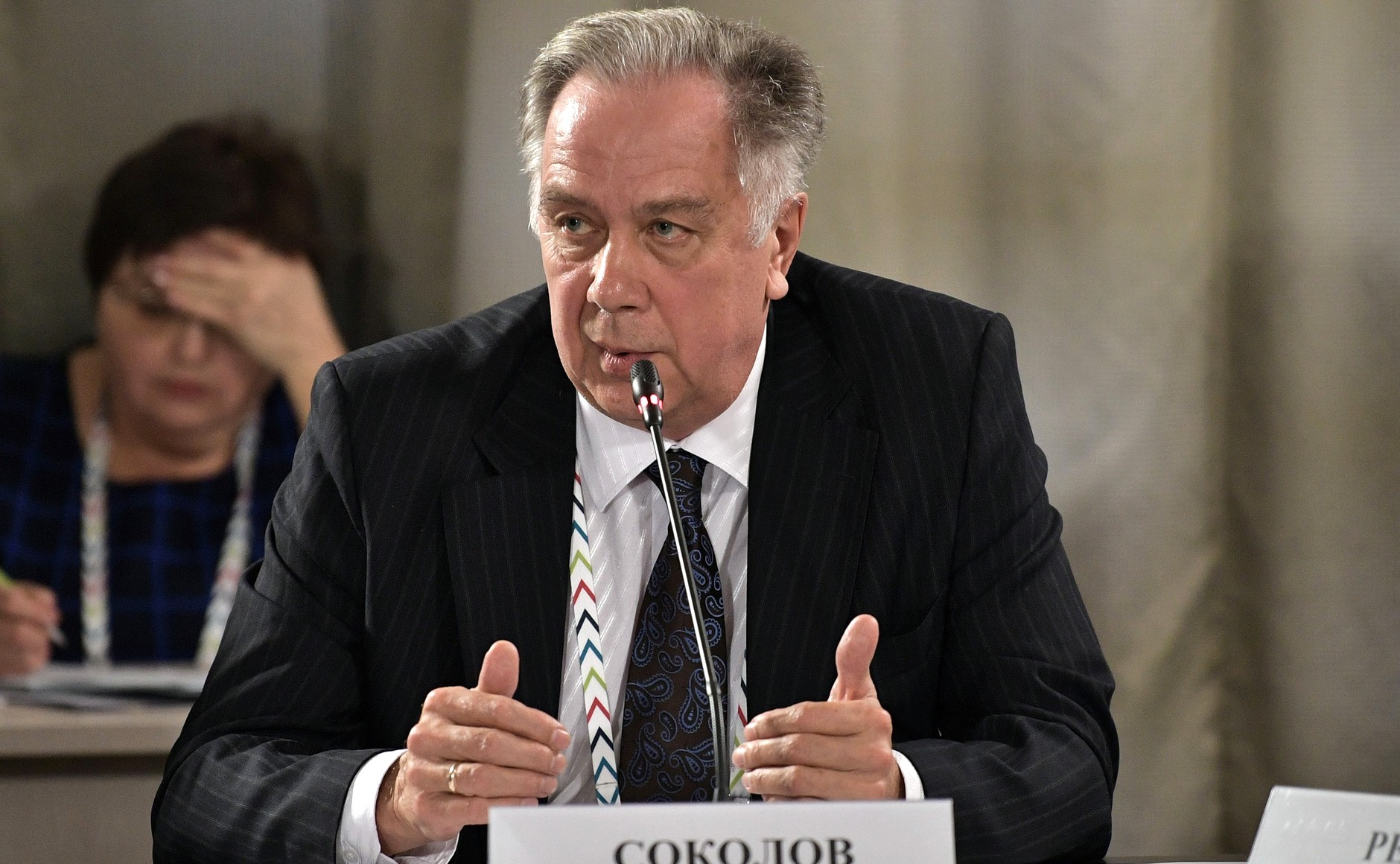
- Sokolov in 2017

Minister of Culture
- In office 9 March 2004 – 12 May 2008
- President: Vladimir Putin
- Prime Minister: Mikhail Fradkov; Viktor Zubkov
- Preceded by: Mikhail Shvydkoy
- Succeeded by: Aleksandr Avdeyev

Personal details
- Born: 8 August 1949 (age 77) Leningrad, Russian SFSR, Soviet Union
- Relatives: Ivan Sokolov-Mikitov
- Education: Moscow Conservatory
- Profession: Musicologist; composer
- Awards: State Prize of the Russian Federation, Order of Alexander Nevsky, Order of Honour, Order of the Star of Italy, Order of the Rising Sun

Aleksandr Sergeyevich Sokolov (Russian: Александр Сергеевич Соколов; born 8 August 1949) is a Russian politician and former Minister of Culture and Mass Communication for then-President Vladimir Putin's Mikhail Fradkov's First Cabinet. He was nominated to the post by the then-Prime Minister, Mikhail Fradkov, and held it from 9 March 2004 to 12 May 2008.

Sokolov was born on 8 August 1949 in Leningrad (now Saint Peterburg) and raised by his grandfather Ivan Sokolov-Mikitov. He completed his undergraduate degree at the Moscow Conservatory as a musicologist, and his attained his master's degree from the Conservatory's Department of Music Theory. He holds a Ph.D. in Musicology (1982) and the degree of Grand Doctor in Art (1992). He is also a member of Russian Composers Union and is a distinguished professor in many universities in Europe, Japan, and South Korea.

Since 1979, Sokolov has taught at the Moscow Conservatory, being appointed a full professor in 1993. He teaches music analysis and has chaired the Department of Music Theory since 1996. Between 1992 and 2001, he was the Conservatory's Vice-Rector in Scientific Affairs. From 2001 to 2004, Sokolov held the position of Rector of the Moscow Conservatory, leaving to take up his governmental position. In June 2009, he was re-elected as rector.

Sokolov has received many public and governmental honors, including the Honored Art Worker of Russian Federation (1999) and the Laureate of State Prize of the Russian Federation (2005).

He is an author of several musicological books and articles on music composition. Among them his monograph: "Introduction of the 20th Century Music Composition" (Moscow, 2004).

Sokolov is married to Larisa Sokolova and they have one daughter.
