= Vladimir Sokolov =

Vladimir Sokolov may refer to:

- Vladimir Sokolov (musician) (1936–1999), Russian clarinettist
- Vladimir Sokolov (rower) (born 1962), Russian Olympic rower
- Vladimir Sokolov (scientist) (1928–1998), Russian environmental scientist
- Vladimir Sokolov (speedway rider), Ukrainian/Soviet Union speedway rider
- Vladimir Samarin (1913–1992), the pseudonym of Russian Nazi collaborator and Yale University instructor Vladimir Sokolov

== See also ==
- Vladimir Sokoloff (1889–1962), actor
- Vladimir Sokoloff (pianist) (1913–1997), academic
