= Pavel Yevgenyevich Sokolov =

Russian footballer

Pavel Sokolov
Personal information
- Full name: Pavel Yevgenyevich Sokolov
- Date of birth: 10 May 1976 (age 50)
- Height: 1.77 m (5 ft 9 1/2 in)
- Positions: Defender; midfielder

Senior career*
| Years | Team | Apps | (Gls) |
| 1995 | FC Volga Ulyanovsk | 10 | (0) |
| 1996 | FC Energiya Ulyanovsk (D4) | | |
| 1997–1999 | FC Energiya Ulyanovsk | 100 | (5) |
| 2000–2001 | FC Lada-Energiya Dimitrovgrad | 58 | (5) |
| 2002–2004 | FC Volga Ulyanovsk | 97 | (2) |
| 2005–2006 | FC Gazovik Orenburg | 57 | (1) |
| 2007–2008 | FC Volga Ulyanovsk | 49 | (0) |
| 2009 | FC Gazovik Orenburg | 24 | (2) |
- * Club domestic league appearances and goals

Pavel Yevgenyevich Sokolov (Russian: Павел Евгеньевич Соколов; born 10 May 1976) is a former Russian professional football player.

== Club career ==
He played in the Russian Football National League for FC Volga Ulyanovsk in 2008.
