= Reactions to the assassination of Anna Politkovskaya =

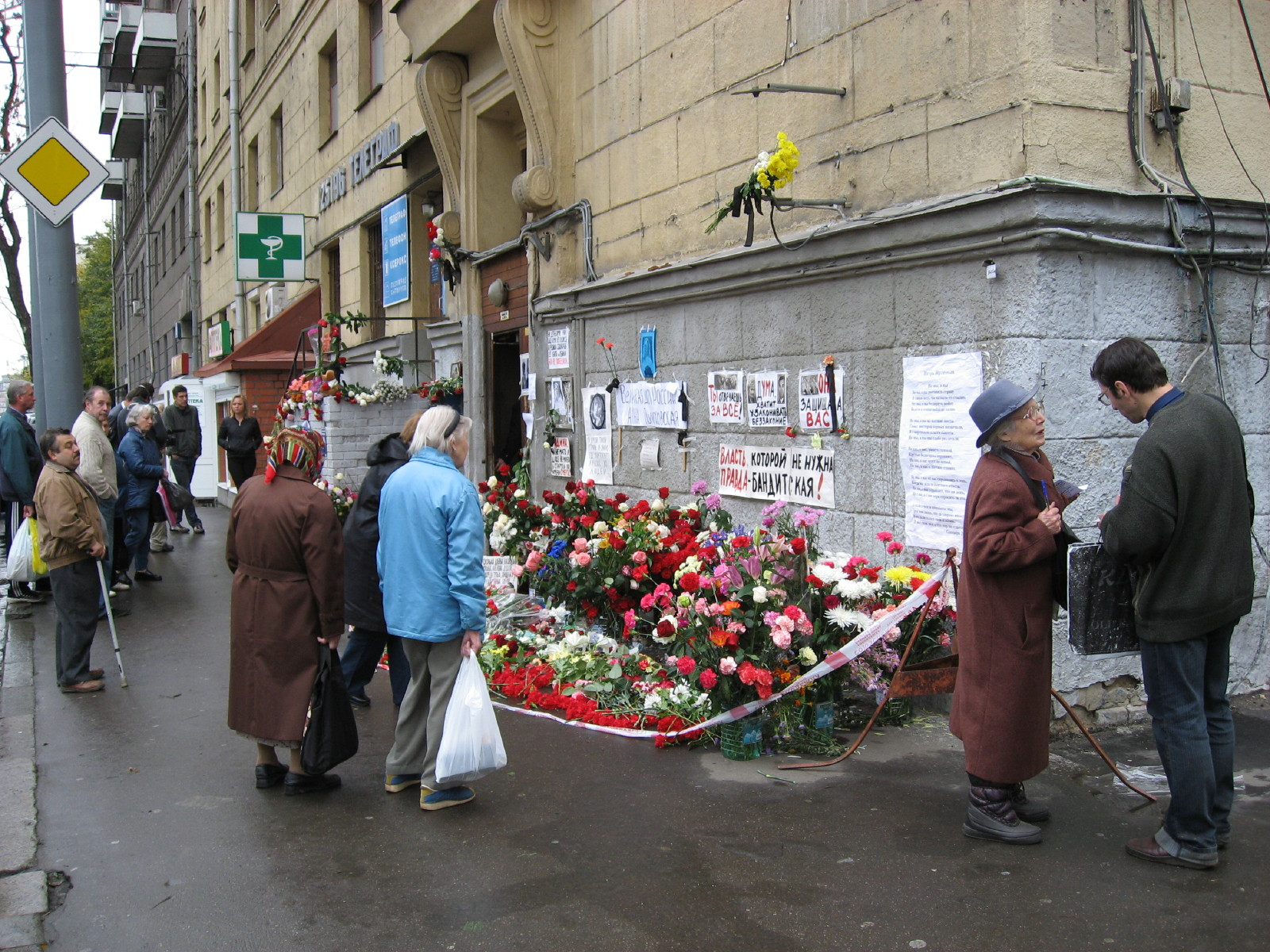
Spontaneous citizens' memorial at entrance to Anna Politkovskaya's Moscow apartment, 10 October 2006

In 2006, Russian journalist and author Anna Politkovskaya was assassinated in the elevator of her apartment block in central Moscow in what was reported as a contract killing. The murder of Politokovskaya, a known critic of Russian president Vladimir Putin and recipient of numerous international awards for her reporting on the Second Chechen War, sparked a strong international reaction.

== Reaction in Russia ==
Vitaly Yaroshevsky, deputy editor of Novaya Gazeta where she worked, said: "The first thing that comes to mind is that Anna was killed for her professional activities. We don't see any other motive for this terrible crime." He said Politkovskaya gave an interview to Radio Free Europe/Radio Liberty last week in which she said she was a witness in a criminal case against Ramzan Kadyrov in connection with abductions in Chechnya - a case based on her reporting. In that same interview, she called Kadyrov the "Stalin of our days".

Mikhail Gorbachev, the former Soviet President who promoted transparency and democracy and was concerned about the increasing lack of pluralism in the country, became a minority shareholder to support the newspaper Novaya Gazeta this summer. Gorbachev told the Russian news agency Interfax about this assassination: "It is a savage crime against a professional and serious journalist and a courageous woman", "It is a blow to the entire democratic, independent press. It is a grave crime against the country, against all of us." He also said the killing might have been intended to cast a pall over Putin's Kremlin.

On October 10, 2006, Russian President Vladimir Putin spoke out on the murder of Politkovskaya:

With regards to the murder of the journalist Anna Politkovskaia, then I have already said and I can say once again that this is a disgusting crime. To kill not only a journalist but also a woman and a mother. And the experts know well... that perhaps because Ms Politkovskaia held very radical views she did not have a serious influence on the political mood in our country. But she was very well known in journalistic circles and in human rights circles. And in my opinion murdering such a person certainly does much greater damage from the authorities’ point of view, authorities that she strongly criticized, than her publications ever did. Moreover, we have reliable, consistent information that many people who are hiding from Russian justice have been harbouring the idea that they will use somebody as a victim to create a wave of anti-Russian sentiment in the world. I do not know who has carried out this crime. But whoever they were and whatever their motives, they are criminals. They must be found, brought to justice and punished. The Russian authorities will do everything they can to ensure that this takes place.

== Statements by international organizations ==
Abi Wright, a spokeswoman for the Committee to Protect Journalists, said: "She was an intrepid and brave reporter who repeatedly risked her life to report the news from that region. It's a devastating development for journalism in Russia."

Aidan White of the International Federation of Journalists described her as bravest of the new breed of brave reporters who emerged in the dying days of the Soviet Union. "She faced down threats from all sides and was an inspiration to journalists both at home and abroad. Her death is a shocking outrage that will stun the world of journalism."

Amnesty International said that it was appalled by the murder. Nicola Duckworth, Director of the organization's Europe and Central Asia Programme, said "Russia has lost a brave and dedicated human rights defender, who spoke out fearlessly against violence and injustice, and campaigned tirelessly to see justice done."

Jiri Grusa, President of International PEN said that "Anna Politkovskaya (was) a courageous writer known for her criticism not only of the Chechen war but also of the totalitarian backlash characterizing the latest developments in Russia. Her death raises serious concerns and confirms all the fears," and "We protest in the strongest terms the situation in Russia that has allowed this to occur."

== Cultural references ==
Young Finnish musicians wrote a song in Politkovskaya's memory. The song is titled "Uuden ajan kynnyksellä — laulu Anna Politkovskajalle" ("On the Threshold of a New Era — A Song for Anna Politkovskaya") and it was recorded on 19 October in Helsinki. The song is released on the Internet on 20 October for free (although donations to Zhima Ditt are accepted) and an accompanying music video will be released on YouTube. If there's enough demand, a CD single will also be produced.

== Demonstrations ==
On 8 October 2006, hundreds rallied in downtown Moscow to protest the murder of Anna Politkovskaya and the recent crackdown on ethnic Georgians. The demonstration was described by the Moscow-based liberal Echo of Moscow radio station as "the largest protest rally of the opposition recently held in Russia." During the day following information about Politkovskaya's death, there was a demonstration and memorial consisting of 500 people in Moscow, and 300 people gathering in St. Petersburg. Further rallies and vigils took place in other Russian cities, including St. Petersburg, Yekaterinburg, Saratov and Krasnoyarsk, as well as London, Paris, New York, and Washington.

A day after the murder more than one thousand people (later estimation: over 3000) gathered at the Russian embassy in Helsinki, Finland to pay their respects to Politkovskaya (according to Helsingin Sanomat article published on October 22, there were about 3000 people). The demonstration was silent, with people holding candles. Two of Politkovskaya's books have been published in Finland as translated editions.

On 10 October, 2,000 demonstrators called Putin a "murderer" during his visit to Dresden, Germany.

About 400 demonstrators gathered in central Moscow's Pushkin Square on 7 April 2007, exactly six months after the journalist's murder, Echo of Moscow radio reported the same day. Yabloko party leader Grigory Yavlinsky told the gathering that the killings of Politkovskaya, journalist Dmitry Kholodov (in 1994), Russian Public TV head Vladislav Listyev (in 1995) and newspaper editor Larisa Yudina, who headed his party's Kalmykia branch (in 1998), like "many other well-known and obscure political murders," were "never investigated", newsru.com reported. And on April 5, Reporters sans Frontieres had said it was waiting with "the utmost impatience" for Prosecutor-General Yury Chaika to reveal the findings of his office's investigation of Politkovskaya's murder. "Statements praising his department's staff offer no guarantee that this horrible crime is being solved," the organization's press release added, referring to Chaika's March 29 comments hailing the work done by those in charge of the investigation.

"The passing months must not result in any weakening in the campaign on Politkovskaya's behalf. We must continue to press for justice to be done in this case and for an end to impunity in Russia." Reporters Without Borders added, "If the authorities fail to produce concrete and conclusive evidence, the creation of an international commission of enquiry or a Russian parliamentary commission of enquiry could prove necessary." Reporters Without Borders quoted Novaya Gazeta editor Sergei Sokolov as saying, "For the time being, we have no criticism to make about the work of the prosecutor's office." Sokolov had refused to divulge any details about the case because, he said, "a leak could have a disastrous effect on the investigation", the press freedom organization added.

== Official statements by governments ==
Chechnya — President Alu Alkhanov, in his interview with Itar-Tass, expressed his revulsion over Politkovskaya's murder:

stating that those responsible should receive "the most severe punishment". He noted that while his views on what has occurred in Chechnya are very different from those of Politkovskaya, he shared her view on the destiny of the Chechen people. He also expressed his condolences to her colleagues.

Chechen Premier Minister Ramzan Kadyrov denied rumors on the so-called "Chechen trace" in case of the murder of Politkovskaya.

"To speculate on this bloody crime without any reasons and serious proofs means to argue at the level of rumors and gossips; it does not adorn either the press or politicians," Kadyrov stressed. Also, he said that to attempt the life of a journalist means to try to prevent freedom of speech. "Despite not always objective character of the journalist's materials about Chechnya, I regret very much the events happened in such way," the premier said.

European Union — The Finnish Ministry for Foreign Affairs gave the following statement, as Finland held the Presidency of the EU Council at that time:

"The Presidency of the European Union has learned with deep regret about the killing in Moscow of Anna Politkovskaya, well-known journalist and defender of freedom of expression in Russia. The Presidency calls for a thorough investigation of this heinous crime and the bringing of its perpetrators to justice." and "On behalf of the European Union, the Presidency expresses its deepest sympathy to the family and friends of Anna Politkovskaya."

Finland — Finnish President Tarja Halonen said she was shocked and horrified at the killing and expressed the hope that Russia would soon find ways of preventing any repetition of such crimes:

"I very much hope that two things can be achieved in Russia through different means. One is respect for different opinions and the other is a strengthening of the rule of law, so that people can have a sense of safety." [...] "Taking a human life, hurting someone, is always a shocking matter. And when this apparently also involves the violation of freedom of expression it makes the crime that much more appalling."

The Finnish Minister for Foreign Affairs, Erkki Tuomioja, stated:

"I'm deeply shocked about this [murder], I knew her and I was familiar with her work. I knew she was extremely brave, because for her revelations, outspokenness and honesty she has gained many enemies. This kind of murder will put the credibility of the Russian administration into question. We will now see to what degree the Russian authorities are able and willing to solve the murder and bring to account the offenders, wherever the evidence may lead."

France — French President Jacques Chirac on Tuesday sent a letter to Politkovskaya's two children:

"The hateful murder of your mother" ... "has shocked me just as it has shocked all the French and all those who defend press freedom", Chirac said. "You should understand how important it is to France that everything be done to ensure justice is done and that the murderers of your mother be found and punished."

Georgia — President of Georgia Mikheil Saakashvili commented, on October 8, 2006, on Politkovskaya's death, stating that

"[she] was one of the biggest friends of Georgia to which she dedicated s series of very good articles in the last years." The members of the Parliament of Georgia, who knew Politkovskaya personally, described Politkovskaya as "a conscience of Russian journalism" and blamed "a general human rights situation in Russia" for the tragedy.

Germany — At a joint press conference with Russian President Putin, Chancellor Angela Merkel expressed her shock at the murder of Politkovskaya.

"The Russian president has promised me that everything possible will be done to solve that murder," she added.

Russia — In a statement in Dresden, Germany that came three days after the murder, President Vladimir Putin promised a "thorough investigation." Furthermore:

"Whoever has committed this crime," Putin said, "and whatever their guiding motives, we should state that this is a horribly cruel crime. It must not remain unpunished, of course."

According to Putin, Politkovskaya's influence on Russian political life was "very minor". Politkovskaya was a critic of the authorities, Putin noted, and her influence should not be overestimated. "It was minimal," he concluded. "She was known among journalists and in human rights circles and in the West, but I repeat that she had no influence on political life. Her murder causes much more harm than her publications did. Whoever did it will be punished." Two hours later, at the session of the St. Petersburg Dialog, the subject arose again. "Those people who are hiding from Russian justice are willing to sacrifice anyone to create a wave of anti-Russian feeling," Putin said.

Sweden — The Swedish Minister for Foreign Affairs, Carl Bildt, stated:

"I have been deeply saddened and distressed to hear of the killing of Anna Politkovskaya. Her struggle for human rights and freedoms was an important contribution to the work of making a better Russia and a better Europe. I sincerely hope that the Russian authorities will do their utmost to apprehend those responsible and clarify what lies behind this deed."

Ukraine — Ukrainian President Viktor Yuschenko stated in a press release:

"In Ukraine, we will always remember Anna Politkovskaya as an honest and courageous journalist committed to the ideas of justice and the protection of human rights."

United Kingdom — In a joint statement with President of the United States George W. Bush, Prime Minister Tony Blair said:

"We condemn this murder and call for a thorough investigation into this terrible crime." President Bush too urged Moscow "to conduct a vigorous and thorough investigation".

United States — President George W. Bush condemned the murder of Politkovskaya:

"'Born in the United States to Soviet diplomats, Anna Politkovskaya cared deeply about her country," President Bush said in a written statement. "Through her efforts to shine a light on human rights abuses and corruption, especially in Chechnya, she challenged her fellow Russians — and, indeed, all of us — to summon the courage and will, as individuals and societies, to struggle against evil and rectify injustices."

In Washington, the State Department spokesman, Sean McCormack, said the United States...

"...is shocked and profoundly saddened by the brutal murder of independent Russian journalist Anna Politkovskaya" and that it "urges the Russian government to conduct an immediate and thorough investigation in order to find, prosecute and bring to justice all those responsible for this heinous murder."
