= Vasily Sokolov =

Vasily Sokolov may refer to:

- Vasily Pavlovich Sokolov (1902–1958), Russian and Soviet major general
- Vasily Sokolov (footballer) (1912–1981), Russian football defender and coach
