= Sergei Sokolov (footballer, born 1986) =

Russian footballer

Personal information
- Full name: Sergei Sergeyevich Sokolov
- Date of birth: 11 November 1986 (age 39)
- Place of birth: Volzhsky, Volgograd Oblast, Russian SFSR
- Height: 1.85 m (6 ft 1 in)
- Position: Defender

Senior career*
Years	Team	Apps	(Gls)
2004	FC Torpedo Volzhsky	0	(0)
2005	FC Torpedo-2 Volzhsky		
2007–2008	FC Energiya Volzhsky	39	(1)
2008–2009	FC Krasnodar	42	(1)
2009	FC Gazovik Orenburg	9	(2)
2010	FC Energiya Volzhsky	14	(1)
2011–2012	FC Sokol Saratov	19	(0)
2012–2013	FC Olimpia Volgograd	26	(1)
2013–2017	FC Smena Komsomolsk-na-Amure	75	(8)
2017–2018	FC Rotor-2 Volgograd	21	(0)
- * Club domestic league appearances and goals

Sergei Sergeyevich Sokolov (Russian: Серге́й Серге́евич Соколов; born 11 November 1986) is a Russian former professional football player.

== Club career ==
He played in the Russian Football National League for FC Krasnodar in 2009.
