= Sergei Sokolov (journalist) =

Russian journalist (born 1968)

Sergey Sokolov
- Сергей Соколов
- Born: 1968 (age 57–58); Moscow, RSFSR, USSR
- Citizenship: Soviet Union → Russia
- Occupations: Journalist, correspondent, former editor-in-chief of Novaya Gazeta
- Years active: 1997–2026

Sergey Mikhailovich Sokolov (Russian: Сергей Михайлович Соколов, born 1968) is a Russian journalist who was the editor-in-chief of Novaya Gazeta from 1997 to 2026.

== Career ==
From 1990 to 1992 Sokolov has worked as a correspondent for the newspapers Komsomolskaya Pravda. At the end of 1992 he founded with a group of journalists Novaya Ezhednevnaya Gazeta and since 1995 he had been deputy editor-in-chief.

Beginning in 1997, he has worked for the weekly Novaya Gazeta, since 1998 as a special correspondent, since 1999, deputy editor-in-chief. In November 2023 he was elected as chief editor following Dmitry Muratov, who in September 2023 was put by interior ministry on the "list of foreign agents".

In October 2026, police searched Solokov's home and detained him for questioning regarding the jailed investigative journalist Oleg Roldugin.
