= Victor Sokolov =

Deceased journalist

Victor Sokolov (Russian: Виктор Владимирович Соколов) (February 21, 1947 – March 12, 2006) was a Russian-American former dissident Soviet journalist and an Eastern Orthodox priest.

He wrote articles critical of the Soviet government that were clandestinely distributed throughout the Soviet Union and abroad.

After moving to the United States in 1975, he was stripped of his Soviet citizenship by an ukase of the Presidium of the Supreme Soviet on September 7, 1976, for "activities discrediting the rank of a Soviet citizen", becoming only the fifth person around that time to be so penalized, among them Aleksandr Solzhenitsyn. He was ordained to the priesthood in 1984.

== Biography ==
=== Early life and dissident activity ===
Born in Tver (at the time named Kalinin), Sokolov served his obligatory stint in the Soviet Army before graduating from the Moscow Literary Institute and working as prose writer and editor for a monthly literary magazine. He became involved as a dissident in 1968 when he copied out his first samizdat, an appeal from five Soviet intellectuals objecting to the invasion of Czechoslovakia.

In the early 1970s, as a writer then unknown to the KGB, he was able to covertly report on the trial taking place in Leningrad of a dissident writer, which was distributed via samizdat and eventually broadcast via Radio Liberty and Voice of America.

As he became more active in the human rights movement, joining the Moscow branch of Amnesty International, he came to the notice of the authorities who kept a close eye on his activities.

=== Marriage and emigration ===
Sokolov was baptized into the Russian Orthodox Church in 1975, for the most part as a political statement. He married U.S. citizen Barbara Wrahtz, then employed by the U.S. Embassy, in a church service that same year, but her visa expired in August.

She was forced to return without him to the United States, but he received permission from the Soviet government to join her in November.

In the United States, Sokolov accepted a post as an instructor in advanced Russian at the University of California, Santa Cruz, where he continued to write for international anti-Soviet journals.

In November 1976 he wrote to the Soviet consulate to begin the process of obtaining permission for his parents to visit. Instead of a reply to his application, he received a letter informing him of an action taken by the Supreme Soviet two months earlier to strip him of his citizenship.

At the time he remarked that this action was "rash" since it placed him on the same level as "...Solzhenitsyn, Vladimir Maximov, Valery Chalidze and Zhores Medvedev", but that he would strive to merit this "high honor".

=== Church life ===
Over time, his church membership became more a matter of faith than politics. Sokolov was ordained to the priesthood in 1984, and in 1985 graduated from Saint Vladimir's Orthodox Theological Seminary with a Master of Divinity degree.

He served for a time in Canada at Holy Resurrection Church, Vancouver, British Columbia, where he also occupied a post as Lecturer in Slavonic Studies at the University of British Columbia, and then as rector at the Orthodox SS Peter and Paul Church in Buffalo, New York starting in 1990.

In 1991 he was assigned as rector of Holy Trinity Cathedral in San Francisco, California, the oldest Orthodox Christian parish in the continental United States, where he was "well-received" by the congregation. He served with distinction, and in June 2000 was elevated to the rank of archpriest by Bishop Tikhon of San Francisco.

=== Death ===
Late in 2004, Father Victor was diagnosed with squamous cell carcinoma of the lungs, which had already metastasized. He succumbed to the disease on March 12, 2006, the Sunday of Orthodoxy, at age 59. His wife Barbara succumbed to a similar disease two years later at age 56. (10/12/2008)
