= Putin's Russia =

Book by Anna Politkovskaja

- Book cover
- Author: Anna Politkovskaya
- Original title: Путинская Россия
- Subject: Vladimir Putin, Putinism
- Publisher: Harvill Press
- Publication date: 2004
- Publication place: Russia
- Pages: 290
- ISBN: 978-1-84343-050-6
- OCLC: 56645857

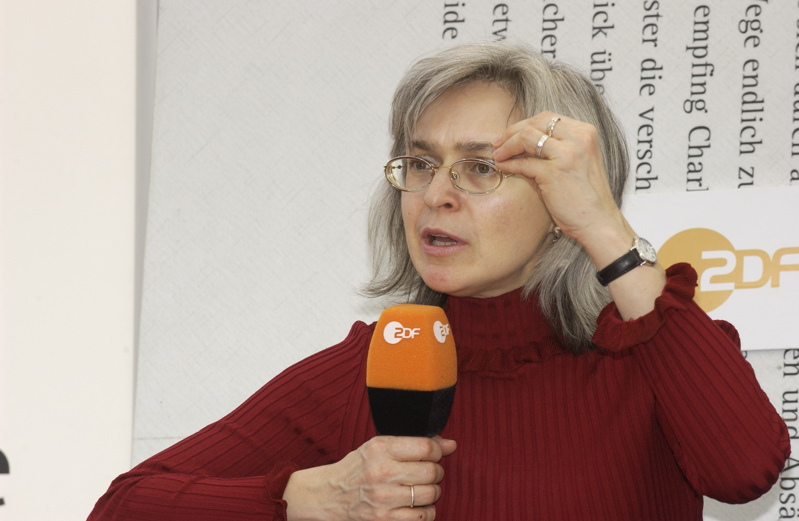
Anna Politkovskaja in 2005, one year before her murder.

Putin's Russia is a political commentary book by the Russian journalist Anna Politkovskaya about events and life in Russia under Vladimir Putin.

Politkovskaya argues that Russia still has aspects of a police state or mafia state, under the leadership of Vladimir Putin. In a review, Angus Macqueen wrote:

Perhaps the most disturbing aspect of this collection is that it feels like a Soviet-era dissident's book. Her pieces have that slightly desperate pitch of someone who fears no one is listening - that her own people have given up and that the outside world does not want to hear, or worse, does not care.

Politkovskaya described an army in which conscripts are tortured and hired out as slaves. She described judges who are removed from their positions or brutally assaulted on the street for not following instructions "from above" to let criminals go. She describes particular areas in Russia dominated and operating under insensitive companies or cold oligarchs that resemble brutal mafia bosses, with ex-military and special services personnel to aid them. She condemns routine kidnappings, murders, rape, and torture of people in Chechnya by Russian military, exemplified by Yuri Budanov. She mentions the decayed state and minimally financed conditions of the Russian Pacific Fleet and nuclear arsenal in Vladivostok. She describes the persistence of the infamous Moscow Serbsky Institute of psychiatry and Dr. Tamara Pechernikova, who was notorious for torturing Soviet dissidents in "psikhushkas" of the 1960s and 1970s, often using drugs such as haloperidol. She tells the story of Pavel Fedulev, a petty criminal who became "the leading industrialist and deputy of the legislature", as a prototype "New Russian".

Politkovskaya accuses Vladimir Putin and FSB of stifling all civil liberties and promoting corruption to further the establishment of an authoritarian regime, but tells that "it is we who are responsible for Putin's policies" in the conclusion:

Society has shown limitless apathy... As the Chekists have become entrenched in power, we have let them see our fear, and thereby have only intensified their urge to treat us like cattle. The KGB respects only the strong. The weak it devours. We of all people ought to know that.

== See also ==
- Putin. War
