= Elbaum =

Elbaum is a surname. Notable people with the surname include:

- Cynthia Elbaum (1966–1994), American photojournalist
- Dov Elbaum (born 1970), Israeli journalist, television host, and Jewish philosophy lecturer
- Max Elbaum, American historian, author, and social activist
- Sebastian Elbaum, American computer scientist
