= Vladimir Zhitarenko =

Russian military correspondent

Colonel Vladimir Zhitarenko (Russian: Владимир Житаренко; June 15, 1942 – January 1, 1995) was a military correspondent for the Russian armed forces daily Krasnaya Zvezda (Red Star).

Zhitarenko had covered post-Soviet conflicts in Afghanistan, Abkhazia, Chechnya, South Ossetia, Tajikistan and the Transdnester, as well as the nuclear disaster at Chernobyl.

On December 31, 1994, Zhitarenko was hit by two sniper bullets, including in the head, as he stepped out of an armored personnel carrier on a front line outside the town of Tolstoy-Yurt, near the Chechen capital of Grozny. He died the next day, as the second journalist to die covering the First Chechen War (after Cynthia Elbaum, an American photographer killed during an air raid on Grozny on December 22, 1994).
