= Business Solidarity (NGO) =

Business Solidarity (Russian: Бизнес Солидарность) is a Russian NGO, which has received international media coverage for its campaigns against the persecution of businesspeople in Russia, where many such cases have been reported (see Human rights in Russia). It was founded by the businesswoman Yana Yakovleva, who decided to take action after spending time in prison in pre-trial detention on trumped up charges. Yakovleva and Business Solidarity have played an active role in legislative changes in Russia. The organisation's website maintains a catalogue of cases of persecution.
