= Zarema Bagavutdinova =

Russian prisoner

- Born: Zarema Bagavutdinova; 1968 (age 57–58)
- Occupation: Human rights activists

Zarema Bagavutdinova (born 1968) was a member of a Dagestan regional human rights group, "Pravozashchita" or "Human Rights Defense." She was imprisoned in July 2013 on charges of recruiting on behalf of an armed Islamic insurgency in the region of Dagestan. She was sentenced to five years of incarceration.

Bagavutdinova has been named a political prisoner by several NGOs, citing contradictory facts presented as evidence and lack of material evidence. Human rights groups note that Bagavutdinova had made several critical remarks about Russian security services prior to her arrest.

== Activism ==
A map of Dagestan

The Northern Caucasus region of Dagestan contains dozens of ethnic groups and languages.^{[22]} It has been dogged by conflicts between the Islamic Sufis, who recognise the state, and Salafis, who reject secular rule.^{[22]} This conflict has led Dagestan to the highest levels of violence in the North Caucasus republics.^{[23][24]} The Russian Interior Ministry stated that of the 399 terrorist crimes in the North Caucasus in 2013, 242 were in Dagestan.^{[25]}

Bagavutdinova's work with Pravozashchita documented and publicized human rights concerns related to Salafi causes. The group had been placed under surveillance and some members of the group had been searched.

== Charges and imprisonment ==
Dagestani police forces charge Bagavutdinova "maintained close kinship and friendship relations with active members of the 'Buynaksk Jamaat', was actively engaged in propaganda of the 'Salafi' trend of Islam, known as 'Wahhabism', and involved in recruiting individuals to join [illegal armed forces]."

Several human rights groups have stated concerns with the way this trial was conducted. The court found its verdict on the testimony of five secret witnesses, two of which were prisoners found with weapons in their homes. One later recanted his testimony. They initially testified that Mamma Dalgatov, a Dagestani, met Bagavutdinova in the department store where she worked. According to the court, Bagavutdinova told Dalgatov to fight jihad against the government. The court claimed that Bagavutdinova cultivated a friendship and promised to marry Dalgatov if he joined the insurgency. Dalgatov was killed in an anti-terrorist action in 2013.

== International response ==
The Institute of Modern Russia and Memorial, a human rights group which Russia has called a "foreign agent," have called Bagavutdinova a political prisoner. The group Human Rights Watch has called Bagavutdinova's trial "politically motivated and unfair."

Human rights groups say that the secret witnesses gave contradictory descriptions of the person alleged to be Bagavutdinova. This included different heights and ages. One witness later recanted his testimony, stating he had made his statements under pressure. Witnesses report that Bagavutdinova had previously been harassed by local authorities for her work on human rights campaigns in the area. They also argue that holding the entire trial behind closed doors is a violation of her human rights.

Russian officials have stated that there is no state process for convicting a person for a political crime. The Moscow Helsinki Group, the oldest human rights organization in Russia, argue that while there are no laws against political crimes, there have been cases of politically motivated charges.
