= Sebastian Elbaum =

American computer scientist

Academic background
- Education: PhD, University of Idaho

Academic work
- Institutions: University of Virginia; University of Nebraska–Lincoln

Sebastian Elbaum is an Argentinian-American computer scientist. He is a professor at the University of Virginia. Dr. Elbaum was elected as a Fellow of the Institute of Electrical and Electronics Engineers in "recognition of his contributions of testing techniques for evolving systems. He was also named to the 2022 class of ACM Fellows, "for contributions to the analysis and testing of evolving systems and robotic systems"."

== Early life and education ==
Elbaum received his Ph.D. from the University of Idaho and a Systems Engineering degree from Catholic University of Córdoba.

== Career ==
Upon completing his education, Elbaum accepted a faculty position at the University of Nebraska–Lincoln where he co-founded two international recognized labs, the E2 Software Engineering Lab and the Nimbus Robotics Lab. He received a $36,500 Google Faculty Research Award and National Science Foundation Award for his project "Solving the Search for Code with Inputs and Outputs" for one year. The following year, he collaborated with Carrick Detweiler for their project "Co-Aerial Ecologist: Robotic Water Sampling and Sensing in the Wild" project as part of the National Robotics Initiative. In 2015, Elbaum was appointed to the rank of Willa Cather/Charles Bessey Professorship.

Elbaum eventually left the University of Nebraska–Lincoln in 2018 to accept a similar position at the University of Virginia. During the COVID-19 pandemic, Elbaum was elected a Fellow of the Institute of Electrical and Electronics Engineers in "recognition of his contributions of testing techniques for evolving systems." He was named to the 2022 class of ACM Fellows, "for contributions to the analysis and testing of evolving systems and robotic systems".
