= Imprisonment of Evgeny Afanasyev and Svyatoslav Bobyshev =

Evgeny Vasilyevich Afanasyev (1952-2014) and Svyatoslav Bobyshev (b.1953) were professors at the Baltic State Technical University. In 2012, after two years of detention, the two were convicted of treason tied to alleged sale of Russian missile information to a Chinese spy. Russian Federation Courts sentenced Afanasyev to 12 1/2 years in a prison camp, and Bobyshev to 12. Afanasyev died in prison. Russia's Memorial Human Rights Center identified the scientists as political prisoners, and determined that their detention was a violation of international human rights agreements.

== Detainment and trial ==
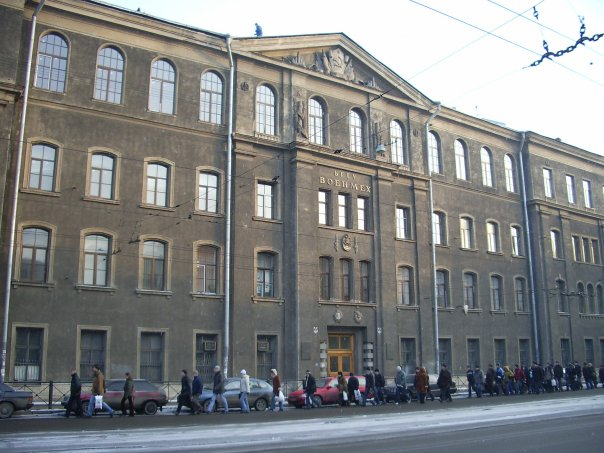
Baltic State Technical University in St. Petersburg, Russia.

The charge alleged that the pair sold classified information about technology that could detect Russia's Bulava-class submarine-launched missiles. The court alleged that the two had sold the information to a Chinese spy in 2009. The Russian charges were tied to an agreement between the professors' university, Baltic State Technical University in St. Petersburg, and Harbin Engineering University in China. The chairman of Afanasyev's department said the lectures did not include any specifications about the missiles.

Human rights groups argue that the scientists are political prisoners charged with a crime without evidence. Human rights groups also suggest that the detention for two years without trial, and eventual closed trial, were a violation of the Universal Declaration of Human Rights and the International Covenant on Civil and Political Rights.

After two years of detainment at Moscow’s Lefortovo maximum-security prison, the Russian state convicted the pair for "High Treason.".

== Designation as political prisoners ==
Russian officials have stated that there is no state process for convicting a person for a political crime. The Moscow Helsinki Group, the oldest human rights organization in Russia, argue that while there are no laws against political crimes, there have been cases of politically motivated charges. Advocates for the pair include the Committee of Concerned Scientists, the Memorial Human Rights Center, and Scholars at Risk.
