= Jochen Piest =

German journalist (1964–1995)

Jochen Piest (1964 in Bad Honnef – 1995 in Tscherwljonnaja) was a German correspondent for the German newsmagazine Stern.

== Life ==
On 10 January 1995, Piest was killed in a suicide attack by a Chechen rebel against a Russian mine-clearing unit in the village of Chervlyonna, about 24 kilometers northeast of the Chechen capital, Grozny. Piest was fatally hit by three bullets, while a Rossiskaya Gazeta correspondent Vladimir Sorokin was wounded in the attack. The gunman died when the locomotive collided with the military train.
