= Cynthia Elbaum =

American photojournalist (1966–1994)

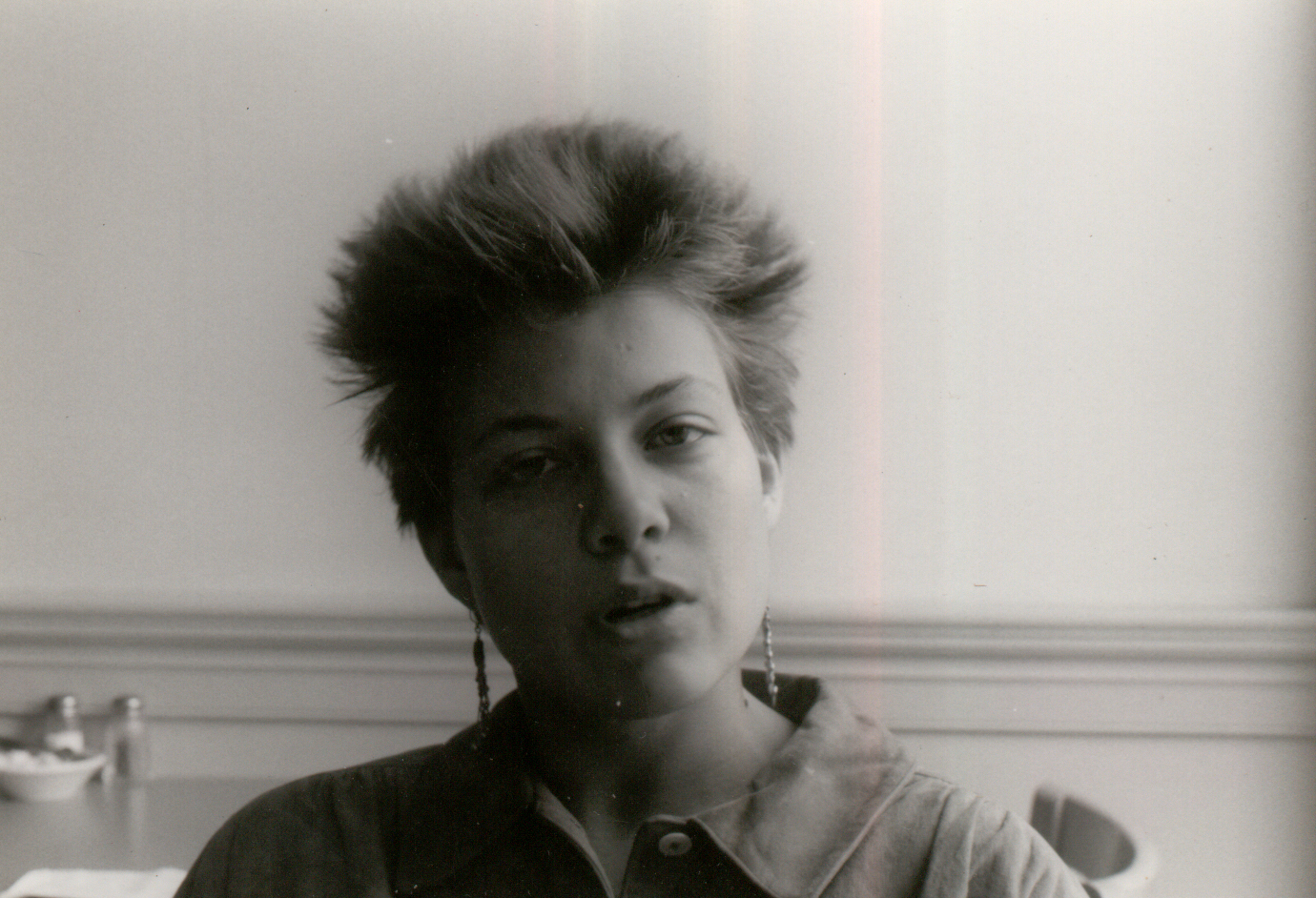
- Elbaum in 1988
- Born: March 19, 1966; Ashfield, Massachusetts, United States
- Died: December 22, 1994 (aged 28); Chechnya, Russia
- Known for: Photography

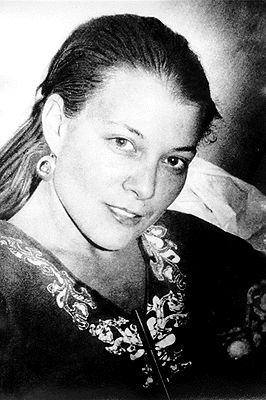
Cynthia Elbaum

Cynthia Elbaum (March 19, 1966 – December 22, 1994) was an American photojournalist, killed in Chechnya, where she was working as a freelancer for Time, the BBC, Moscow Times, reporting on the First Chechen War.

== Biography ==
Cynthia Elbaum, who was of Russian descent and grew up in Ashfield, Massachusetts, attended UMass Amherst from 1984 -1987 while taking classes at Smith and graduated from Smith College in 1989 with a major in Russian studies. She traveled frequently to the former Soviet Union, working as a freelance photojournalist. Elbaum studied Russian at the University of Moscow after graduating from Smith and also worked as a freelance photographer in Russia before returning to the States where she worked as a translator for a Time photographer and taught English to Russian refugees. Elbaum began her career as a photojournalist in 1992, after she witnessed dead bodies on a Moscow street following Boris Yeltsin's takeover of the Russian parliament.

On assignment for Time magazine during the start of the first war in Chechnya, Cynthia was photographing in the streets of Grozny, the capital of the breakaway republic, when she was killed in a Russian bombing raid. She is the first journalist known to have been killed in that war. At least 23 other civilians were killed in the shelling.

== Legacy ==
Elbaum's papers are held at Smith College.

Cynthia Elbaum name was written on the glass panels of the Freedom Forum Journalists Memorial at the Newseum in Washington, D.C.
