= Universal Electronic Test Chart =

TV test pattern for the SECAM colour standard developed in the Soviet Union.

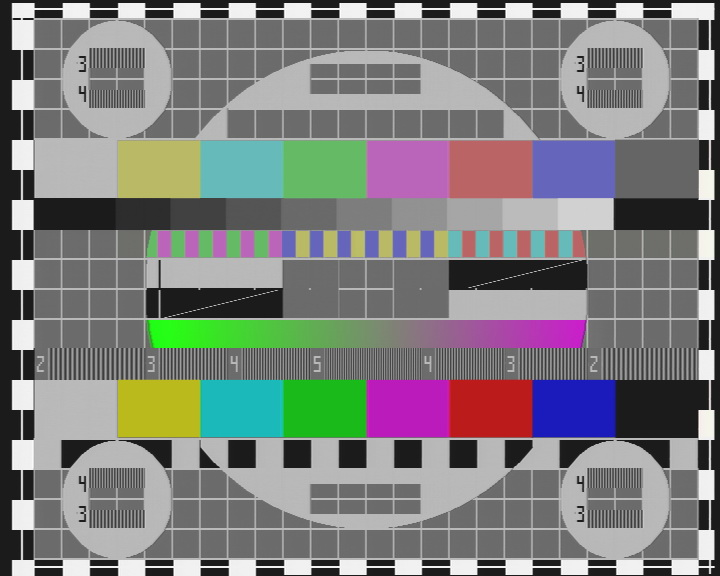
Off-air capture of a UEIT-2 test card

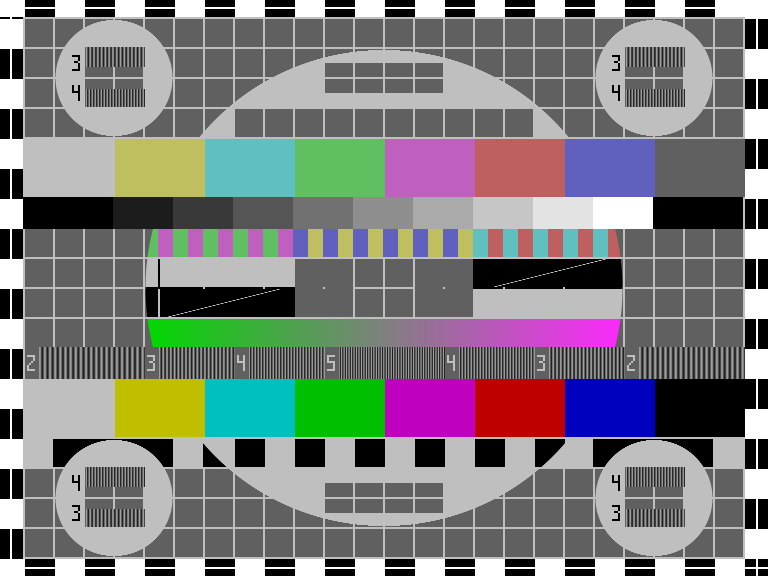
An UEIT-2 test card generated using the Matlab script.

Recreation of the UEIT-2 test card

ТИТ-0249, monochrome predecessor of the UEIT test card

UEIT - Universal Electronic Test Chart (russian: УЭИТ - Универсальная электронная испытательная таблица) is a Soviet/Russian test card, designed to test TVs operating in the analogue SECAM colour standard.

UEIT was developed by N. G. Deryugin and V. A. Minaev at the NII Radio Scientific Research Institute as the successor to the monochrome ТИТ-0249 test card with the informal name of "Colour Prevention Table" (TCP). This was the second attempt by the Soviets to create a colour test card, since previous efforts undertaken in 1954 (the ТИТ-0154 test card) in conjunction with the early prototype NIIR/SECAM IV colour television system, were abandoned in favour of regular SECAM III B. On the golden jubilee year of the October Revolution in 1967, colour broadcasts debuted in both Moscow and Leningrad (now Saint Petersburg).

Experimental broadcasts using the first three prototype versions of the UEIT (one of which was a modification of the Hungarian HTV TR.0782 test card; but all were collectively referred to as UEIT-1) began from the Ostankino Tower transmitter in 1970, with results being used to create the current version of the test pattern. This new version, called UEIT-2, was introduced in 1971 with several GOST-approved modifications up to 1986, and was used on terrestrial broadcast and on point-to-point links throughout the Soviet Union.

The prototypes and current version of the UEIT were used on Soviet television services: six national channels (First Programme, Second Programme, Moscow Programme, Fourth Programme, Fifth Programme and the Sixth Programme) and Third Programme/regional stations. It was also used in some Soviet Republics and allied countries like the Estonian SSR, Latvian SSR, Lithuanian SSR, Kirghiz SSR, Byelorussian SSR, Ukrainian SSR, Kazakh SSR, Tajik SSR and the Georgian SSR, as well as Cuba. It continued to be used on post-Soviet times in Russia and some former Soviet republics and allies.

The card was replaced by digital versions with the switch to digital broadcasting in Russia using the DVB-T2 standard by late-2019.

== Usage and features ==
The UEIT allowed to adjust image geometry and picture settings such as brightness, contrast and colour saturation. Other more technical adjustments were also possible, such as cathode-ray tube focus and raster distortions.

The card features the following elements:

- Grid box - makes up the background of the table. Allows adjustment of CRT convergence and easy reference for test card elements by "line" numbers (as indicated below);
- Small circles - at lines 3, 4, 17, 18, they have the same function as the Gratings;
- Center crosshair - in the center of the large circle, allows further convergence and image centering adjustments on CRTs;
- Table border - fiducial marks for setting proper image geometry and overscan;
- Circles - provide a way to correct vertical and horizontal raster scan distortions;
- Colour bars - two sets of bars (75% saturation at lines 6 to 7; 100% saturation at lines 14 to 15) to adjust colour saturation;
- Greyscale - a set of bars on line 8, that allow setting brightness, contrast, white balance and black level;
- Contrasting colour stripes - located at line 9, they allow checking of colour transitions;
- Slanted stripes- located at lines 10 to 11, they allow checking of interlace accuracy;
- Smooth colour transition - at line 12, it allows to check the color linearity over the full colour spectrum, or a green to magenta transition;
- Gratings - located at line 13, these help to assess resolution and image focus. They are formed by bursts of sinusoidal signals with frequencies of 2, 3, 4 and 5 MHz, corresponding to resolutions of 220, 330, 440 and 550 horizontal TV lines;
- Black and white squares- alternating squares at line 16, to evaluate the frequency response of the video chain;

== See also ==
- Philips PM5540
- Telefunken FuBK
- Soviet Central Television
