= Soviet Central Television =

State television broadcaster of the Soviet Union

- The final logo for Soviet Central Television, used from 1982 to 1991
- Type: Broadcast television (analog)
- Country: Soviet Union
- First air date: 1 October 1931; 95 years ago
- Availability: Free-to-air
- Founded: 1 May 1931; 95 years ago by Gosteleradio SSSR
- TV stations: Programme One (Note: Ostankino TV Channel 1, Public Russian Television and now Channel One Russia); Programme Two (Note: later Russian Television, RTR, Russia and now Russia-1); Moscow Programme (Note: later Moscow Television Channel and now TV Centre); Programme Four (Note: later Ostankino TV Channel 4, Russian Universities and now NTV (Note: NTV already existed as Russian Universities, an evening news, sports, music, movies, series and entertainment block until it took over Russian Universities entire airtime in 1994)); Leningrad Television (Note: Petersburg State Television Company to 1997, Saint Petersburg Television and Radio until 2004 and now Petersburg - Channel 5); Technical Programme (Note: later Technical Channel, TV-6 Moscow, TV-6, NTV-Plus Sport on channel 6, TVS, Sport, Russia-2 and now Match TV)
- Owner: Government of the Soviet Union
- Launch date: 22 March 1951; 75 years ago
- Dissolved: 27 December 1991; 34 years ago
- Former names: Moscow Radio Center (1 May 1931—December 1933); Moscow Department Television (11 February 1934—9 March 1939); Moscow Television Center (10 March 1939—December 1948); Moscow Department TV Broadcast (16 June 1949—21 March 1951); Central Studio Television (22 March 1951—15 May 1957)
- Picture format: SECAM (576i 4:3 SDTV)
- Language: Russian
- Replaced by: Television "Ostankino"

The Central Television of the USSR (Russian: Центральное телевидение СССР, romanized: Tsentral'noye televideniye SSSR; abbreviated CT USSR, SCTV [Russian: ЦТ СССР, romanized: TsT SSSR]) was the state television broadcaster of the Soviet Union.

Initially, the service was operated, together with the national radio service, by the Ministry of Culture. Later it was operated by the Gosteleradio committee, under the Communications Ministry and the Information and Press Ministry, and later a Council of Ministers-controlled network of television and radio broadcasting.

== First decades ==
Early Soviet test card (TIT-0249BIS, ТИТ-0249бис)

Radio was the dominant medium in the Soviet Union, however, in the 1930s preparations for television were in full swing. On 1 October 1934, the first television sets were made available to the public. The next year, the first television broadcasts began. The Soviet Union television service began full-time experimental test broadcasts on 1 March 1938. Regular public programming began on 9 March 1938 – with an evening of programs, which included news, documentary films, and entertainment on Channel 1 in Moscow. At the same time, Channel 5 Leningrad, the national television service from Leningrad and the northern Soviet Union, was launched on 7 July the same year.

Programs were stopped in 1941 at the start of Operation Barbarossa, for fear that the Shabolovka transmitter would be used as an enemy beacon. The same thing happened in Leningrad due to the almost four years siege of the city. The USSR television service began experimental test broadcasts on 7 May 1945 (two days before the German surrender), in preparation for its full reopening. On 15 December, the service resumed. Regular public programming resumed on 7 March 1948.

The USSR television service temporarily stopped broadcasts in December 1948 for a major upgrade of the broadcast equipment, but by 1 May the next year, Leningrad and the northern/northwestern USSR resumed television broadcasts for the Palace Square May Day Parade. Regular programming resumed on 16 June 1949, but was now broadcasting in 625 lines – a first in the world.

On 22 March 1951, Moscow TV was renamed, to avoid confusion by viewers about the forthcoming local channels, becoming the Central Television Station, later known as Programme 1. Leningrad's television service was also renamed Leningrad Television. It continued its national broadcasts. The following year, the Soviet government claimed that its television was the best in the world; among them was the reach of the transmitter, 200 kilometres for the Moscow transmitter against 80 kilometres from an American transmitter. Broadcasts were received from a long distance in Sweden by a radio technician in the middle of the year, four years before Sweden had its own television service, with reception from Moscow of a two-and-a-half hour variety programme.

On 26 August 1952, the Leningrad Television Centre was inaugurated, the USSR's first state-of-the-art television studio. Broadcasts were made available in Tomsk in early 1953, becoming the first city in Siberia to have access to television. The former Hermitage Cinema was retooled as a television viewing house on 25 December 1953. In October 1954, a 20-minute highlight film of a friendly match between British team Arsenal and Dynamo Moscow was broadcast on BBC Television.

On New Year's Day 1955 the Central Television Station began transmitting daily programming. On 14 February 1956, the new Moscow Programme commenced broadcasting for viewers in Moscow and in the surrounding Moscow Oblast. That same year it was announced that 75 new television stations were being set up and by 1960, Soviet Central Television would have an audience of 25 million.

The USSR television service (both Programme 1, Programme 2 and Moscow Programme) began experimental colour broadcast tests on 14 January 1960. The next year, Leningrad Television moved its studios and officers to larger premises.

The USSR authorities began construction of a television center in Ostankino in 1963 for the television networks. It was opened in 1967 as part of the celebrations for the 50th anniversary of the October Revolution. Leningrad would soon follow suit the next year as the newly renovated and expanded Leningrad Television Broadcasting Center reopened its doors.

On 29 March 1965, Programme Three commenced broadcasting. It was originally an educational channel. This channel was shown only in the major cities in the European USSR (e.g. Moscow and Leningrad), and its programming was co-produced with the USSR Ministry of Education, oriented towards the nation's student population at all levels from pre-school till college.

== Expansion ==
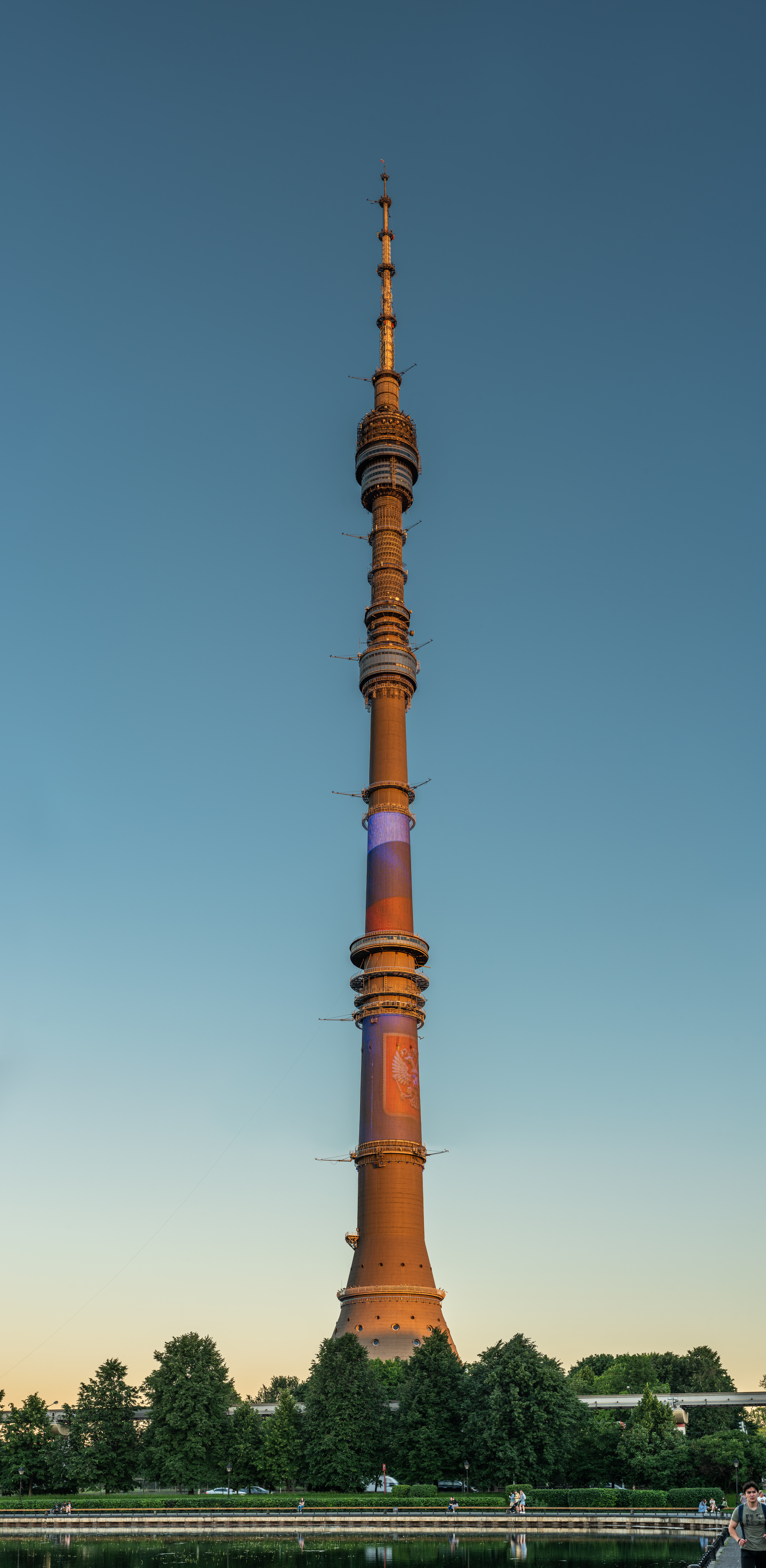
Ostankino Tower was built for expanding CT USSR's broadcast networks.

In 1965, CT USSR established a satellite network to expand the television service nationwide.

- 1965 – Experimental broadcast to the Far East via the Molniya system.
- 1967 – Ostankino Tower begins regular broadcasts in color covering Moscow and Central Russia.
- 1971 – Regular broadcasts begin in Siberia, the Far East and central Asia via the Orbita system.
- 1971 – The Vostok satellite begins programmes to viewers in Kazakhstan.
- 1976 – Ekran (Russian: Screen) satellite begins broadcasts. The satellite network for viewers in Soviet Asia (programmes were relayed by transmitter in the European side) was given the name "Orbita" in the same year.

In 1967, the all-new, youth, sport and entertainment network Programme 4 was launched. Programme 3, which was from the beginning available to Moscow only, began broadcasting to the entire USSR via satellite in 1982. Thus, it was renamed All-Union Programme for this purpose and moved to channel 2 in 1977, while Moscow Programme switched to channel 3. Science and technology programming formerly on Programme 4 moved to Programme 6 when that channel was launched on 25 December 1971.

=== Television programmes ===
==== News and current affairs ====
- Vremya: The main news programme (1968–).
- 600 Seconds: immensely popular TV news program (1987–1993).
- Serve the Soviet Union (Russian: Служу Советскому Союзу): Weekly telecast "of soldiers and for soldiers" (1960-s-1991), co-produced with the Ministry of Defense and the Soviet Armed Forces.
- Rural Hour: Program on agriculture, issues and rural workers (1969–1992).
- Today in the World: Information programme talking about events in the world (1978–1989).
- International Panorama: Sunday political telemagazine (1969–1987).
- People and the Law: Socio-political program (1970–).
- Moscow Panorama: features and news programme from Moscow.
- Moscow Saturdays: weekend news and current affairs programme.
- Leningrad News: newscast produced by Leningrad Television for viewers in Leningrad and Leningrad Oblast.

==== Entertainment, children's and youth programming ====
- Little Blue Light: Popular entertainment show. Shown on International Women's Day, May Day, and New Year's Eve (1962–1988).
- What? Where? When?: Intellectual game show (1975–).
- Fitil: Satirical/comedy short film serial (1962–1991).
- Budil'nik: Children's programme (1965–1998).
- Do 16 i starshe: Youth programme (1983–2001).
- Youth and the World: youth programme (1988–).
- Musical Ring: musical programme (1984–1990).
- Explorers Club (Russian: Клуб путешественников): Programme dedicated to promotion of tourism and travel (1960–2003).
- Kinopanorama: Programme about cinema (1962–1995).
- Before and after midnight: Infotainment program (1987–1991).
- ABVGDeyka: Children's educational program for preschool and primary school children. Transmission format – lessons in the form of game play, students act as clowns (1975– ).
- Come On, Girls!: Popular game program competition, was a television competition among girls, selected on a professional basis. Contestants competed for the title of best in the profession (1970–1987).
- Come On, Guys!: Popular game program competition (1970–1987).
- Kabachok (Thirteen Chairs): Comedy shows, the scene of which the plot is a Polish cafe (Zucchini). The program featured well-known Soviet actors and actresses (1966–1980). Shooting was terminated in November 1980 after an aggravation of the political situation in Poland – see Solidarity (Polish trade union).
- KVN (Club Cheerful and Resourceful): Popular television humorous game in which teams of different groups (schools, universities, businesses, etc.) compete in humorous responses to questions, improvisations on given themes, acting out scenes prepared in advance, etc. (1961–1972, 1986–)
- Melodies and Rhythms of Foreign Music: Musical entertainment television program devoted to foreign music, defined as "pop" (1977–1984).
- Poetry Almanac: program dedicated to poetry and to poets.

==== Educational, health, science and technology ====
- Ochevidnoye-neveroyatnoye: Popular science program (1973–1992).
- This You Can: Popular science program dedicated to scientific and technical creativity (1970s–1980s).
- Zdorovye: weekly popular science program on health (1960–1991).
- In the Animal World: Programme dedicated to zoology and wildlife research (1968–).

==== Sports ====
- Football Review: Weekly sports programme on the latest football events within the country and abroad

Notable annual traditions of the Soviet Central Television network included the telecasts of the Red Square demonstrations on May Day, Victory Day and the October Revolution anniversary parades, and the broadcast of the film The Irony of Fate (Or Enjoy Your Bath!) on New Year's Eve night, right before the CPSU General Secretary's New Year message, followed by the Kremlin chimes and the playing of Soviet national anthem, and ending with Little Blue Light New Year's Edition. Concerts and musical programs also commemorated these and other national holidays. Since 1971 it was also the official network for the USSR's Pesnya goda All-Union National Soviet Music Festival aired on New Year's Day, also soon becoming a holiday practice for viewers across the nation.

== Colour ==
Soviet test card used in TV broadcasts in the USSR after the introduction of colour (UEIT, УЭИТ)

=== OSKM ===
Test colour broadcasting started in Moscow as early as January 1960 using OSKM system (625 lines version of NTSC), but lasted only a few months. The OSKM abbreviation means "Simultaneous system with quadrature modulation" (In Russian: Одновременная Система с Квадратурной Модуляцией). It used the color coding scheme that was later used in PAL (YUV instead of YIQ), because it was based on D/K monochrome standard, 625/50. The color subcarrier frequency was 4.4296875 MHz and the bandwidth of UV chroma signals was near 1.5 MHz.

Only circa 4000 TV sets of 4 models (Raduga, Temp-22, Izumrud-201 and Izumrud-203) were produced for studying the real quality of TV reception. These TVs were not commercially available, despite being included in the goods catalog for trade network of the USSR. The broadcasting with this system lasted about 3 years and was ceased well before SECAM transmissions started in the USSR. None of the current multi-standard TV receivers can support this TV system.

=== SECAM ===
SÉCAM Colour television was introduced on 1 October 1967, making the Soviet Union the fourth country in Europe to switch to colour broadcast, after the United Kingdom's BBC2, West Germany's ARD and ZDF, and France's ORTF (see Timeline of the introduction of color television in countries), again ready for the celebrations for the 50th anniversary of the October Revolution on 7 November 1967. Moscow Programme and Leningrad Television were the first colour broadcasters, even though the 7 November 1967 parade was broadcast in monochrome on the main national channels and Programme 4. CT USSR chose the French SÉCAM colour standard, which would later be adopted across the Eastern Bloc such as East Germany, Poland, Czechoslovakia, Hungary, Bulgaria, the Mongolian People's Republic, North Korea and North Vietnam. A colour set in 1967 cost US$1,200.

By 1976, full-colour broadcasts began throughout the entire Soviet Union using the SECAM format on all television programs broadcast on all the national channels: Programme One, Programme Two, Moscow Programme, Programme Four and Programme Five – Leningrad Television, and in all the republican networks. That same year, Soviet Central Television displayed a US president for the first time - a fifteen-minute documentary of president-elect Jimmy Carter produced by the American government.

== Olympic Games ==
The hosting of the 1980 Summer Olympics by Moscow was a source of pride for the Eastern Bloc. However, the Soviet invasion of Afghanistan in 1979 had caused outrage in the west, leading to a boycott of the games by 64 western-aligned nations. CT USSR, as the host nation broadcaster, presented a colour broadcast of the Games to the world, and in Soviet territory the Games were broadcast on the two main channels with additional coverage on Program 3, Program 4 and Leningrad Television as well as the republican channels in Belarus, Ukraine (football) and Estonia (sailing). The other republican stations also simulcast and highlighted the entire event.

== Gorizont ==
In 1988, the USSR-built Gorizont satellite was launched, providing television programming to much of Europe and northern Africa, and even eastern parts of the Americas. The programmes of all the Eastern European socialist republics, including the CT USSR channels, were broadcast on the satellite.

== The reforms ==
Significant changes to CT USSR were made in the 1980s as the USSR underwent economic and popular political changes brought about by the reforms in Moscow under Mikhail Gorbachev. At first, CT USSR stuck to the party line and barely reported the opposition to the communist regime. However, after the rule of the CPSU began to break down in 1990, CT USSR reformed their programmes to remove propaganda and to report news freely.

By the time the Glasnost came into effect, the main news programme on the then Programme 1 (Vremya) was being produced without censorship or interference, and so it covered the events in full. In recognition of its reliable coverage, the programme was re-broadcast on several TV channels around the world (such as Australia's SBS and the United Kingdom's Sky News). CT USSR, at the same time, started a number of new programme strands and formats, including talk shows. On 4 March 1988, emphasizing the Glasnost campaign, Programme 3 and Programme 4, plus Leningrad Television began to be carried across the Soviet territory via satellite.

Private TV channels such as ATV and 2×2 were also introduced ending the state monopoly on television broadcasting. By 1990, CTV-USSR debuted its first joint international partnership program with the American Broadcasting Company, entitled Capital to Capital.

=== Dissolution of the USSR ===
Upon the total dissolution of the country on 26 December 1991, Soviet Central Television (by now part of the All-Union State Television and Radio Broadcasting Company due to a 8 February 1991 reform) ceased to be the state broadcaster of the USSR. On 27 December 1991, Ostankino Television 1 and Ostankino Television 4 (presently Channel One and NTV) took over the frequencies of Programme 1 and Programme 4. Leningrad Television 5 soon became St. Petersburg State Television Network, broadcasting to all of Russia until 1997.

Employees of CT USSR were worried about job prospects in the new broadcaster and also had a loyalty to Soviet Central Television. Viewers accustomed to the Russian programming, were concerned at the loss of favourite shows. (Some of the Soviet Central Television shows are now consigned to Channel One Russia and Russia 1) Additionally the three big Russian channels – Channel One, Russia 1 and Petersburg – Channel 5 – have a good amount of presence in the former Soviet territory, and most of the republican stations are now fully independent.

== Former television stations ==
Soviet Central Television had three and later six national television channels over its history. The six channels were joined by a number of regional television stations operated by the republican governments of each of the 14 other republics, city television stations operated by the city governments in several key cities and television stations of the governments of the autonomous republics of the Union. Today, these stations, now independent, maintain separate national identities and programming.

=== National stations ===
- Programme One – was formed in 1938, and began to broadcast a regular daily schedule in 1955. This was the main channel in the Soviet Union and was a crucial tool for the dissemination of propaganda by the Communist Party of the Soviet Union. Its output included general entertainment, documentaries and news. In 1991 this channel became 1st channel Ostankino (now Channel One).
- Programme Two – was created in 1956. Its programmes was mostly entertainment, cultural, news and sport programming. This is also called the All-Union Program due to its national reach across the Soviet Union and the fact that even programs of all forms from the various Union republics were also broadcast here. In 1991 this channel became Russia-1.
- Moscow Programme – was created in 1965, the second channel to be launched. Its programming was somewhat similar to Program One, but was more flavored at the Moscow City and Oblast citizens. Presently it is TV Centr.
- Programme Four – was created in 1967. Its programming was aimed at the intelligentsia and students at all levels.
- Leningrad Programme – the national television service from Leningrad (Saint Petersburg) and the northern and northwestern USSR was created in 1938, four months after the birth of television in the Soviet Union. Programmes from Leningrad City and Oblast were aired here, plus occasionally those from the USSR's Baltic republics (the republics also had their share on Program 2, the All-Union Program). Until 1988 select Moscow Programme productions were aired.
- Technical Programme – opened in 1971, was the channel for broadcasts of scientific and technological programming, until 1980 assigned as an emergency channel for civil defense measures during wartime. At first it was offered in Moscow and several other cities. Today, Programme 6 is the sports channel Match TV.

=== Regional stations ===
- Baltic Programme was created in 1954 in Riga as the television bureau of CT-USSR for viewers in the Baltic, with additional stations later created in Tallinn (1955) and Vilnius (1957). In 1957 the channel was split into three stations: Riga Television, Vilnius Television and Tallinn Television for viewers in each of the three republics. Today, these stations are the independent Latvijas Televīzija, Eesti Televisioon and LRT televizija. (Tallinn Television had already adopted the Eesti Televisioon brand in 1965.)
- Byelorussian Programme – was created in 1956 to serve viewers in Byelorussia, offering both national and local programming.
- Ukrainian Programme
- Caucasus Programme was created in 1955 in Baku as the television bureau of CT-USSR for viewers in the Caucasus, with additional stations later created in Yerevan and Tbilisi (1956). In 1956 the channel was split into three stations: Baku Television, Tbilisi Television and Yerevan Television for viewers in each of the three republics. Today, these stations are the independent AzTV, Public Television Company of Armenia and First Channel (Georgian TV channel). (Baku Television had already adopted the AzTV brand in 1965.)
- Kazakh Programme
- Kyrgyz Programme
- Tajik Programme – was created in 1959, construction of radio relay lines (RLL technical stations) was started. According to statistics, in 1962 there were 29,000 TVs in Dushanbe and the surrounding areas. At the end of 1962, the Dushanbe-Kulob radio relay line was put into operation, television transmitters were built in Qurghonteppa and Toshrabot, allowing the residents of Kulob and Vakhsh Valley to watch television in Tajikistan.
- Turkmen Programme
- Moldovan Programme
- Uzbek Programme

== Appearances ==
=== Identity ===
In 1982, there were three idents which were broadcast each day on CT USSR.

- Startup ident: The blue background with CT USSR's logo (see below) appearing, first the red star (with one point extended) with the phrase TB CCCP (TV USSR), followed by the rings and the caption changing to the channel's name. Broadcast after the national anthem and before the exercise programme in the morning, and before the news in the evening (see Sign-on). The tune played during this ident is taken from the theme of the 1932 Soviet film Counterplan (composed by Dmitri Shostakovich).
- Daytime ident: Still version of the startup ident.
- Closedown ident: The reverse of the startup ident, but with a different tune taken from the Soviet music Quiet, Everything Quiet (Тихо, всё тихо) by Isaak Dunayevsky. Followed by the clock.

=== Sign On ===
As of 1990, Soviet Central Television (Programme One, Programme Two and Moscow Programme) sign on at about 6:30 and 12:00 with the test card along with music, clock ident, then the national anthem accompanied by a panoramic view of Moscow, the capital of the Soviet Union and station ident.

=== Sign Off ===
As of 1990, Soviet Central Television (Programme One, Programme Two and Moscow Programme) signed off at about 02:00 with the station ident, Clock ident, caption "Do not forget to turn off the TV". Also, there was a sign off in the noon, beginning around in 1 pm and by 2:30 to 4 pm there was the second daily sign on with various news and entertainment programs shown until late night.

=== News ===
- 1938–1967: Newsreel intro.
- 1967–1984: Blue background with "Новости" next to a red star. Still and silent intro.
- 1984–1986: Blue background with "Новости" moving from right to left. Background music was The Patriotic Song by Mikhail Glinka.
- 1986–1990: Blue background with "Новости" moving from right to left, with a stylized "H". Background music was Time, Forward! by Georgy Sviridov.
- 1990: The letters T, C and H appear to form TCH – Телевизионная служба новостей (Television News Service).

=== Test card ===
The UEIT test card was used.

=== Colour TV standard ===
When colour television was introduced in 1967, the SÉCAM system was chosen. Following the collapse of the USSR, some of its former republics switched to the PAL colour system.

== Finance ==
Broadcasting in the USSR was heavily subsidized by the state.

Advertising – in the form of "commercial" magazine programmes – appeared on Soviet television from the 1980s. However, the command economy had little or no competition between brands, so advertising was limited to informing viewers of the prices and availability of products. With perestroika, spot advertising was introduced to CT USSR in order to better cover the system's cost.

== In popular culture ==
The satirical TV series Second City Television did a 1980 episode consisting of skits centered around a Russian satellite signal overriding the SCTV satellite and causing Russian TV to be broadcast on SCTV's signal, with Soviet Central Television satirized as 'CCCP1' (Three CP One) and 'CCCP2' (Three CP Two) and containing further satires of Russian programing with shows like Tibor's Tractor (a farmer has a tractor that is the reincarnation of Nikita Khrushchev, spoofing My Mother The Car), Hey Georgy (a man wanders around Russia helping everybody, spoofing King of Kensington), and a daytime show, Today is Moscow. The episode is featured on SCTV DVD Volume 2.

== See also ==
- Culture of the Soviet Union
- Television in the Soviet Union
