= Programme Four =

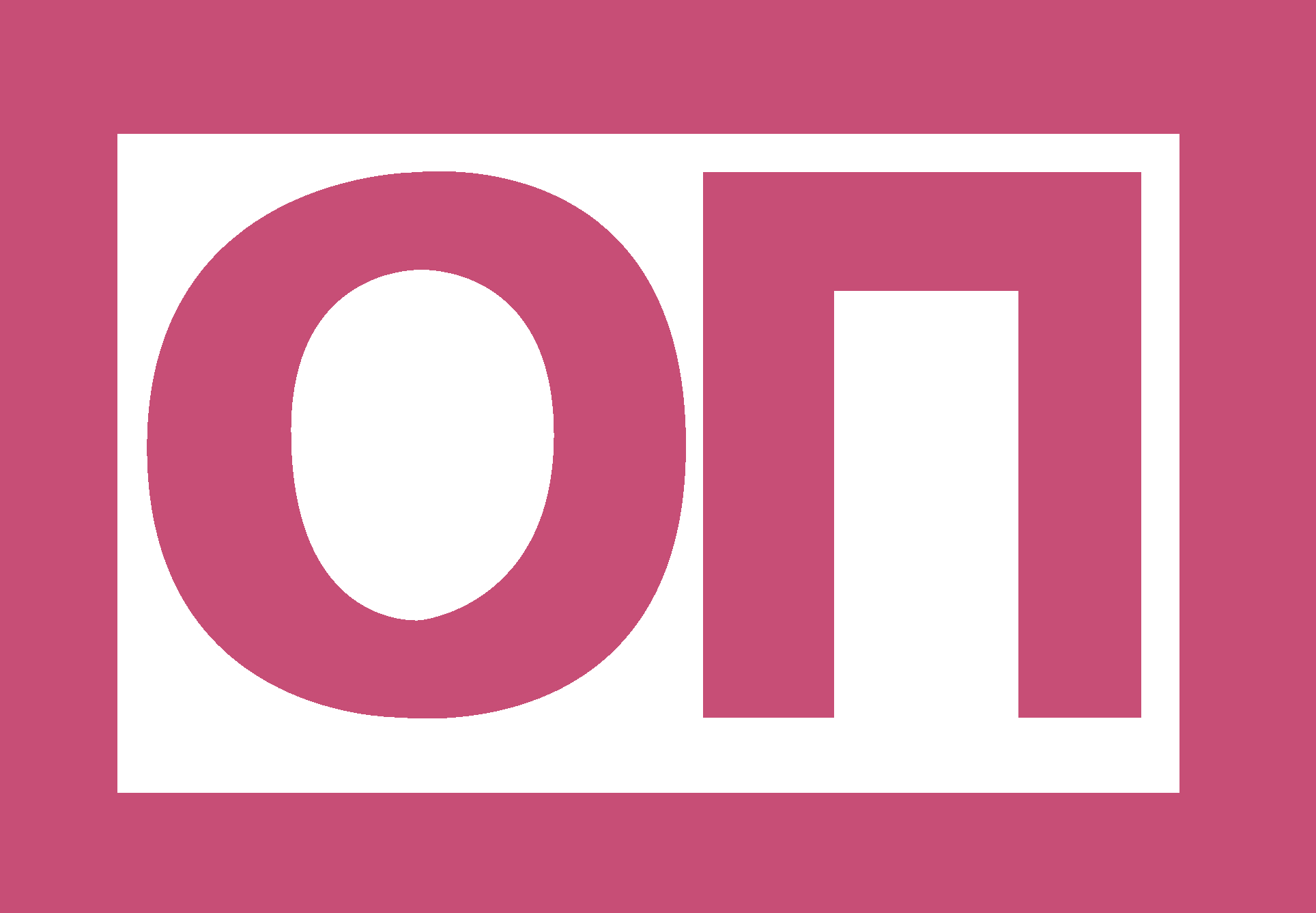
- Country: Soviet Union (1967–1991); Russia (1991–1992)
- Broadcast area: Nationwide
- Network: Soviet Central Television
- Headquarters: Ostankino Technical Center

Programming
- Language: Russian
- Picture format: SECAM (576i 4:3 SDTV)
- Timeshift service: Based on Orbita system

Ownership
- Owner: Gostelradio (1967—1991); All-Union GTRK (1991); RGTRK «Ostankino» (1991—1992)
- Sister channels: Programme One; Programme Two (1967—1991); Moscow Programme (1967—1992); 1st channel Ostankino (1991—1992)

History
- Launched: 4 November 1967; 58 years ago
- Closed: 13 April 1992; 34 years ago, 1:00
- Replaced by: Russian Universities; 4th channel Ostankino
- Former names: Fourth Programme (1967–1988); Educational Programme (1988–1992)

Program Four (Russian: Четвёртая программа ЦТ) was one of the channels of the Soviet Central Television, active from 1967 until 1992 when it was replaced by Russian Universities channel.

== History ==
=== 1967–1981: The Fourth Program of the Central Television ===
The creation of the Fourth Program of the Central Television was timed to coincide with the 50th anniversary of the October Revolution. The program began broadcasting on 4 November 1967 on the 11th frequency channel in Moscow and the Moscow region. According to the deputy chairman of the State Committee of Television and Radio Broadcasting of the Soviet Union for television Georgy Ivanov, the creation of the "Fourth Program of the Central Television" was intended "for people with heightened cultural demands." In terms of subject matter, it was an artistic and cultural-educational program (in fact, the analogue of this program in modern Russia is the Kultura TV channel). The "Fourth Program of the Central Television" aired programs about literature and other types of art, concerts, television plays, documentaries, and feature films. A number of TV programmes were filmed in a format that was new for Soviet television – the discussion club format: experts invited to the studio debated various issues in science, culture, and social life (some of the recorded programmes were not allowed to air due to censorship). The channel broadcast in the evening: programmes began at around 19:00. In the early 1970s, the concept of a cultural and educational programme was abandoned. From that moment on, the Fourth Programme of CT began to be defined as primarily sports and art, while its programmes were of various genres. A significant part of the programming consisted of reruns of the First Programme of CT programmes. In 1977, the distribution area of the Fourth Programme of CT expanded sharply: in the regions of the Soviet Union, the Second Programme of CT was replaced by the Fourth Programme of CT. As of 1978, the Fourth Program of CT was already broadcasting in 34 regions of the European part of the USSR and the capitals of nine union republics (the process of expanding the coverage area of the Fourth Program of CT to the territory of the USSR continued in subsequent years, and in 1982, this program was transferred to the Second Program of CT and given the status of all-Union).

=== 1982–1988: Fourth (educational) program of CT ===
On 1 January 1982, the Fourth Program of CT changed its subject matter to educational and cognitive. Until 1982, the educational channel was broadcast on the "Third Program of the Central Television", and from 1 January 1982, it began to be broadcast on two programs, the Second Program of the Central Television (weekdays in the morning and afternoon) and the Fourth (educational) program of the Central Television (weekdays in the evening and on Saturdays all day). In total, the educational channel's broadcast volume on both programs averaged 12-13 hours per day. The broadcast time of the "Fourth (educational) program of the Central Television" also changed - broadcasts began to begin, as a rule, around 16:00 on weekdays and around 8:00 on Saturdays. "The fourth (educational) program of the Central Television" was aimed at schoolchildren and young students, as well as an adult audience (in particular, programs were broadcast to help doctors, teachers, specialists in the national economy, and television lessons for those studying foreign languages independently). Educational programs (lessons, lectures, documentaries), historical films, and screen versions of Russian and world classics were broadcast. A number of programs were broadcast precisely when a given topic or book was being studied in schools (such screenings were called "To Help the School"). Programs for students were intended both for showing in class and for individual viewing. Institutions of higher education also had viewing rooms in which students watched educational cycles intended for them. Scientists, writers, artists, and the best teachers were invited as hosts and participants in educational programs. Educational programs were filmed taking into account the advice of psychologists, methodologists, and teachers.

During major sporting events, the channel broadcast sports programs all day without commentators and basically took full responsibility for itself, since the Sixth Program of CT broadcast had a very weak transmitter. During school holidays, the First Program of the Central Television was broadcast. During repair work on the transmitters of other programs, the Fourth (educational) Program of the Central Television took over the broadcast of the main programs.

=== 1988–1991: Educational Program of CT ===
On 16 January 1988, the program was renamed the Educational Program of the Central Television (its subject matter remained the same - educational and cognitive). Broadcasting times changed: programs began to be broadcast not only on weekdays and Saturdays, but also on Sundays. At the same time, the start of programs on weekdays and weekends was moved to a later time (as a rule, programs began at 20:00). From the very beginning of 1989, the program began to broadcast on weekends in the morning and during the day. On 18 November 1991, it began to broadcast on weekdays from 18:00 (previously from 19:00), a morning program was added from 11:00 until the beginning of the afternoon break, and the showing of repeats of feature films of Central Television was transferred from the daytime broadcast of the Second Program of Central Television.

On 27 December 1991, as a result of the dissolution of the Soviet Union, and the reorganization of the All-Union State Television and Radio Broadcasting Company into the Ostankino Television and Radio Broadcasting Company, the television channel was reformed into the 4th channel Ostankino but remained under the control of the Government of Russia. The space was later reused as NTV upon its launch in 1994.
