= Ostankino Technical Center =

Russian television studio

Ostankino Television Technical Center
- Телевизионный технический центр Остaнкино
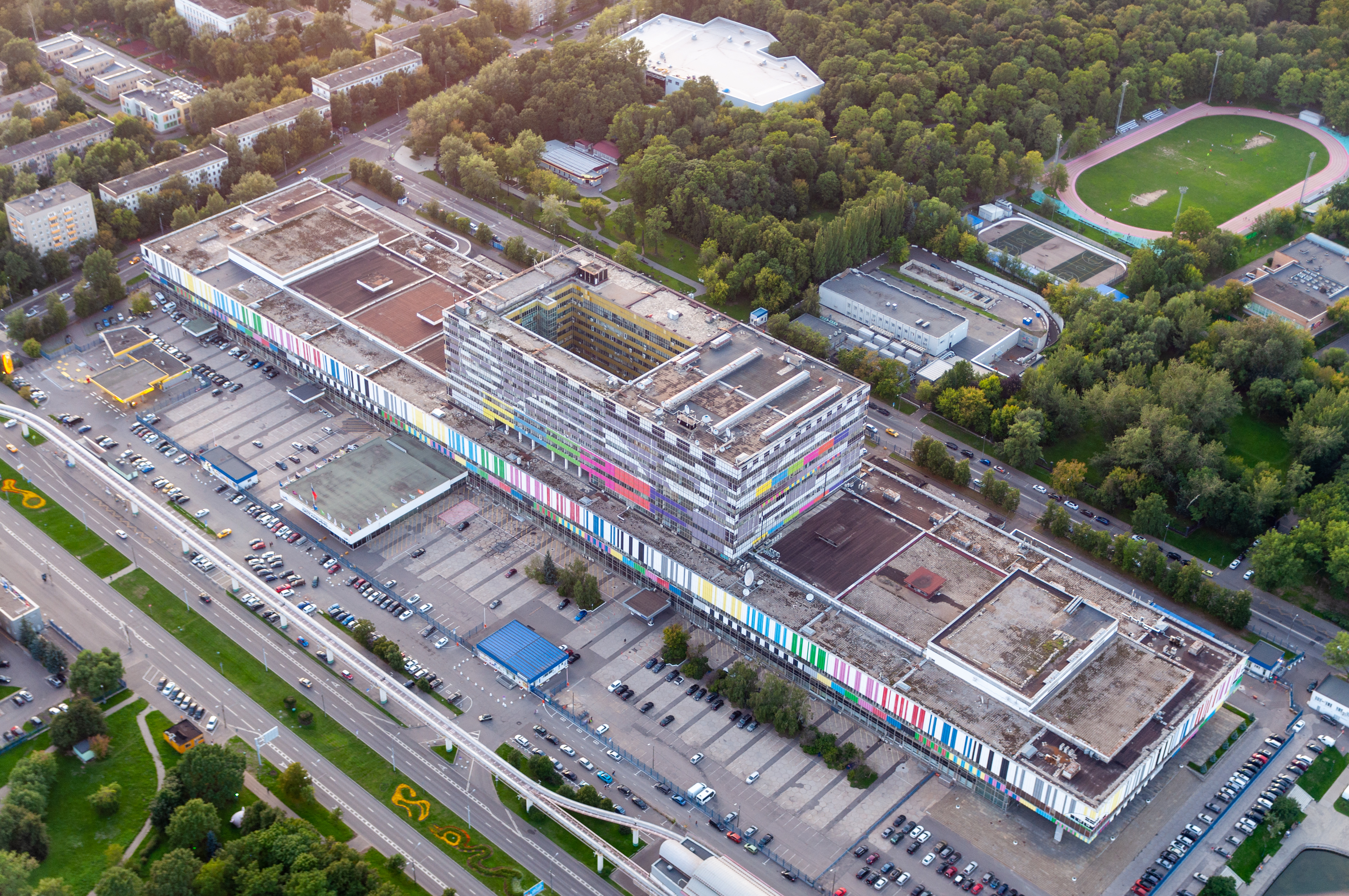

General information
- Location: 12, Akademika Korolyova Street, Moscow, Russia
- Coordinates: 55°49′23″N 37°36′23″E
- Construction started: 1964
- Completed: 1967
- Owner: Federal Agency for Press and Mass Media

Height
- Height: 52 m

Design and construction
- Architect: Leonid Batalov

Other information
- Public transit: Moscow Metro: Butyrskaya; Teletsentr

Website
- www.ostankino.ru

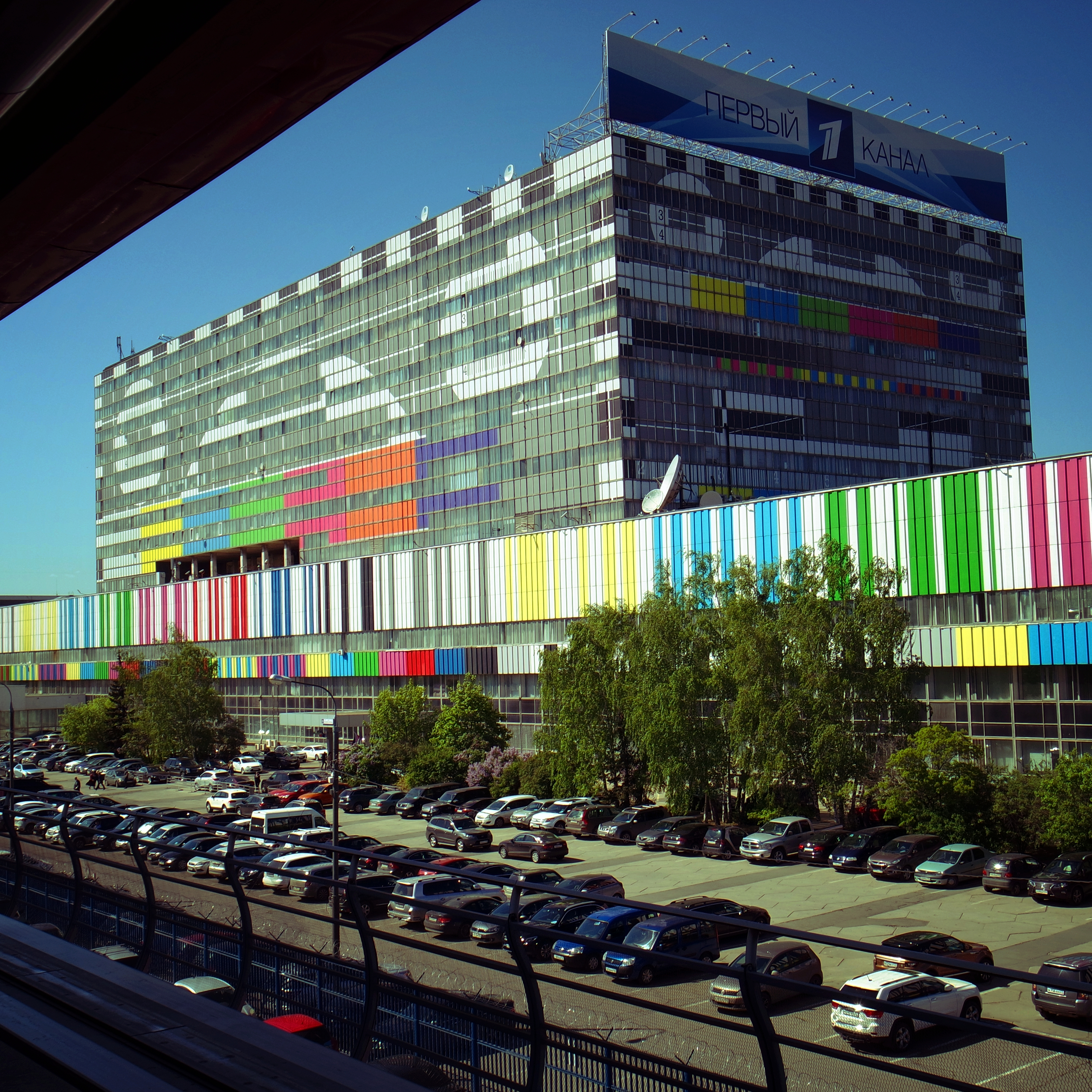
TV test card drawn on facade of Ostankino Technical Center (May, 2016)

Ostankino Television Technical Center (Russian: Телевизионный технический центр Оста́нкино им. 50-летия Октября) is a television studio and technical center in Moscow, Russia for Channel One Russia. The center provides ongoing technical support to multiple broadcasters in the country.

== History ==
It was created on 10 March 1939, within the framework of the People's Commissariat of Communications of the Soviet Union as the Moscow Television Center, whose only studio, control room, and room with television radio transmitters were located in a newly constructed building. In October 1940, it was transferred to the Committee for Radiofication and Radio Broadcasting of the Council of People's Commissars of the Soviet Union. The MTC housed its editorial offices, administrative and management personnel, including the office of its director, from which the only television program in Moscow at that time was broadcast through antennas installed on its television tower.

On 1 January 1950, it was again transferred to the Soviet Ministry of Communications, and the creative part was separated into the Department of Television Broadcasting, which remained within the framework of the Committee for Radio Information of the Council of Ministers of the Soviet Union, a year later reorganized into the CST. In 1957, a second building of the MTC was built and a second studio was opened. The First Programme was broadcast from the MTC studio complex, and since 1956 also the Moscow program from the ASC studio since 1956 the Latest News was broadcast, since 1960 - Television News, as well as announcer inserts were broadcast and films were broadcast from the antennas installed on the MTC television tower, television channels were transmitted via radio waves, here were also located the program directorate and thematic editorial offices of the Soviet Central Television since the mid-1960s - the Main Directorate of Programs and thematic main editorial offices of the Central Television, its administrative and management apparatus, including the office of its director and the administrative and management apparatus of the MTC.

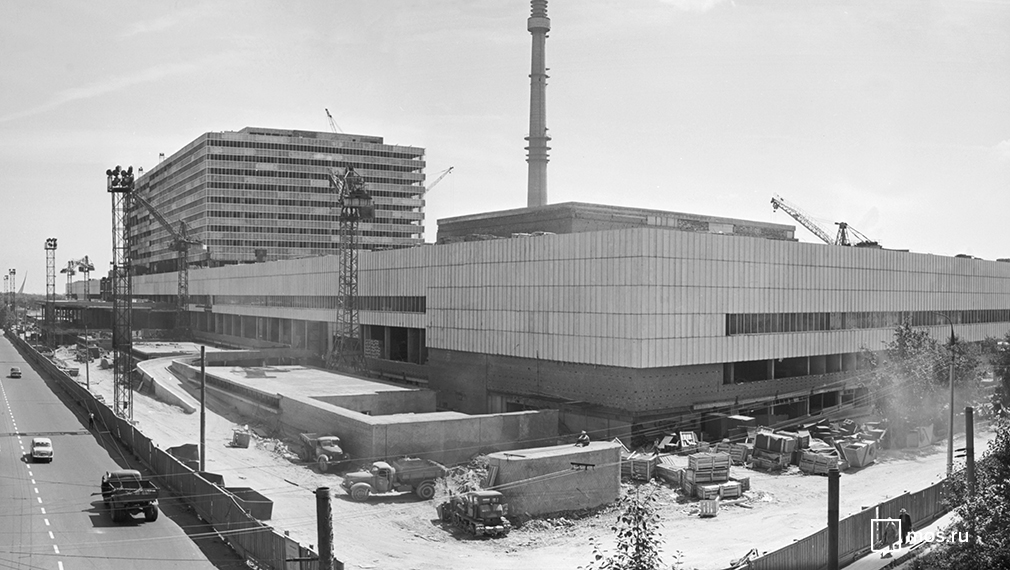
The center under construction (July 1967)

On 12 August 1960, the Moscow Television Center was transferred to the State Committee of Television and Radio Broadcasting of the Soviet Union, the transmitting television stations and VHF-FM broadcasting stations, as well as the antenna-feeder devices, were left as part of the Soviet Ministry of Communications and were reorganized into the Moscow Radio Transmitting Television Station. On 22 April 1964, the order was given to build the television center, and on 4 November 1967, the television center was erected. On 5 November 1967, to mark the half-century anniversary of the October Revolution of 1917, the Moscow Television Center was transferred the hardware and studio complex built that same year at 12 Akademika Korolev Street, which became ASK-1, the hardware and studio complex on 37 Shabolovka street which by that time already had 6 studio-equipment blocks, in which the main editorial office of popular science and educational programs and the main editorial office of programs for children and their studios remained, became ASK-2, the Moscow Television Center itself was renamed the Television Technical Center named after the 50th Anniversary of October.

In the studio-equipment blocks and video recording blocks of the three-story studio building, the preparation of Soviet Central Television programs, production and dubbing of the Creative Association "Ekran" own films and cartoons, dubbing of foreign films and cartoons by the Main Editorship of Film Programs of the Central Television were carried out. The ten-story editorial block (initially, a 26-story building of the ASC was planned) housed the main directorate of Soviet Central Television programs, thematic main editorial offices of Central Television, editorial groups of the studios of the creative association "Ekran" (later Soyuztelefilm), the administrative and managerial apparatus of the Television Technical Center. From its hardware and software blocks, the broadcasting of Central Television programs was carried out, live broadcasts of the announcer's text in the news and the information program Vremya and between broadcasts on the Programme One and Programme Two of Soviet Central Television, from its hardware and software telecinema blocks - the broadcasting of films and cartoons on the programs of Central Television. The mobile television stations of the TTC broadcast television concerts with the participation of spectators from the TTC concert studio and other concert halls, filmed television performances from the television theater, filmed performances from other theaters, and broadcast live various events, including sports events from stadiums.

In 1980, the Olympic television and radio complex on 19 Academician Korolev str, which became ASK-3, which housed the sports editorial office of the State Committee of Television and Radio Broadcasting of the Soviet Union, the announcer department of the Soviet Central Television, the Main Information Editorial Office of the Soviet Central Television, the Main Directorate of Programs and thematic main editorial offices of the Central Intra-Union Radio Broadcasting, where live broadcasts of the information program Vremya and “News”, “Latest News”, information releases of Radio Mayak, socio-political programs of the Central Intra-Union Radio Broadcasting were carried out, the latter were recorded, and radio programs recorded in the State House of Radio Broadcasting and Sound Recording were broadcast.

On 7 May 1992, the television center became a subordinate enterprise of the Russian State Television and Radio Broadcasting Company Ostankino, which was created on 27 December 1991 on the basis of the All-Union State Television and Radio Broadcasting Company. Part of the production capacity of the television center of the Russian State Television and Radio Broadcasting Company began to be used by itself: in the hardware and studio blocks and video recording blocks of ASK-1, programs and films of the subsidiaries of the television and radio company and other organizations (VID Television Company, ATV, TV Company REN TV, etc.) were prepared on their orders; from the hardware and software blocks of ASK-1, the television and radio company produced television programs, films and advertisements on the 1st and 4th channels of Ostankino Television Company; from the hardware and software blocks of ASK-3, direct transmission of the announcer's text of television and radio news of the television and radio company, production of radio programs and direct transmission of the announcer's text of the radio programs Radio-1, Radio Mayak and Radio Rossii of the All-Russia State Television and Radio Broadcasting Company were carried out. Some of the production capacity began to be used by other organizations. The hardware and software units of ASK-3 produced broadcasts of the All-Russia State Television and Radio Broadcasting Company (RTR TV channel) (their preparation was carried out in ASK-2, which was transferred to VGTRK in the fall of 1991), as well as AOZT Moscow Independent Broadcasting Corporation (TV-6 Moscow), TV company Severnaya Korona and 2×2 TV channel The hardware and software units of ASK-1 produced broadcasts of Moscow Television Channel, TOO Delovoy Mir, ZAO Europa Plus, Delovaya Volna station, M-Radio and AOZT Independent Non-State Television and Radio Broadcasting Company Resonance. Independent enterprise (since 1993)

On 7 September 1993, the Television Technical Center was removed from the control of the Russian State Television and Radio Broadcasting Company Ostankino. It was planned to make it a subsidiary joint-stock company of the Russian State Television and Radio Broadcasting Center Efir, but this joint-stock company was not created. The Decree of the President of Russia of 6 October 1995 ordered the Government of Russia to transform the Television Technical Center into a state unitary enterprise.

Currently, the leading television broadcasting organizations of the country such as Channel One, NTV, Public Television of Russia, National Sports Channel and Karusel broadcast television programs from the hardware and software units; the producers such as VID Television Company, Krasny Kvadrat and Ostankino Television Company produce television programs in the hardware and studio units. Some of the production capacities of the television cinema hardware and studio units were idle, for example, the camera shop is currently located in the hardware and studio unit where the animated television films of the Ekran Creative Association were produced on the 1st floor of ASK-1.

Since 2 March 2008, all of Channel One's news programs (Vremya, Novosti, Vechernie Novosti, Odnako) have been broadcast from two news studios - a large one and a small one. The news program directorate has stopped using studio tapes and has completely switched to computer video editing.

== Construction ==
The thirteen story building of the Ostankino television complex is constructed of glass and concrete. The end of the building, facing the direction of the Ostankino pond, is different from all the other sides. The building volume exceeds 1 million cubic meters. The total height of the building is 52 meters and it has a useful area of 154 thousand square meters.

== See also ==
- Ostankino Tower
