= Sergey Cheskidov =

- Born: 10 October 1947 (age 78); Sverdlovsk, RSFSR, USSR
- Occupations: journalist, television presenter, sports commentator

Sergey Yurievich Cheskidov (Russian: Серге́й Ю́рьевич Чески́дов; born 10 October 1947, Sverdlovsk) is a Soviet and Russian sports commentator, broadcaster, former head of the editorial board sports channel TV Tsentr.

== Biography ==
He studied at the Lesgaft National State University of Physical Education, Sport and Health.

In 1968–1970 - the figure skating coach in Perm, President of the Perm Regional Federation of figure skating.

In 1970-1975 - one of the founders and trainer Olympic reserve school CSKA.

Among his best students - the world champion among juniors Tatiana Gladkova, Igor Shpilband, Alexey Soloviev, the world champion, Europe and silver medalist Marina Cherkasova, winner of the World Cup Anna Kondrashova. Some skaters were runners-up of the Soviet Union Championship for Juniors and Young Riders.

Since 1976, he has worked on TV.

In 1976–1991 - the reporter, commentator, Soviet Central Television, in particular, the program Vremya, the program Arena in the late 1980s - early 1990s (with Anna Dmitrieva), Chrono (about racing together Alexey Popov). Producer of TV coverage of international figure skating tournament for the prizes of the newspaper Moskovskiye Novosti.

Co-producer of TV coverage of the Olympics-80 in Moscow, the Goodwill Games 1986, IIHF World Championship (1979 and 1985), the European Figure Skating Championships (1990).

His commentating style combined emotional descriptions, with analysis based on knowledge of the game and facts. Also innovated by inviting athletes and experts to participate in reporting for context. Commentated broadcast with the Intercontinental Cup and FIFA World Hockey Championship for the channel TV Tsentr.
