= 2×2 (TV channel) =

Russian television channel

- Country: Russia
- Broadcast area: Nationwide
- Headquarters: Moscow, Russia

Programming
- Language: Russian
- Picture format: 1080i HDTV (downscaled to 576i for the SD feed)

Ownership
- Owner: Gazprom-Media (2014–present)

History
- Launched: 1 November 1989; 37 years ago (original); 1 September 2003; 23 years ago (relaunch); 11 April 2018; 8 years ago (Internet broadcasting)
- Founder: OJSC «TV and radio Company "2x2"»
- Replaced: Moscow Programme
- Closed: 9 June 1997; 29 years ago (original, VHF channel 3); 26 July 1997; 29 years ago (UHF channel 51); 1 January 2016; 10 years ago (UHF channel 60)
- Replaced by: TV Center (VHF channel 3); Muz-TV (UHF channel 51); TNT4 (UHF channel 60)

Links
- Website: 2x2tv.ru media.2x2tv.ru

2x2 (Russian: Дважды два, romanized: Dvazhdy dva, lit. 'Two Times Two') is a Russian television channel. Founded in 1989, it was the first commercial TV station in the Soviet Union. The channel was shut down from 1997 to 2003, at which point it was started up again. Since then, the channel has predominantly broadcast foreign animated TV series, including children's television series, anime, and adult animation shows (similar to the American channel Adult Swim).

2x2 began trial broadcasting in July 1989 on the Moscow Programme frequency, becoming the first commercial television channel in the USSR and Russia. Full broadcasting began on 1 November 1989. The network's programming was initially composed of advertising blocks, modern Soviet and Western music videos, cartoons, and TV series.

Starting on April 1, 2007, an animated Russian channel began broadcasting content aimed at a teen and adult audience under the name of 2x2.

Since 2014, the channel has been part of the holding company Gazprom-Media. As of April 2017, it employs 45 people. The channel applied for inclusion in the second multiplex of digital terrestrial television in Russia, but failed to win the competition held by the Roskomnadzor.

== History ==
=== Trial period (July–October 1989) ===
The channel was established by order of the USSR State Committee of Television and Radio Broadcasting as a structural subdivision within the General Directorate of Programs (GDP). Trial broadcasting began in July 1989 on Channel 3 in Moscow and the Moscow Oblast under the name "Commercial TV Channel". The channel was broadcast in the daytime, as the frequency was reserved for the state-owned Moscow Programme for evening broadcasts. The duration of the "Commercial TV Channel" broadcasts was not fixed.

=== Infotainment channel (1989–1997) ===
The name "2x2" was coined by the staff around July 1989. Sergey Lavrov, the artist on staff, developed the general style of the channel and the original logo. On 1 November 1989, the channel began broadcasting under its own name on the frequency of the Moscow Programme.

In 1993, 2x2 launched on satellite, which resulted in the retransmission of its programs by some regional affiliates. Before going to satellite, the channel broadcast only in Moscow and the Moscow Oblast, and through its own transmitters in Tver and Ryazan, with the signal being delivered in real time via terrestrial RRL.

In 1995, according to opinion polls, 1st channel Ostankino and its successor ORT had significantly lower viewership than 2x2 in the daytime. At the time of the closure of the old 2x2 (in the spring of 1997), the ratings situation in the morning and daytime changed in favor of ORT, and the average daily share of channel viewership was approximately 1% of the television audience, which was equivalent to the indicators of STS and REN TV, as well as the Fifth Channel; the Moscow channel MTK had similar rating problems.

2x2's broadcasts on VHF channel 3 ended exactly at midnight on the night of 8–9 June 1997 due to the expiration of license number 15 from 8 June 1992, issued for 5 years. At 7:00 Moscow time on 9 June, the channel gave up its place on VHF channel 3 (corresponding to the "third button" on television sets in Moscow at the time) to the new channels Moskovia and TV Centre, moving to the UHF band, to channel 51, where from 7:00 to 11:00 and from 19:00 to 3:00 on weekdays and from 9:00 to 14:00 and from 19:00 to 3:00 on weekends Muz-TV was broadcast (in the printed programs were transferring, reporting directly to the Muz-TV). 2x2 broadcast on channel 51 from 11:00 to 19:00 on weekdays and from 14:00 to 19:00 on weekends, with extremely low-quality content and the predominance of teleshopping.

On 26 July 1997, the channel stopped broadcasting to Moscow and the Moscow Oblast on channel 51. For a long time after the closure of the old 2x2, the company "2x2-Telemarket" existed, which was the exclusive owner of the rights to a number of films, documentaries, animated series, and television series broadcast by the channel before 1997 on the territory of Russia. Later, AFK Sistema acquired 2x2.

==== Broadcasting schedule ====
The lack of a strict broadcasting schedule and the format of six-time repetition of the same block of entertainment programs and advertising, which were the result of limited financial resources and the small number of programs at 2x2's disposal, largely played a role in the growth of its popularity. The channel broadcast in the format of "background television". TV sets in offices, stores, cafes, and other public places and institutions were often tuned to 2x2. At that time, 2x2 was the only domestic TV channel that showed music videos, distinguishing it from several existing Soviet TV channels. The channel was highly popular with Soviet schoolchildren, who, while waiting for a 20-minute block of music videos, often also watched advertising blocks that sometimes lasted for 40 minutes without a break. According to a survey of 586 high school students in Moscow schools, conducted in late 1991, the channel became the most popular: it was watched by 34.16% of respondents.

From June 1990 to 31 May 1992, the channel broadcast programs from the British channel Super Channel. Their share in the broadcast network almost immediately dominated - one- or two-hour selections of video clips were broadcast (the All Mixed Up program, the SPIN WIN hit parade, made up of modern popular clips), sports), and films. Some educational programs were also broadcast, including those produced by the Discovery Channel, including "After 2000".

From mid-1991, the channel began to broadcast the anime Macron 1. In October 1991, a legal entity Enterprise «TV channel 2x2» was re-registered as LLP Company «TV Channel 2x2».

Starting around 1992, the channel began airing "Green Corridor", a program about heavy and rock music produced by the "BIZ Enterprises" production studio of entrepreneur Boris Zosimov. Subsequently, the channel's musical policy was almost entirely controlled by Zosimov, as a result of which in 1993 the channel's management signed a contract with the owners of MTV Europe for the retransmission of some of the channel's programs (for example, on the night of 1 January 1994, an ABBA concert was shown). At first, clips from MTV Europe were broadcast during the day between series and other programs; they were broadcast quite often, including VJ blocks, often even without translation. Among the programs were also episodes of the animated series Beavis and Butt-Head. Soon, sponsored clips of Russian performers, such as Vlad Stashevsky and Yevgeny Kemerovovsky began to take the place of MTV clips more and more. By the summer of 1994, there remained a daily hour-long selection of clips from MTV (aired after midday), which soon also stopped. Music videos, but no longer from MTV, were occasionally broadcast thereafter, still during breaks between series.

Despite the fact that some of Zosimov's ideas did not justify themselves, he continued to occupy part of the airtime on 2x2, creating the television production company "BIZ-TV". Within its framework, a number of musical programs were aired and almost all of the channel's musical components were formed. Also within the framework of this project, the program "Forgotten Names" was aired, dedicated to Soviet estrada, which later moved to the TV-6 channel, where it was aired as part of the program "Disk-kanal" as "Spinning Disks". The hosts of the program were Kirill Nemolyaev and Nikolai Semashko. Since 2 July 1992, instead of the daytime show of feature films of Central television, the TV channel began to carry out reruns of series going to MTK, the first of which was "Nobody but you".

From 1992 to 1994, the channel broadcast news from BBC, CBS, ITN, and Worldnet in the morning and evening, and one of the morning broadcasts was always aired without translation. The broadcasts were translated into Russian by a simultaneous interpreter, VHS translator Peter Kartsev, who also worked at TV-6.

In 1993–1994, 2x2 regularly aired Greenpeace commercials, and therefore Joanna Stingray and Boris Grebenshchikov often appeared on the channel. From 1993, newscasts were aired (at first they were broadcast in the middle of each hour, less often at the end of the final hour, later at the beginning of each hour, in the format of short news blocks). A half-hour weekly program of Aum Shinrikyo was also broadcast.

In 1994, the channel had problems with the Australian television series Chances, which gradually moved from melodrama to a more explicit erotic genre.

In 1994–1995, the channel reached the peak of its popularity due to its diverse broadcasting schedule and broadcasts of such programs as Dandy — New Reality and such animated series as Teenage Mutant Ninja Turtles. The creative concept of the TV channel was based on the principle of "family broadcasting", designed for the preferences of each typical family member. Thus, advertising blocks were addressed to entrepreneurs, cartoons and animated series to children, soap operas to housewives, and music videos and programs to young people. The slogan of the 2x2 at the time was "We just work for you! TV channel 2x2".

In 1996, the anime series Sailor Moon started airing on the channel, its first broadcast in Russia. The broadcast of Mexican-made telenovelas also continued, including Tú o nadie, Mi segunda madre, and Caminos cruzados. Such series as Thunder in Paradise, Highlander: The Series, Sledge Hammer!, and Lassie were also aired.

=== AST-2x2 ===
The implementation of 2x2 began in August 1995 on the basis of its own daytime broadcasting schedule. This project envisaged for the distribution of television programs from Moscow via a satellite communications system throughout Russia and the CIS countries, and to areas with a dense Russian-speaking population (the Baltic states, Bulgaria, Israel, and Cyprus). By mid-1996, several stages of this project were successfully completed, which made it possible to switch to broadcasting for 17.5 hours a day, implement strict network programming, and form the basis of the network. The television audience in Russia receiving AST programs was 25 million people (across 214 cities and towns, excluding the Moscow Oblast) and 24 million people in the CIS countries. After the closure of 2x2 in 1997, AST-2x2 remained in operation for some time and broadcast news from TV Centre.

On 4 May 1998, AST-2x2 was replaced by the Gazprom-owned channel Prometey AST, which in 2002 (primarily due to the transfer of the NTV and TNT channels, as well as the satellite operator NTV Plus, to Gazprom-Media) was transformed into ASTV and then completely absorbed by the Rambler Internet portal. In January 2003, the educational channel Rambler TV was created to replace ASTV, whose regional broadcasting network was transferred to the new 2x2 in 2007.

=== Shopping channel (2001–2007) ===
In 2001, the legal entity LLP Company TV Channel 2x2 was renamed to CJSC TV Channel 2x2-Moscow. On 27 February 2002, 2x2 won the competition for channel 43 in Moscow with the concept of a shopping channel. The channel's relaunch was initially scheduled for 11 November 2002, but was postponed when it was discovered that the Ostankino Tower, which distributes central TV channel signals, would only be ready to begin providing services to 2x2 in January 2003. It then turned out that the operation of the 2x2 transmitter on channel 43 was affected by electronic equipment from one of the units of the Russian Ministry of Defense. The relaunch was postponed to 3 January 2003, then later postponed again.

In April 2003, test broadcasts were conducted on channel 44, which showed that it was suitable for broadcasting, but it was launched several years later for broadcasting St. Petersburg's Fifth Channel in Moscow. A month later, in May, members of an interdepartmental working group, made up of representatives of the Ministry of Defense, the Ministry of Communications, and the Russian Television and Radio Broadcasting Network, decided that 2x2 would be allocated channel 60 for broadcasting. On 7 July 2003, the channel began broadcasting on channel 60 in Moscow in an experimental mode. From 1 September of the same year, the channel began full broadcasts. Legally, the new 2x2 was not associated with the old channel that was closed in 1997 - the owner of the new company was ZAO "TV Channel 2x2-Moscow".

In February 2006, 2x2 was acquired by the Profmedia holding company. On 3 October 2006, the new owners presented its updated broadcasting concept.

==== Broadcasting schedule ====
Most of the airtime of the revived 2x2 consisted of FashionTV programs and the channel defined its concept as "television for the active consumer", a kind of television guide to the market of goods and services. According to the prescribed concept, 50% of the new 2x2's broadcasting consisted of retransmission of FashionTV programs and domestic music videos produced by the production studio Trudnoye Detstvo. 2x2's proprietary programs were intended for a youth audience. The channel focused on an audience up to 45 years old with an income above $300, who pay great attention to their lifestyle. In accordance with the concept, the channel fundamentally refused to introduce educational, social, socio-political, or crime programming into its broadcasting schedule.

In 2004, the Style TV channel signed a long-term cooperation agreement with 2x2. That same year, the channel's frequency retransmitted Style TV programs with the 2x2 logo (interrupting the home shopping broadcasts).

By 2005–2006, the channel had reached a critical time: home shopping had almost completely displaced other programs from the broadcast schedule (the channel no longer had a logo, and screensavers indicating the media registration certificate only appeared before music videos). The channel's broadcast schedule mainly included product placement from the TV Club store. Home shopping broadcasts were divided into thematic sections, from kitchen goods to fitness equipment. On Friday nights, the channel broadcast feature films and series. Music videos were also aired.

=== 2007–present ===
2x2 logo from 2007 to 2008

On 1 April 2007, 2x2 underwent its final rebranding, and the channel switched to a new broadcast format. A change in management and staff followed, and the logo and graphic design were changed. The channel began to position itself as "the first Russian animation channel for adults." The channel's broadcast schedule was oriented around the most famous adult animation series. At the start of the rebranding, the broadcast schedule and visual and musical design of the channel were largely based on the American channel Adult Swim.

For the first few months, the rebranded 2x2 was introduced in Saint Petersburg, Moscow, and the Moscow Oblast (including in the Mostelecom package, where 2x2 had been broadcasting since 2005), and in June expansion into other regions began. Broadcasts in most other regions of Russia began in place of the closed educational channel Rambler Teleset.

By the end of 2007, 2x2 began to achieve its first successes — in the first two months of autumn, it managed to increase its audience and overtake channels such as TNT, MTV Russia, and Channel One in youth audience metrics. Later, 2x2 managed to attract an age group that traditionally does not watch TV — young men and "those who have long been disappointed in TV".

In 2008, the legal entity CJSC "TV Channel 2x2-Moscow" was renamed CJSC "TV and Radio Company 2x2". In 2010, it was re-registered as OJSC "TV and Radio Company 2x2".

In early 2009, the 2x2 office moved into the Danilovskiye Manufaktury business center on Varshavskoe Shosse. In July of the same year, after the appearance of Roman Sarkisov as the general director and according to the terms of the license renewal, the channel began to develop a non-animation direction: now it also broadcasts game television series (initially in a special night block 2x2|new). Most of them are satirical or parody shows with their own special, in some sense even absurd, non-standard humor. One of the first purchased TV series was "The Wrong Door" and "Greg Rabbit".

On 14 September 2012, 2x2 began satellite broadcasting with shifts of "+2 MSK " and "+5 MSK".

In February 2014, after Gazprom-Media acquired 100% of the shares in ProfMedia, 2x2, along with the Friday! and TV-3 TV channels, became a part of this media group.

On 1 April 2014, the channel released its own app - «2х2APP».

In March 2015, after a minor reorganization, the channel became part of the Gazprom-Media Entertainment Television (GPM ETV) sub-holding, and its office (as well as those of its sister channels TNT, TV-3, and Friday!) moved to the Diamond Hall business center. In June 2015, former CEO Lev Makarov said that the channel still has an archive from the old 2x2, which was closed in 1997.

On 1 January 2016, the channel ceded part of its broadcast frequencies to TNT4. However, the channel's share did not change significantly, and its coverage remained federal and Russia-wide, since in most large cities it was already retransmitted only on cable networks.

In November 2016, the channel established its own animation studio, with Kirill Danilchenko as its creative producer and Anna Moryakova as its general director. The studio's staff included animators, screenwriters, and voice actors from Serpukhov and Tula who had previously worked on Kit Stupid Show, and it began producing new series in the same style. Among the projects released by the studio are "The Suspicious Owl", "MulTV", "Burdashev" and others. The studio was closed on 25 December 2022.

On 13 April 2017, a 2x2 satellite broadcast began with a shift of "+7 MSK " for residents of the Far East. In the same month, the double "+5 MSK" was replaced with "+4 MSK".

On 10 April 2018, an online broadcast began on the channel's website, which differs from the broadcast version by broadcasting in HD format; it is conducted for the Moscow time zone.

2x2 logo from 2021 to 2023

On 16 August 2021, the channel changed its logo as well as its graphic and interprogram design. The new logo design was proposed by programmer Ivan Tolstokarov from Saratov in the comments of the channel's official VKontakte community.

On 1 October 2023, the 2007–2020 logo was brought back.

==== Broadcast schedule ====
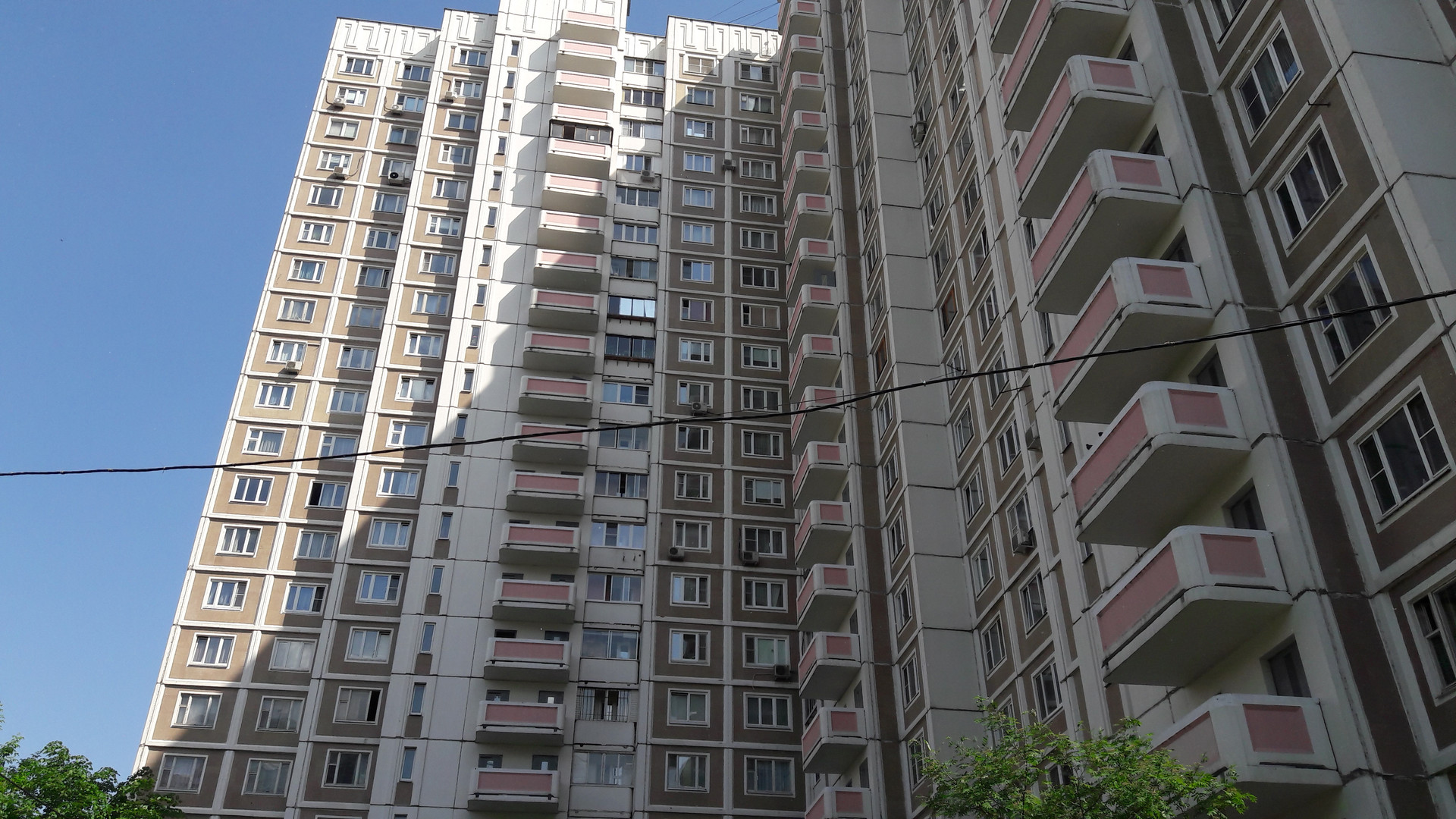
Former 2x2 headquarters (2006–2009)

In March 2007, 2x2 aired fragments of animated series were broadcast on the 2x2 TV channel, after which the air time was shown, as well as a promotional screensaver with the slogan "Turn off your brain, turn on 2x2!" At the bottom was the inscription "channel demo". Periodically, it was replaced by the number of days remaining until the launch of the new channel.

Many of the cartoons that aired on 2x2 had already been shown on other Russian channels, such as The Simpsons, Futurama, Family Guy, and South Park (REN TV); Johnny Bravo and Pinky and the Brain (STS); Drawn Together (TNT); King of the Hill (TV Centre); Beavis and Butt-Head, Daria, Celebrity Deathmatch, Stripperella and Happy Tree Friends (MTV Russia). During the daytime, a family block began to be broadcast, airing series that are mostly intended exclusively for children; at night, the adult block was broadcast instead, airing adult animated series (among them were Robot Chicken, Aqua Teen Hunger Force, 12 oz. Mouse, The Venture Bros., Sealab 2021, Metalocalypse, The Brak Show, and others).

The channel also attracted celebrities to voice series. Thus, translator Dmitry Puchkov took part in dubbing a number of series (South Park, King of the Hill, Popetown, 12 oz. Mouse, Robot Chicken, Tom Goes to the Mayor, and Unsupervised). Journalist Mikhail Kozyrev supervised the dubbing of other animated series. On 21 May 2008, the animated series Monkey Dust premiered, in which the male roles were voiced by journalist Leonid Parfyonov. On 13 April 2009, the animated series The Boondocks was premiered in Russia, with dubbing by rappers Basta and QP.

At the end of 2007, the channel started airing some well-known anime series.

On New Year's Eve 2008, 2x2 aired a concert featuring singer Nikolai Voronov, who became famous on Runet for his song "White Dragonfly of Love". In addition, the New Year's concert featured a performance by cat trainer Vladimir Krasnolozhkin and other artists who had not previously been shown on Russian television.

Since autumn 2010, the channel has been launching its own projects, the first of which were the satirical show Reutov TV from the creative association Pismoshnaya (previously briefly aired on the sister channel MTV Russia) and the original animated series School 13, Pykhchevo and Atomny les. All of the listed projects were cancelled throughout the years for different rerasons, including as a result of 2x2's change in ownership.

On 30 November 2010, it was announced that the channel entered a two-year contract with WWE and would start airing WWE RAW on 5 February 2011. The WWE management also spoke positively about the return of its programming to Russian television.

After the onset of the 2014 Russian financial crisis, it became unprofitable for the new management to commission original animated series, and in November 2014, the channel began airing the online Flash animated series Kit Stupid Show. Its creator, Kirill Dalnichenko (formerly a member of the KVN team "Four Brave" from Serpukhov) had previously collaborated with the channel, having presented it with his other series, FizFak, a year prior. In addition, 2x2 began to base its production on review shows of film, series, and video games: Bessmertnoye kino, Smotryaschy, and Level Up.

In 2016, 2x2 began broadcasting the animated series Rick and Morty, produced by Adult Swim, while purchasing amateur voice-over by YouTuber Dmitry "Syenduk" Karpov.

Since 2017, episodes of the popular YouTube series "Meet Bob" have been broadcast on the channel as inter-programs.

On 6 April 2019, the channel began purchasing recorded Lucha Underground wrestling matches. On 1 November 2019, the "2x2 Media" service was launched (before that, it was called "2x2 Hub"), where for a subscription viewers could watch content in FULL HD and without censorship on the channel's website. There were also projects from Adult Swim that did not get on the air.

In 2020, the "Bazooka Video Store" program used the 2x2 logo of the 2003-2007 model. On 19 October 2020, the channel switched to a 16:9 broadcast format.

In 2022, due to the Russian invasion of Ukraine and the corresponding departure of a number of foreign companies from the Russian market, the channel lost the rights to many popular animated and live-action series, including The Simpsons, Futurama, Avatar: The Last Airbender, Adult Swim shows, and others. They were replaced by Chinese and South Korean dramas and reruns of series from 2x2's sister companies (TV-3 and TNT channels and the Premier streaming service).

== 2x2.Media ==
In February 2020, the 2x2.Media platform was announced. On 8 December 2020, 2x2.Media was launched. The platform explores how pop culture helps people "grow up". 2x2.Media is distinguished by a more original approach to materials: in addition to news, it also publishes longreads, special projects, and curated selections. 2x2.Media explores how animation, TV series, cinema, music, video games, and various forms of contemporary art have influenced and continue to influence Millennials.

== Controversies and criticism ==
As the country's largest adult-oriented animation channel, 2x2 is prone to protest among various conservative and religious groups, and occasionally with authorities. Since 'animation' as a genre was traditionally viewed as exclusively children's media in Russia, 2x2 struggles with continually highlighting that its programs are not recommended for children.

In March 2008, the Russian Media Culture Protection Department (Rossvyazokhrankultura), a regulatory body for TV in Russia, issued a warning to the channel for "promoting the cult of violence and cruelty, causing harm to the health and moral and spiritual development of children and infringing on public morality" due to its broadcasts of the cartoons Happy Tree Friends and The Adventures of Jeffrey, being a violation of its license agreement. The department warned 2x2 to remove them in order to avoid legal issues. The owners of 2x2 voiced their disagreement but reluctantly fulfilled the request. Later that year, activists of the Russian Pentecostal Church criticized 2x2 for airing South Park and The Simpsons. Their appeal to close 2x2 was rejected by the Russian media officials. On September 24, 2008, the channel's license was extended for an additional 5 years.

In July 2009, 2x2 cut a scene from the episode "Free Willzyx" of South Park, because it depicted Vladimir Putin as "a greedy and desperate leader," prompting "criticism and furious discussion on Russia blogs".
