= M-Radio =

Russian Moscow-based radio station

M-Radio (Russian: М-Радио) is a Russian Moscow-based radio station. Their logo is a blue capital M with small, white, feathered wings extending from its sides.

It started broadcasting in 1991 as «M-Radio. New Wave» in Moscow on 71.3 FM. At the moment it broadcasts to Moscow only on 96.4 FM and via Internet. They play a variety of rock music including Kaiser Chiefs, The Killers, Snow Patrol, U2, and many others.

On October 1, 2015, the radio station began broadcasting in a web radio format. Another attempt at reincarnation belongs to the owners of the brand - the holding company of Igor Krutoy and Mikhail Gutseriev, “Krutoy Media”. Since 2025, M-radio has been broadcasting on 94.6 FM at low power on weekends and holidays
