= Rambler TV =

Рамблер ТВ (Rambler TV)
- Country: Russia

Programming
- Language: Russian
- Picture format: 4:3, SDTV

Ownership
- Owner: Rambler Media Group (initially); Prof-Media (October 2006)

History
- Launched: 1 January 2003
- Closed: 10 June 2007

Rambler TV (Russian: Рамблер ТВ) was a private television channel based in Russia which started on January 1, 2003. The channel broadcast a specialty program consisting of documentaries, educational and entertainment programs of mostly western production.

Rambler TV's market share in Russia was very small. In a 2004 survey, only about 5% of respondents said they'd seen Rambler TV in the past week. Rambler TV was ranked 15th among Russian television stations.

Rambler TV was initially part of the Rambler Media Group, which also operates the Rambler web search engine. In October 2006, the channel was sold to the media holding Prof-Media which belongs to Interros, of which the Russian entrepreneur and politician Vladimir Potanin is co-owner.

On June 10, 2007, the station was closed due to low audience ratings.
