= Moscow Television Channel =

Moscow Television Channel Московский телевизионный канал
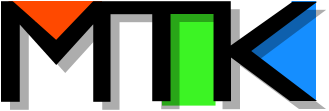
- Country: Russia
- Broadcast area: Moscow; Moscow Oblast; Ryazan; Tver; Lipetsk
- Headquarters: Moscow, Russia

Programming
- Picture format: 4:3 (576i, SDTV)

Ownership
- Owner: JSC RMTRK "Moscow"

History
- Launched: 1 July 1992; 34 years ago
- Replaced: Moscow Programme
- Closed: 8 June 1997; 29 years ago
- Replaced by: TV Center and Moskovia

The Moscow Television Channel (Russian: Московский телевизионный канал, romanized: Moskovskiy televizionnyy kanal) was a Moscow television channel that broadcast on 3 TVK in Moscow and the Moscow Oblast from 27 December 1991, to 8 June 1997, in the evening, daily from 18:00 to 23:00 Moscow time. The editorial offices and studios of the channel were located in the Ostankino television center (ASK-1).

== History ==
On 27 December 1991, with the abolition of the All-Union State Television and Radio Broadcasting Company and the Central Television of the USSR, the Moscow program of the Central Television ceased to exist. MTK (3 TVK) was first transferred to the State Television and Radio Broadcasting Company Ostankino, and from 9 June 1992, to JSC RMTRK Moscow. It broadcast in the evenings every day from 18:00 to 23:00 Moscow time.

== Programming ==
Initially, the weekday program of MTK included the release of the information program Moscow Teletype at 18:45, the information program for the Moscow region Panorama of the Moscow Oblast at 19:00, the program Good Evening, Moscow! at 19:30, the Ostankino News (it was also broadcast on Channel 1 Ostankino at the same time) and the news program Chronicle at 21:35 and the continuation of the program Good Evening, Moscow. On 20 April 1992, another issue of Moscow Teletype was added at 22:50. As part of the MTK broadcast, an hour-long (usually from 18:30 to 19:30) program of Moscow regional television, Podmoskovie, was broadcast every evening, except Sunday. The channel also broadcast concerts of pop performers, and sometimes rock festivals held in Moscow. The broadcast of programs in the morning and afternoon programs was carried out by the 2x2 partnership. The morning-afternoon schedule, which was not subordinate to MTK, included reruns of feature films, cartoons, foreign-produced TV series, music videos, and programs of its own production.

On 30 June 1992, MTK stopped showing Ostankino News. From that moment until 1996, MTK, due to the fact that it ceased to be subordinate to RGTRK Ostankino, also did not broadcast official television programs of synchronous television broadcasting (in the case of this channel, this was only a minute of silence on 9 May; the demonstration of such programs was not carried out, in turn, on the private channel 2x2, which broadcast outside of MTK's working hours). Its simultaneous showing was offered to all-Russian central and decimeter broadcasters as a joint action only after the complete replacement of RGTRK Ostankino with ORT. On 1 July 1992, the channel began showing multi-episode films released in Latin American countries. The first series was the Mexican telenovela "Nobody but You".

On 3 October 1993, the channel ended its broadcasting at 19:38 Moscow Time due to the armed siege of the Ostankino TV and radio company. At that time, the author's program Russian House by Alexander Krutov was shown. After the autumn events of 1993, the broadcast of Russian House on MTK was suspended for some time, but after six months the program was restored to the broadcast schedule.

In 1995, RMTRK "Moscow" bought the rights to show 220 episodes of Dynasty with Heather Locklear from Fox. There were many who wanted to make a deal with Fox. In particular, MNVK TV-6 really wanted to show the series on its network, and at the final stage of negotiations, the newly formed JSC ORT was fighting to purchase the rights to show the series.

From 11 January to 7 June 1997, MTK aired the game show One Hundred to One, which had previously been shown on the NTV channel and later moved to the TV Center channel.

== Closure ==
On the evening of 8 June 1997, MTK stopped broadcasting along with the 2x2 channel. The following day, joint broadcasting of the Moskovia and TV Center channels began. Some of the programs produced by RMTRK Moskva itself or by its order continued to be broadcast on TV Center, and the programs of the 2x2 channel were moved to a separate decimeter channel. Some of the programs that were broadcast on MTK were subsequently broadcast on other Moscow channels: Moskovia, Channel 31, Stolitsa, and Teleexpo.

In the last two years, the channel's popularity has been steadily declining: according to Russian Research and other research organizations, the number of viewers watching MTK has fallen almost tenfold over the specified period. The quality of broadcasting and the programs shown also did not correspond to the level of contemporary Russian television at that time; one of the officials of the Moscow government of those years perceived “MTK” as “a pre-perestroika channel, which was one continuous commercial break minus the endless TV series”.
