= Programme One =

Television channel of SCTV

- Country: Soviet Union
- Broadcast area: Nationwide
- Network: Central Television USSR

Programming
- Language: Russian
- Picture format: SECAM (576i 4:3 SDTV)
- Timeshift service: Based on Orbita system

Ownership
- Owner: State Committee of Television and Radio Broadcasting (1951—1991); All-Union State Television and Radio Broadcasting Company (1991)
- Sister channels: Programme Two; Moscow Programme; Programme Four; Programme Six

History
- Founded: 22 March 1951; 75 years ago
- Launched: 22 March 1951; 75 years ago
- Closed: 27 December 1991; 34 years ago
- Replaced by: 1st channel Ostankino (Note: later Public Russian Television (ORT), and now Channel One Russia)
- Former names: 1951—1956: Soviet Central Television Studio

Programme One (Russian: 1-я программа Центрального телевидения, romanized: Pervaya programma Tsentral'nogo televideniya) known also as CT-1 (Russian: ЦТ-1, romanized: TsT-1) was a television channel produced and transmitted by Soviet Central Television, the television broadcasting organization of the USSR. It had a mixed schedule of news and entertainment, with the emphasis on events in the USSR, and also included regional programming.

== History ==
Programme One was established on 22 March 1951 when, as part of a reorganization of the television system, the Moscow Television Station changed its name to reflect its planned expansion. It was known officially as the CT USSR Programme One (Russian: Первая программа ЦТ СССР).

Since 1931 the Moscow Department of Television of the State Committee of Television and Radio Broadcasting of the Soviet Union broadcast on medium waves, which was stopped in 1941. Since 1939 the Moscow Television Center (MTC) began broadcasting on ultra-short waves.

=== 1951–1967 ===
On 22 March 1951, the Central Television Studio (CST) was created to prepare and produce its own programs, as well as to order the production of television films and television plays (previously only newsreels, feature films and documentaries were broadcast). MTC was left only with the technical part of preparing programs and distributing programs via radio waves in Moscow and the Moscow Oblast, and it itself was transferred to the Soviet Ministry of Communications, but in 1960 it was returned to the USSR State Television and Radio Broadcasting Company. Since 1 January 1955, CST has been broadcasting daily in the evenings. On 14 February 1956, after the start of the two-program television broadcasting, the Central Television Studio began to be considered its First Program.

In 1956, the program "Latest News" began to be broadcast, from July 1956 - twice a day, in 1960 it became known as "News". Since 1956, the studio began to broadcast live various events (the first such broadcast was the parade and festive demonstration on Red Square in Moscow on 1 May 1956). In 1962, a report was transmitted from the spacecraft Vostok-3 and Vostok-4, which marked the beginning of space television.

During this period, a number of programs appeared that became the flagships of Russian television for many years: "Health" (since 1960), "Travelers' Club" (since 1960), "KVN" (since 1961), "Blue Light" (since 1962), "Kinopanorama" (since 1962), "Music Kiosk" (since 1962), "Rural Hour" (since 1963), "Alarm Clock" (since 1965), "13 Chairs Tavern" (since 1966), and others. In the 1960s, television feature films began to be released (before this, only films that were originally shown in cinemas were shown on TV). At first, television films were single-part, but then multi-part ones appeared. The first multi-part television film was the 4-part “We Call Fire on Ourselves” (1965).

=== 1967–1985 ===
Since 2 November 1967, the program's broadcasting covered the entire territory of the country via the Orbita television satellite network; at the same time, an independent Orbita program began broadcasting in Siberia, the Russian Far East, and in a number of regions of Kazakhstan and Central Asia, formed from the broadcasts of the First Program of Central Television.

In the same 1967, Central Television was given a new studio and broadcasting complex in the Ostankino Technical Center, which had 10 studio and broadcasting units, 4 telecinema studio and broadcasting units, and several video recording units. The appearance of a large number of ASCs led to the emergence of many new thematic programs - "I Serve the Soviet Union!" (since 1967), "In the Animal World" (since 1968), "International Panorama" (since 1969), "Man and the Law" (since 1970), "From the Bottom of the Heart" (since 1971), "Song of the Year" (since 1971), "The Obvious - the Incredible" (since 1973), "Studio 9" (since 1974), "Morning Mail" (since 1974), "ABVGDeyka" (since 1975), "What? Where? When?" (since 1975), "Visiting a Fairy Tale" (since 1976), "Around Laughter" (since 1978), "Until 16 and Over..." (since 1983).

In 1968, instead of the Film Production Department at the Central Television, a self-supporting state institution, the Creative Association Ekran, was established, which produced and ordered the production of television films from other film and television studios. The emergence of 4 ASC telekino led to an increase in the number of its own television films produced by TO Ekran (Shadows Disappear at Noon, Seventeen Moments of Spring, Eternal Call, Investigation Led by ZnaToKi, Born of the Revolution, TASS is Authorized to Declare, and others), as well as to the beginning of the release of children's and animated television films. The spread of reportage installations led to the appearance in 1968 of a large information program called Vremya, as well as new thematic programs and an increase in the release of television films. The appearance of several video recording machines led to a significant reduction in live broadcasts, which were limited to broadcasts of the announcer's text, as well as broadcasts of individual events and sports competitions. The Moscow Television Center (MTC) itself became the All-Union Television Center (OTC) (later it was called the "Television Technical Center named after the 50th Anniversary of October"), its transmitting part was subordinated to the Ministry of Communications and became the All-Union Radio and Television Transmitting Station.

On 25 January 1971, the USSR State Television and Radio Broadcasting Company launched a duplicate of the "First Program of Central Television" via the "Orbita" system - the "East" program: it was intended for the Urals, Central Asia and part of Kazakhstan and took into account the difference in time zones (+2 hours from Moscow time). Since 1 January 1976, Central Television launched three more duplicates of the "First Program of Central Television" (the "Orbita-1, -2, -3" programs) specifically for the eastern territories of the USSR with a time shift of +8, +6 and +4 hours. In 1984, the broadcast coverage of the "First Program of Central Television" reached 92% of the population of the USSR. The channel, which was transmitted on the SECAM D/K standard, carried advertising for the first time in the 1980s.

=== 1985–1991 ===
In the second half of the 1980s, live television programs began to appear again - "12th Floor" (in 1985-1987). In the same year, "Vzglyad" (1987-1991), "Press Club", etc.). At the same time, the information service began to change - in 1986, the morning information program "60 Minutes" appeared, in 1987 it was renamed "90 Minutes", and later "120 Minutes", and later "Morning", in 1989, the information program "Television News Service" was created, which was broadcast daily late in the evening, the hosts of which were the hosts of the program "120 Minutes", the information and analytical program "7 Days" (the following year its broadcast was stopped), the hosts of which were Eduard Sagalaev and Alexander Tikhomirov. In 1988, the Foreign Trade Association "Sovteleexport" was created to sell programs to other television organizations and purchase TV programs from them, and the firm "Sovtelevideo" was created to exchange programs with them. The Italian advertising agency Pubitalia-80 received the right to place the advertisement “Progress, information, advertising”, produced by the Main Editorial Board of Popular Science and Educational Programs of the Soviet Central Television, and with its support the TV quiz show “Schastlivy Sluch” appeared on the Central Television. Also, the Main Directorate of Programs of the Central Television was reorganized into the General Directorate of Programs of the Central Television, and the “Ekran” TO into the TPO “Soyuztelefilm”.

Some of the employees of the Main Editorial Board of Programs for Youth of the Central Television established the television company VID and ATV, for the purchase of programs from which, instead of the editorial board itself, the studio "Experiment" and "New Studio" were created, respectively, which received the status of a legal entity and the right to place advertising within the programs, which was transferred to the television company VID and ATV in exchange for the prepared programs, somewhat later the status of legal entities was received by the Main Editorial Board of Information of the Central Television and the Main Editorial Board of Television Programs for Moscow and the Moscow Region, reorganized respectively into the Studio of Information Programs (on 1 November of the same year it was liquidated and in its place the Information Television Agency was created) and the Studio of Moscow Programs. Among other things, the VID television company began to prepare the quiz show “Field of Miracles” (an unlicensed analogue of the American game show “Wheel of Fortune”), which soon became one of the most popular programs.

On 8 February 1991, the All-Union State Television and Radio Broadcasting Company was created instead of the State Committee of Television and Radio Broadcasting of the Soviet Union. It combined the rights of a state body and a state enterprise, the chairman of which was to be appointed by the President of the USSR (Leonid Kravchenko became this position), the programs “TSN”, “Vzglyad”, “Press Club”, “Do i posle Polunochi” were closed, but on 27 August he was relieved of his post, Yegor Yakovlev was appointed the new chairman of the All-Union GTRK, and Eduard Sagalayev was appointed first deputy chairman and general director, after which the staff of the “Television News Service” program returned to the All-Union GTRK, and the broadcast of the programs “Vzglyad”, “Press Club”, “Do i posle Polunochi” was resumed.

During the attempt at state coup by order of the self-proclaimed State Emergency Committee, all TV channels of the All-Union State Television and Radio Broadcasting Company refused their usual broadcast schedule, replacing all programs (except for news) with a showing of Pyotr Ilyich Tchaikovsky's ballet Swan Lake.

On 27 August 1991, Yegor Yakovlev was appointed the new chairman of the All-Union State Television and Radio Broadcasting Company, and Eduard Sagalaev was appointed first deputy chairman and general director. The staff of the "Television News Service" program returned to the Central Television Channel One (Russian: Первый канал ЦТ)., on its basis a new information service of the channel was created (it was named the Information Television Agency, Boris Nepomnyashchy, previously senior editor of the "Vremya" program, was appointed director, Oleg Dobrodeev was appointed editor-in-chief), which included part of the news staff of the All-Union State Television and Radio Broadcasting Company.

=== Termination of broadcasting ===
The Decree of the President of Russia of 27 December ordered the liquidation of the All-Union State Television and Radio Broadcasting Company and the creation on its basis of the Russian State Television and Radio Broadcasting Company Ostankino, the chairman of the All-Union State Television and Radio Broadcasting Company E. V. Yakovlev was appointed its chairman. In January-March 1992, instead of the General Directorate of Programs of the Soviet Central Television, thematic studios, creative associations and main editorial offices of the Central Television, the Directorate of Programs of the Ostankino Television Company, thematic studios and creative associations of the RGTRK Ostankino were created. Ostankino Television Channel One was created. However, in the printed summary of the program schedules up until February, the name of the television channel used from 16 May 1957 to 15 September 1991 was indicated.

Following the dissolution of the USSR, Programme One's frequencies were transferred to the new state broadcasting organizations in the former Soviet republics, while in the Russian republic the main Ostankino Television channel took over its signal and transmitters.

== Programming ==
The periodic Little Blue Light became a staple of Soviet Union celebrations during New Year's Eve, International Women's Day, and International Workers' Day. The programme continues to run today on Russia 1.

The news department did not employ news journalists until 1989, when they began to front the shorter bulletins (the main 18:30 and 21:00 news programmes was fronted only by senior journalists until after the failed coup d'etat).

== See also ==
- Eastern Bloc information dissemination
- CCTV 1 - similar channel in China
