= Moscow Programme =

Television channel of SCTV

Moscow Programme Московская программа ЦТ
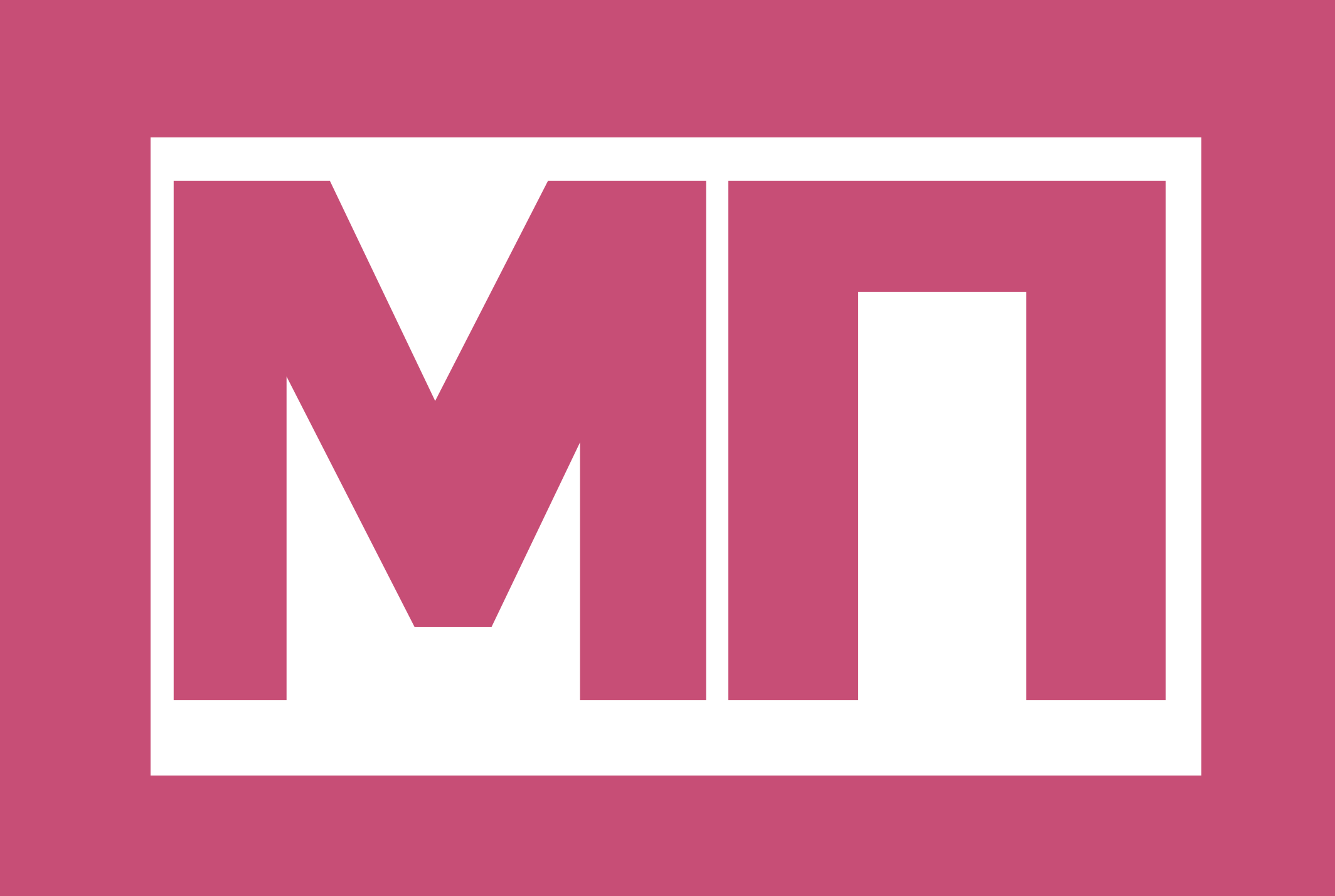
- Country: Soviet Union
- Broadcast area: Gosteleradio (1965—1991); All-Union GTRK (1991)
- Network: Central Television USSR

Programming
- Language: Russian

Ownership
- Sister channels: Programme One; Programme Two; Programme Four; Programme Six

History
- Launched: 29 March 1965; 60 years ago
- Closed: 30 June 1992; 33 years ago
- Replaced by: 2x2 MTK
- Former names: 1965—1981: Third (Educational) Programme

The Moscow Programme (Московская программа ЦТ, Moskovskaya programma TsT) was a Soviet Central Television channel in the Soviet Union. It served viewers in Moscow, the Moscow Oblast, and nearby regions. The same frequency now has a television station broadcast by the Moscow City Government named TV Centre.

== History ==
The channel began broadcasting in September 1964 as Programme Three, with a focus on educational programming for students of various ages. The channel included programs on popular science and mathematics.

In 1982 Programme Three was renamed Moscow Programme, following Programme 2's upgrading as a national channel. Moscow-centric programming, previously aired on Programme 2 was transferred to Programme 3.

When the Soviet Union dissolved in December 1991, the Moscow Television Channel (Московский телевизионный канал, MTK) took over operations of this channel. It aired programmes from 2x2 in the evening. This channel was replaced by TV Centre in 1997.

== See also ==
- Eastern Bloc information dissemination
