= ATV (Russia) =

Private television company, founded in 1988

ATV Author Television
- Type: Closed Joint-Stock Company (1993-2014); Limited Liability Company (c.2014)
- Country: Soviet Union (1988-1991) Russia (c.1991)
- Founded: 15 September 1988; 38 years ago by Anatoly Malkin and Kira Proshutinskaya
- Broadcast area: National
- Official website: www.atv.ru

ATV (Author Television) is the oldest Russian private TV company. It was founded in the USSR on 15 September 1988 by Anatoly Malkin and Kira Proshutinskaya. It reached its height in popularity in Russia in the 1990s.

The television company was founded on 15 September 1988 with the support of the cooperative of the architect Yuri Makarov (a story about him was previously filmed in the program "Peace and Youth", where Kira Proshutinskaya worked). The name ATV was coined by Anatoly Malkin. He deciphered the name as "alternative television", but Malkin's friend and colleague Vladimir Voroshilov suggested the "author's television" option, since in his opinion, the "alternative" decoding was inappropriate.

For the first three years, ATV produced projects within the framework of the Main Edition of Programs for Youth, from which Malkin and Proshutinskaya came out. The first program of the TV company was the "Press Club" talk show, which aired in September 1989. The first documentary film "Circle", which told the story of the Komsomol. Also in 1988-1990 ATV made stories for the program "Vzglyad".

In the period from 1990 to 1992, the Programme One of the Soviet Central Television (later on the 1st channel Ostankino) on Monday evenings aired the channel "Author's Television", which was a block of programs of ATV's own production. From November 1991 to 1996, the company was the founder and partner of the creative association "New Studio" of the RGTRK "Ostankino". In addition, the studio produced a weekly TV block called "New Studio Presents" for 1st Channel Ostankino. In September 1992, ATV became the main contractor for 4th Channel Ostankino, which was placed under the authority of New Studio. From 1994 to 1995, together with the television companies VID and REN-TV, it was a member of the Association of Independent Television Producers, which became the founder of ORT.

The television company has repeatedly tried to create its own channel in the late 1990s and early 2000s, it often took part in television competitions for frequencies. In 2000, ATV applied for broadcasting for 3 TVKs in Moscow together with VID TV company. But neither VID nor ATV passed, and the place was given to the operating company TVC. In 2004 the company, together with ZAO Stream-TV, created the Retro-TV channel, one of the owners of which it remained until 2007. In 2000, during a fire at the Ostankino TV tower, the ORT channel was broadcast on ATV.

In 2004-2005, ATV was also engaged in the release of audiobooks.

In 2007, the Quadriga Capital private equity fund bought out a controlling stake from the founders of the studio (Kira Proshutinskaya and Anatoly Malkin) for an estimated $25 million.

In 2008, ATV received a license for satellite broadcasting and together with ZAO AKADO Stolitsa, created the PRO Money TV channel.

From 2009 to 2012 on the basis of "ATV" the television production company "Proma Production", produced programs such as "What to do?", "Surname" ("Big family"), "Earlier than all", "Salt ", "Tea Party ", "Natural Science. Lectures and Experiments ", "Theatrical Fa-Sol ", "Wife", "Fa-Sol. Workshop ”, “Homework Rescue Service”. After the divorce of the founder Kira Proshutinskaya from Anatoly Malkin, the TV company was closed. ATV simultaneously with Proshutinskaya leaves a number of employees. From 2012 to 2014, the TV company's products were produced under the name MAG-TV (based on the first letters of the surname, name and patronymic of the founder of the TV company).

Since September 2016, ATV projects have been published under the copyright "IP Malkin Anatoly Grigorievich", since October 2018 "IP Lezhanskaya Kristina Yuryevna", and since September 2020 - as LLC "Novoe ATV".
