= NIIR =

Russian research institute

Coordinates: 55°45′45″N 37°39′52″E

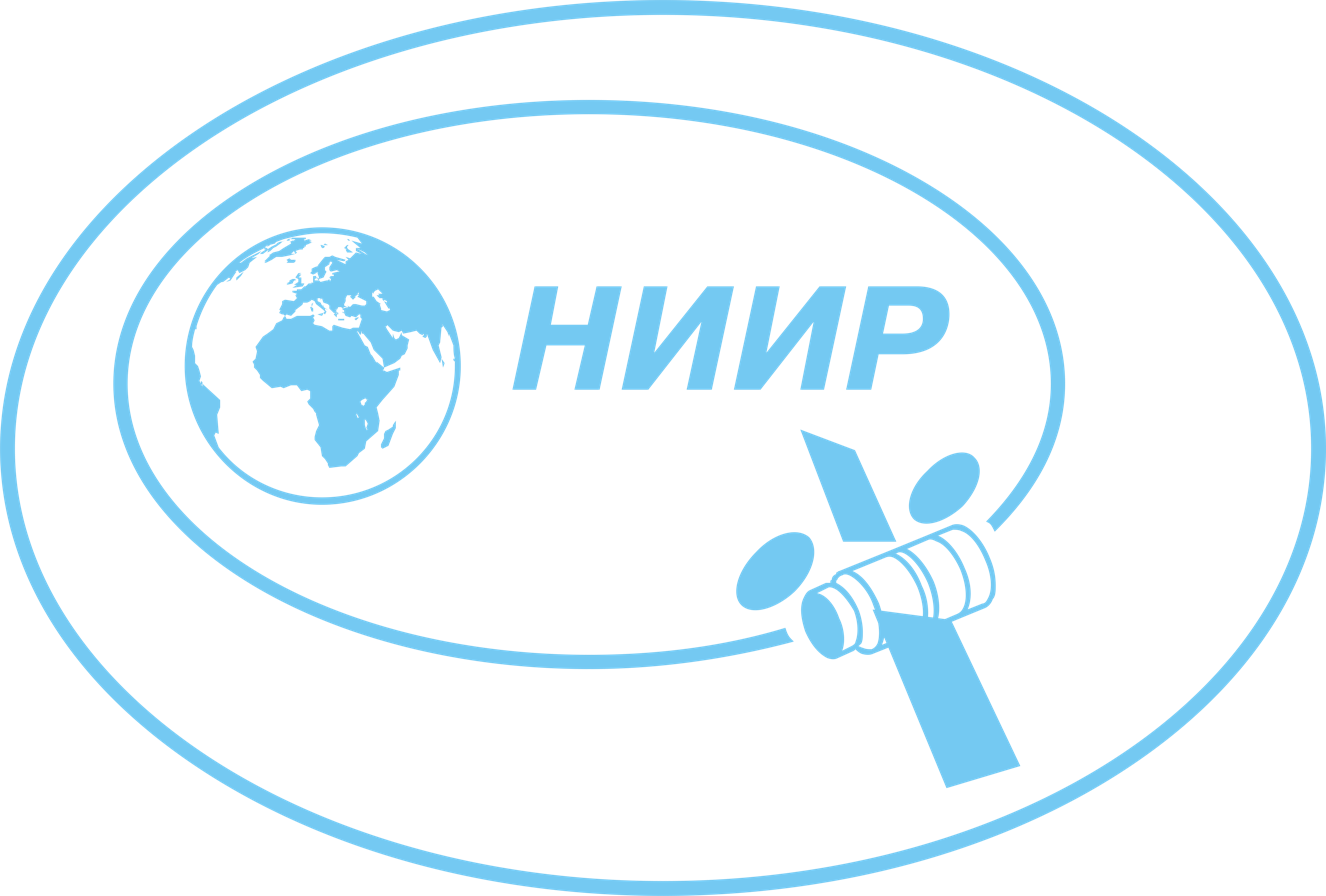
- Type: Federal State Budgetary Institution
- Industry: Research activities
- Founded: 7 September 1949
- Headquarters: Moscow, Russia
- Products: Radios, communication equipment
- Owner: Russian Ministry of Communications
- Website: www.niir.ru

FSBI NII Radio or NIIR (Russian: ФГБУ НИИ Радио, НИИР) is a Russian Scientific-Research Institute created in 1949 by a decree of the Soviet Government. In 2024 was renamed Federal Research Center of Tellecomunications (NITS Telecom)

== History ==
On September 7, 1949, in Moscow, on the initiative of the Minister of Communications of the Soviet Union, Nikolay Psurtsev, by a government decree issued by the Council of Ministers of the Soviet Union, an independent NII-100 was created on the basis of the radio department of the Central Scientific Research Institute of Communications and facility No. 100 - the State Scientific Research Institute for Radio Broadcasting, Radio Communications and Radiofication, subordinated directly to the Ministry of Communications. In 1964, by a decree of the Council of Ministers of the Soviet Union, NII-100 was renamed the "State Scientific Research Institute of Radio". The institute created a number of scientific schools, the main areas of activity in the Soviet period were the creation of radio relay (RRL) and satellite communication and broadcasting systems, mainly for civilian purposes

In the early 1950s, by decision of the Soviet Ministry of Communications, the Institute was tasked with creating equipment for broadband radio relay lines (RRL) for civil communications in order to distribute sound and television broadcasting throughout the USSR. Given the level of radio engineering at that time, this was a complex task. In 1966, the NIIR organized a department of radio relay systems, headed by N. N. Kamensky.

The first head of NII-100 was the prominent Soviet engineer A. V. Cherenkov, who later headed the Ministry of Communications of the RSFSR. His name is associated with the establishment of NIIR as the country's leading scientific organization in the field of radio communications and broadcasting. He was succeeded by Vladimir Siforov (1953-1957) was a famous Soviet scientist, Corresponding Member of the Soviet Academy of Sciences, and professor. During this period, the institute developed the first radio relay communication system, improved shortwave communication technology, and began to create the country's first frequency plans for sound and television broadcasting networks. Siforov was succeeded by Aleksandr Fortushenko (1957-1976) was a doctor of technical sciences, professor, Honored Scientist and Engineer of the USSR, and laureate of the USSR State Prizes. The period of his leadership was marked by the most rapid development; the institute's subject matter and staff expanded significantly. The institute was involved in laying the foundations for the construction of domestic trunk radio relay, tropospheric, and satellite communications, based on which satellite communications, television, and sound broadcasting networks were created in the USSR and a number of other countries.

In 1976, the institute was headed by Vladimir Pavlovich Minashin, a candidate of technical sciences, an honored communications specialist of the RSFSR, and a Lenin Prize laureate. In 1992, Professor Yuri Borisovich Zubarev, a corresponding member of the Russian Academy of Sciences, became the general director of NIIR.

== Description ==
It is currently an institute of the Russian Ministry of Informational Technologies and Communications, and performs work constructing radiocommunication systems in satellite and terrestrial TV and radio broadcasting, and the pursuit of further development of radio technologies. The NIIR is located at 105064, 16 Kazakova str., Moscow.

== See also ==
- Phazotron-NIIR
- ELEMASH Machine-Building Plant
