= TV Centre (Russia) =

Public TV channel based in Moscow

Center TV ТВ Центр
- Country: Russia
- Broadcast area: Russia

Programming
- Picture format: 16:9 (576i, SDTV)

Ownership
- Owner: Government of Moscow

History
- Launched: 1989 (as 2x2); 1997 (as TVC)
- Replaced: 2x2, MTK
- Former names: 2x2 (original) (1989-1997)

Links
- Website: http://www.tvc.ru

Availability

Terrestrial
- Digital terrestrial television: Channel 10

Center TV (Russian: ТВ Центр, romanized: TV Tsentr; formerly abbreviated as ТВЦTVC or ТВЦ-Москва, TVC-Moskva - "TVC Moscow") is a Russian public television station with the Fifth largest coverage area in Russia, after 5TV, Channel One, Russia-1 and NTV. It is owned by the administration of the city of Moscow and is dedicated to programming that highlights various aspects of Moscow life. The channel airs across Russian territory.

The channel began broadcasting on June 9, 1997. Yulia Bystritskaya has been the channel's general director since October 29, 2012.

As of 2020, Center TV was among the top ten TV channels in Russia. The channel had an average daily audience share of 361 000 viewers.

On June 3, 2022, the international version of Center TV was disconnected from broadcasting in the European Union due to the Russian invasion of Ukraine.

== History ==
=== 1997–2012 ===
On January 15, 1997, the Moscow Government established the OJSC "TV Centre". While the Moskomimushchestvo and OJSC "Moscow Committee of Science and Technology" were the channel's organizational founders, the Moscow Government held its controlling ownership interest, owning 67% of the channel's shares.

On June 9, 1997, TV Centre began broadcasting from the Ostankino Tower on the basis of the two channels, 2x2 and Moscow Television Channel. Together with Moscovia TV channel, TV Centre was broadcasting on the same frequency. In the first two years of broadcasting, along with the cable channel TV Centre-Stolitsa and satellite channel Meteor, the channel operated as a part of "TV Centre" broadcasting consortium of terrestrial, cable, and satellite television.

Boris Vishnyak was appointed as the TV Centre's general director, Stanislav Arkhipov became the channel's producer. Sergey Cheskidov headed the editorial board of sports programs.

The channel first broadcast only in Moscow, Moscow Region, and Ryazan. In January 1998, TV Centre started broadcasting in Saint Petersburg as well. A year later, in 1999, the channel was present in 36 out of 89 Russian regions, thus covering around 33% of the Russian territory.

In 1998, the channel began the construction of its own building. The office's erection was completed in 2003.

On September 6, 1999, the channel changed its logo and abbreviated its name to TVC. The changes took place due to a new management team headed by Konstantin Likutov. Under his direction, in 1999–2000, the channel's ratings were almost equal to those of its competitors. Furthermore, the ratings of TV Centre's news program Sobytya (Events) sometimes outnumbered rates of some informational programs of bigger channels, including, for instance, the Vesti news.

In February 2000, Oleg Poptsov was elected president of TVC. On May 20, 2000, the channel's broadcast license expired. As a result, TVC was broadcasting with a temporary permit. At the same time, Russian Minister of Press and Mass Media, Mikhail Lesin, announced a tender for TVC's TV frequencies, which the channel eventually won. The license was prolonged for another 5 years, until the spring of 2005.

In September 2001, Pavel Kasparov was appointed the channel's general director (he held this position until 2004). Under his leadership, TVC introduced an original color scheme. The channel's main color changed four times during the day at 6am, 11am, 6pm, and 12am. In the morning all backgrounds and studios were colored in yellow, in the afternoon the channel's theme was green, in the evening it switched to blue, and at night - red. In such a manner, as the channel's designers reported, 24 hours of TVC's broadcasting were compared with a full day cycle.

On January 1, 2003, TVC launched a subsidiary channel, "Moscow - Open World". It was stated that the new channel was served as an unofficial intermediary for transmitting TVC's programs to Russian expatriate, residing in Europe, Asia, and North Africa.

In 2005, the channel opened its official international branch - TVCI (TV Center International) - that broadcast TVC's programs worldwide. On December of the same year, TVC Board of Directors removed Poptsov from his post of the channel's president and assigned Alexander Ponomarev as general director. The former linked the dismissal to his documentary about president Vladimir Putin, which had been previously aired on TVC. By the time Oleg Poptsov had to step down, TVC was referred to as a "channel of Moscow pensioners" as the majority of its regular audience were people aged over 55 years. Hence, Alexander Ponomarev's team worked on attracting middle-aged viewers living in Russian regions. To achieve this goal, in August 2006, the channel returned to its original name ("TV Centre") and updated its logo and design. Furthermore, TV Centre switched to 24-hour broadcasting.

=== 2012–2022 ===
On October 24, 2012, Yulia Bystritskaya (née Rakcheyeva) - previously the vice general director of VGTRK, became TV Centre's general directors of Alexander Ponomaryov. On December 14 of the same year, the channel was included in the second multiplex of digital terrestrial television.

On April 20, 2013, TV Centre became a federal TV channel by a presidential decree and was included in the first multiplex of digital television. As a result, a month later, the channel began broadcasting as a part of the first multiplex in several Russian regions (namely, the Tyumen and Altai regions), where this system was available by that time. On December 31, 2014, TV Centre terminate the contract with the regional partners in order to organize a unified system of TV broadcasting.

In April 2015, the channel switched to 16:9 widescreen broadcasting.

In 2016, TV Centre opened its new branch - "Central Television" - to air the channel's selected entertainment and journalistic programs.

In June 2017, the channel announced that it would switch to high-definition broadcasting. The switch happened three years later, in February 2020, and Rostelecom was the digital provider to transmit TV Centre in an HD quality.

In December 2021, the Russian government allocated 7, 954 billion rubles to pay for distribution of state-owned TV channels in towns with a population of less than 100,000 people. Thus, the funding was provided to Channel One, NTV, Saint Petersburg TV and Radio Company, Karusel, TV Centre, and Match TV. In the same month, TV Centre received a governmental subsidy for the organization of close captioning.

On June 3, 2022, the international version of TV Centre was disconnected from broadcasting in Europe due to the Russian aggression in Ukraine.

== Criticism ==
In 2017, Russian TV journalist Vladimir Kara-Murza Sr. wrote in one of his articles that he considers TV Center to be the weakest channel, calling it provincial. He argued this by the lack of a concept: after the “major” federal news, they could show a “everyday” local story; on different days, documentaries and programs broadcasting opposing opinions could also coexist on the air. He also criticized the design of the channel and the presence of presenters in the staff, "...whose time has already passed".

In the 2000s, under the leadership of Oleg Poptsov, the channel was also often criticized for its inconsistency with the realities of modern television broadcasting and for oversaturating the broadcast network with a large number of outdated TV programs.

== Logo history ==
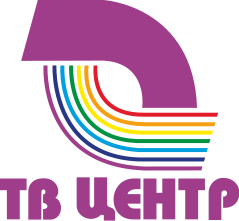
1997-1999

1999-2000

2000-2001

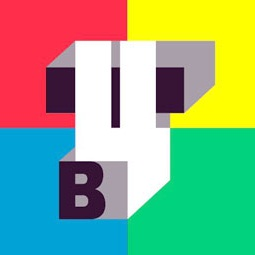
2001-2005

2005-2006

2006-2011

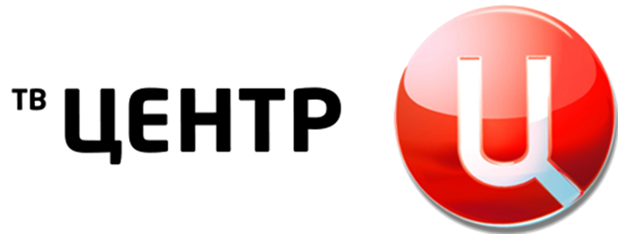
2011-2013

2013–present

== Programming ==
=== Information-analytical ===
- Sobytiya: News programme (1997–present).
- Petrovka, 38: Crime news (1997–present).
- Postscriptum: Weekly author information and analytical program hosted by Alexei Pushkov (1998–present).
- Town meeting: (1999–present).
- Sobytiya. 25th Hour: Nightly news programme (2000–present).
- Moskovskaya nedelya: Weekly news telemagazine (2000–present).
- V centre sobytiy: Weekly analytical program (2006–present).
- News City: (2012–present).

=== Publicistic ===
- Invites Boris Notkin: Weekly program interview (1997-2015).
- Documentaries of Leonid Mlechin: Weekly documentary program of Leonid Mlechin (1998-2014).
- Pravoslavnaya encyclopedia: Religious encyclopedic information program about Eastern Orthodox (2002–present).
- March-Brosok: Telemagazine of the life of the modern Russian army (2003–present).
- Line of Defense: TV magazine legal issues (2007–present).
- Secrets of our cinema: Programme of Soviet cinema (2011–present).
- The Russian Question: Konstantin Zatulin program about the fate of the Russian people (2012–present).
- Beware, crooks!: Program scams, their victims and ways to combat scams (2013–present).

=== Talk show ===
- Temporarily available: Weekly night program interviews with two leading (2008-2015).
- Missis: (2011–present).
- Brainstorming: Weekly program devoted to science and high technology (2012–present).
- Pravo golosa (Vote): daily political talk show (2012–present).
- Dr. I. ..: Program on health (2013–present).
- Right to know: Socio-political talk show. The flagship project of the channel, which faced a different perspective on the most pressing question of the week. Protagonist ask questions editors of leading Russian mass media (2014–present).

=== Educational ===
- Life factor: Information TV magazine devoted to the problems of people with disabilities (2007–present).
- Lady and the chef: Culinary program (2010–present).

=== Entertainment ===
- Nastroyeniye: Morning feed (1997–present).
- Talents and Admirers: (2007–present).
- Laughter for home delivery: Humorous program (2008–present).
- Shelter comedians: Acting evening (2011–present).
- Hurry to see!: Program of cultural events (2013–present).

=== Children's ===
- ABVGDeyka: Educational program for preschool and primary school children passing through play (2000–2020).

=== Sports ===
- Football Center: Weekly football review (2011-2015)

=== Archive ===
==== Information-analytical ====
- Business Moscow: Economic programme (1997-2012, earlier 2x2).
- Seventh Day: Analytical program (1997-1999).
