= Ekran =

Soviet-Russian type of geostationary satellite

For the Soviet animation studio see page Studio Ekran

Ekran (Russian: "Экран", meaning "Screen") was a Soviet-Russian type of geostationary satellite, developed for a national system of Direct-To-Home television. The first satellite of Ekran series was launched on 26 October 1976. Each satellite in the Ekran series was designed to provide one TV and two radio program channels to cable TV systems throughout the USSR and to individual home receivers in northern Siberia. Ekran's downlink is in the Ultra high frequency (UHF) range.

Early Ekran satellites used orbital positions in the range from 48° East to 95° East, but recent Ekran, including the current Ekran 20, have been stationed at 99° East. These 3-axis stabilized satellites carry a single 24 MHz, 200 watts transponder, feeding a 28 dB gain antenna transmitting on right-hand circular polarization to produce in Siberia in the range 50 to 55 dBW at 714 MHz. The corresponding feeder link uses left-hand circular polarization at 6200 MHz. Therefore, almost every householder could receive the TV signal at home from Ekran's transponder using a simple Yagi–Uda antenna. There were also various kinds of collective or individual satellite receivers, such as Ekran-KR10 and Ekran-KR01. Latest version of the receiver represents a simple individual TV set-top box itself. A modified version of Ekran was called Ekran-M. Ekran satellites have been replaced by improved geostationary craft for DBS, such as Gorizont, Gals, and Ekspress.

On 23 June 1978, the Ekran-2 (International Designator 1977-092A) spacecraft exploded due to a catastrophic discharge of its battery, contributing to the increase in space debris in the Geostationary orbit. 8 pieces of known debris originating from Ekran-2 have been confirmed. Also, the Ekran-9 (International Designator 1982-093A) spacecraft exploded on December 1983. On 1 February 2009, the last satellite from the Ekran series, Ekran-M at 99° East, stopped transmitting.
