= Programme Two =

Television channel of SCTV

- Country: Soviet Union
- Broadcast area: National
- Network: Soviet Central Television
- Headquarters: Moscow

Programming
- Picture format: SECAM (576i 4:3 SDTV)

Ownership
- Owner: State Committee of Television and Radio Broadcasting (1956—1991); All-Union State Television and Radio Broadcasting Company (1991)
- Sister channels: Programme One; Moscow Programme; Programme Four; Programme Six

History
- Launched: 14 February 1956; 69 years ago
- Closed: 27 December 1991; 33 years ago
- Replaced by: Russia-1 (in Russia)
- Former names: 1956—1981: Second (Moscow) Programme

Programme Two (Russian: Вторая программа ЦТ, Vtoraya programma TsT) was one of the channels of Soviet Central Television between 1956 and 1991. Its programmes was mostly entertainment, cultural, news and sport programming. It was also known as the All-Union Program due to its national reach across the Soviet Union and the fact that even programs of all forms from the various Union republics were also broadcast here. It is now known as Russia-1.

== History ==
Programme Two began services in 14 February 1956 for Moscow and surrounding regions. as «Вторая (московская) программа ЦСТ» (Second (Moscow) Programme of the Central Television Studio). From 17 May 1957, the name became simply Central Television Second Programme or Programme Two (Russian: Вторая программа ЦТ. It became a nationwide network in 1982, while Moscow-centric programmes were moved to Programme Three. It broadcast centralized entertainment produced in Moscow and the various Soviet republics via the republican television stations.

On January 1, 1982, the Fourth Program of CT was transferred to the Second Program of CT. Thus, the Second Program of CT changed its status from regional to national and began broadcasting throughout the Soviet Union. As part of acquiring the all-Union status, the USSR State Television and Radio Broadcasting Company organized the broadcasting of the Second Program of CT on four air duplicates for the eastern territories (Dubl-1, -2, -3, -4) and regional windows for local television programs. As for the programs for the Moscow viewer, they were transferred to the Third Program of CT, which received the name "Moscow Program of CT". In 1984, the coverage of the Second Program of CT broadcasting reached 75% of the population of the USSR.

The program's broadcasts were of various genres - they were repeats of feature films (the "Repeat TV Film Session" and "From the Central Television Collections" sections, until May 13, 1991 - usually one in the middle of the day, one before the end of the broadcasts, from May 13 to November 18, 1991 - only in the middle of the day), premieres of feature films (until the fall of 1990, extremely rare after that), repeats of feature films (the "Illusion" section, until the fall of 1990, extremely rare after that), premieres of feature films (the "Movie Serpentine" section), documentaries, sports broadcasts, concerts, documentary and educational programs, children's programs, cartoons, and the like. Reruns of some of the "First Program of Central Television" programs were also aired. Until May 24, 1991, the morning and afternoon broadcasts broadcast a block of educational programs, the Educational Program of the Central Television (except for weekends and school holidays); after May 24, 1991, only foreign language lessons were shown.

Since May 13, 1991, the airtime of the second channel was divided between the "Second Program of the Central Television" and Russian Television (RTV), which belonged to the All-Russia State Television and Radio Broadcasting Company.

On September 1, 1991, the second channel stopped showing the information program of the Central Television. In September-December 1991, the "Second Program of the Central Television" was still on the air - mainly on weekdays in the morning and afternoon blocks (and practically without any design); and in the evening prime time and on weekends, almost the entire airtime was transferred to "RTV".

RTV started broadcasting in blocks on 13 May 1991 at 5pm, timesharing with Programme Two.

== See also ==
- Soviet Central Television
- Eastern Bloc information dissemination
