= Orbita (TV system) =

Soviet and later Russian satellite TV distribution system

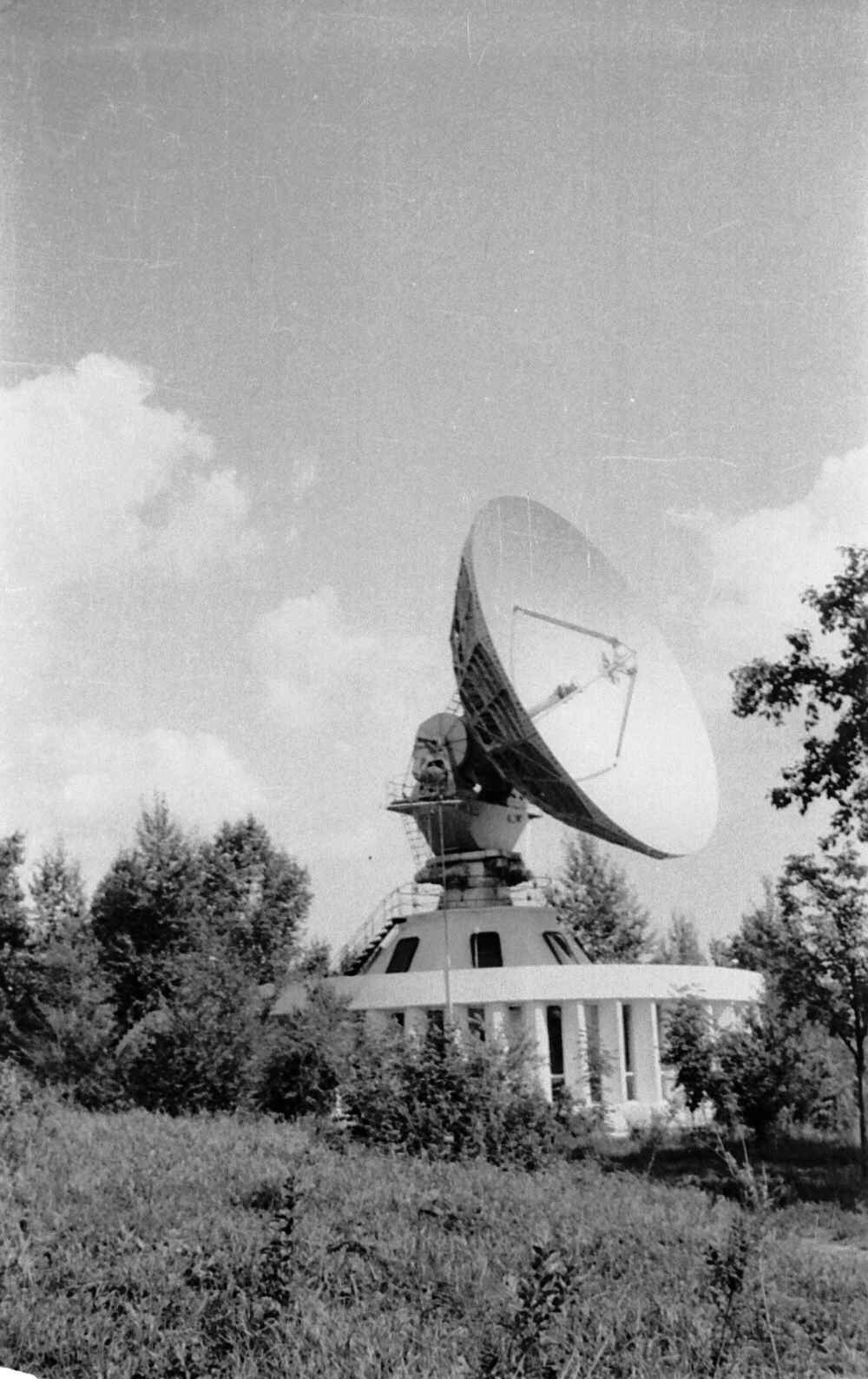
Orbita ground station. Khabarovsk. 1977

Orbita (Russian: орбита) is a Soviet-Russian system of broadcasting and delivering TV signals via satellites. It is considered to be the first national network of satellite television.

The Orbita system is based on communication satellites in highly elliptical Molniya orbits, as well as on many ground downlink TV stations for reception and relaying TV signals to antennas of TV sets of many local areas. The full deployment of the Orbita satellite system took place on 25 October 1967, when ground downlink stations of some cities of Soviet Siberia and the Far East began to receive regular TV programmes from Moscow-based uplink stations via a constellation of Molniya satellites.

The Molniya 1 series of satellites were used to initiate the system in 1967.
