= Radio-1 (Russia) =

Russian radio station

Radio-1 Радио-1
- Russia
- Frequencies: 171 kHz and 234 kHz

Programming
- Language: Russian
- Format: News, talk, and music

Ownership
- Owner: State Television and Radio Broadcasting Company Ostankino (1992-1996)
- Sister stations: Radio Mayak, Radio Yunost, Radio Orfey (1992-1996)

History
- First air date: 1 January 1992
- Last air date: 23 November 1997
- Former names: Radio-1 Ostankino (1 January 1992—11 October 1995)

Links
- Website: radio-1.narod.ru

Radio-1 (Russian: Радио-1) was a Russian radio channel from 1992 to 1997. It was broadcast by the State Television and Radio Broadcasting Company Ostankino from 1992 to 1996 and following the abolition of the latter as a standalone entity from 1996 to 1997. The editorial offices and studios of the television and radio company on which it broadcast on the radio channel were located in the Ostankino Technical Center.

== History ==
It was formally opened with the blessing of Patriarch of Moscow, Alexy II, on 8 February 1991 as Radio-1 on the basis of All Union First Programme.

On 27 December 1991, following the dissolution of the Soviet Union, the broadcasting of the program was transferred to the Russian State Television and Radio Broadcasting Company Ostankino (the latter was created to replace the All-Union State Television and Radio Broadcasting Company). In the following years, competition for airtime between Radio 1 and Radio Yunost intensified. As a result, the once-global All Union First Programme (Radio 1)'s national broadcasting volume began to decline, and its authority waned. and on 12 October 1995, the process of its liquidation began, and on 17 May 1996, broadcasting on the radio channel was transferred to the state institution of the same name, but on 19 September 1997, it was liquidated.

Among its anchors were Gleb Skorokhodov, Victor Tatarskiy, Dmitry Ukhov, Galina Besedina, Diana Berlin, Pavel Voshchanov and Raisa Shabanova
