= All Union First Programme =

Soviet radio channel

All Union First Programme Первая общесоюзная программа
- Moscow; Soviet Union

Programming
- Language: Russian
- Format: News, talk, and music

Ownership
- Owner: Gostelradio
- Sister stations: Radio Mayak; Radio Yunost

History
- First air date: November 23, 1924
- Last air date: December 31, 1991
- Former names: Comintern Radio Station (23 November 1924–31 December 1933); All-Union Radio (1 January 1934–9 March 1945)

The All-Union First Programme (Russian: Первая общесоюзная программа, romanized: Pervaya obshesoyuznaya programma) was a radio station in the Soviet Union. It had a political focus and discussed events in the Soviet Union. The All Union First Programme transmitted its program set over mediumwave and VHF.

In connection with the dissolution of the Soviet Union, the All Union First Programme ceased its transmission in December 1991. In Russia, Radio-1 began broadcasting on the former frequencies of the All Union First Programme.

== History ==
The All-Union Radio was established in Moscow and began broadcasting on November 23, 1924, initially on long and medium waves, later also on ultra-short waves, distributed via the wire broadcasting system on Channel 1 (directly in the audio frequency band, as a result of which the simplest subscriber loudspeaker was required for reception). The channel was changed to the All Union First Programme in 1945 with a political focus. In 1960, a duplicate of the First Program of All-Union Radio for the Russian Far East was introduced (Khabarovsk 270 kHz), in 1964 a second duplicate of the First Program of All-Union Radio was introduced. By the end of the 1970s, there were four duplicates of the First Program of All-Union Radio. On January 1, 1991, the name Radio-1 was assigned to the 1st Program of All-Union Radio.

On September 2, 1991, the retransmission of Radio-1 was transferred from the 1st to the 3rd channel of wired broadcasting, the frequencies of Radio-1 on ultra-short waves were transferred to Radio Russia, and in those regions and areas where Radio-2 was retransmitted in this range, Radio-1 was transferred to its frequencies. The other open frequencies of the All Union First Programme were taken over by the state radio channels of the newly independent republics.

== See also ==
- Broadcasting in the Soviet Union
- Eastern Bloc information dissemination
