= Broadcasting in the Soviet Union =

Radio and television in the Marxist-Leninist Eurasian country

Broadcasting in the Soviet Union was owned by the Soviet state, and was under its tight control and Soviet censorship. Through the development of satellites and SECAM, controlled broadcasting was initialized as the main frequency for distributing information and entertainment. Under the control of the Soviet Union, censorship and limitation on information was filtered for the citizens to ensure the common culture and socialist ideals were maintained.

The USSR State Committee for Television and Radio Broadcasting (Russian: Государственный комитет СССР по телевидению и радиовещанию; abbreviated as Gosteleradio SSSR (Russian: Гостелерадио СССР) or simply Gosteleradio (Russian: Гостелерадио)), the Soviet Union's governing body of broadcasting, was in charge both of television networks and radio stations. During this time of political propaganda and war, controlling the large and spread out population meant censorship and lock downs on the freedom of public speaking. Soviet Russia did not tolerate "a slip of the tongue."

== Broadcasting problems ==
Size, geography, time, and censorship attributed many issues to the development of broadcasting. The Soviet Union's size caused several problems to overcome. The first was geography; the European area of the Soviet Union was typical East European. At its peak, almost 8,650,000 square miles (22,400,000 km^{2}) of land mass belonged to the U.S.S.R. Then there were the mountains such as the Urals. There were also the taiga and steppes of the east and the north. Another problem was time; the Soviet Union encompassed 11 different time zones, and thus what would be shown at 18:00 in Moscow would be different from 18:00 in Frunze, Kirghizia. The population too was unevenly spread out, the overwhelming majority being west of the Urals. In addition, the Soviet Union also relayed their programming to other Warsaw Pact states. Each population was then characterized by different economic and cultural elements. There were exclusively agricultural regions or industrial regions, needing their own satellite systems from broadcasting services.

As a result, Soviet television and Soviet radio required ingenuity to overcome the aforementioned problems as well as to transmit programming to the Eastern bloc.

== Overview ==
"With the entire apparatus of cultural and artistic practice under centralized control, and production across all media generated by one officially endorsed methodology, the Soviet leadership was in an ideal position to saturate the marketplace with its product. The nature of this product was complex and all-encompassing, and was marketed as a new form of civilization. In order for fundamental changes in behavior and massive transformation of the landscape to occur, the population had to be engaged and mobilized to adopt the ideology (and goals and vision) of the leadership as their own" Broadcasting owned by the governing body ensured the right information and propaganda would be distributed in order to keep that vision intact.

== Soviet standards ==
=== Broadcast radio ===
Soviet domestic stations broadcast on shortwave, MW, LW and VHF wavebands, though the majority of stations were on medium and long wave. Neither the transmission sites nor the frequencies of domestic FM, MW, LW or SW stations were ever disclosed, thus leaving listeners having to memorize the frequencies.

=== Television ===
SECAM users

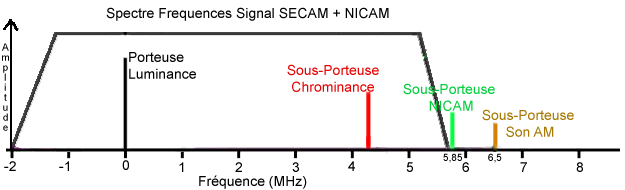
Spectres of SECAM and NICAM

The Soviet Union used SECAM D (VHF) and K (UHF) (also known as CIS-SECAM). The Soviet Union also used the OIRT VHF band (the "R" channels ranging from chs. R1 to R12) and the pan-European/African UHF band.

SECAM (Sequential Color with Memory) was initiated in 1956. Soviets involvement began with the NIR which was covered by the Nautchno-Issledovatelski research institute. Non-linear in which a process analogous to gamma correction is used and SECAM IV that omits this process were the standards utilized initially.

== Radio services ==
=== Home services ===
There were four national radio channels. The first was the All-Union First Programme. It broadcast items of national interest along with local opt-out programmes in each of the Republics. The second channel was called Radio Mayak (Radio Beacon in Russian) and was a music and speech entertainment channel intended to be the "beacon" of Soviet culture, similar to BBC Radio 2 in the UK or Radio National in Australia. And the All-Union Third Programme carried the programme strands Radio Yunost and Radio Orfey.

=== External services ===
Most people who have listened to shortwave are familiar with Radio Moscow, the main Soviet shortwave radio station. However, that's only part of the picture. Soviet radio also had Radio Station Peace and Progress, officially called the "Voice of Soviet Public Opinion". Most republics also had an external service, relayed by Radio Moscow's transmitters. Radio Moscow also relayed other radio stations from their satellite states, such as Radio Afghanistan.

== Television services ==
=== National television channels ===
Generally there were five channels (called "programmes" in the typical European fashion then) under the banner of the unified brand of Soviet Central Television. The first channel (1st Programme) was the main channel. It was also the most adaptable for the republics to utilize (see "Regional services" below). Other channels were the All Union Programme (the second channel), the Moscow Programme (the third channel aimed mostly at Moscow), the Fourth Programme (the fourth channel) and the "Leningrad Programme" (the 5th channel aimed at Leningrad viewers).

=== Television programming ===
Soap operas and TV series of original cast were rare until the last decade; a notable example is Seventeen Moments of Spring which quickly became a cult film. It involved the exploits of Stierlitz, a Soviet super-spy in Nazi Germany, who inspired many jokes (see Russian humour). However, in the later years quite a few of soap operas were brought in from the West (United States, Brazil, etc.), and a number of detective series were cast locally.

==== Soviet Programs ====
During this period, the state used programs, films, and animations to redraw its citizens to the Soviet culture and away from the western ideas that were brought home during the war. Short animations were introduced that negatively portrayed western culture and reiterated the ideas of old Russia, such as The Stranger's Voice, which aired in 1949. Specifically, this segment targeted American Jazz, comparing it to a magpie's call. Comparing jazz and a magpie's lack of musical ability meant there was no true art as there was in Soviet music, and that this American music was all for show with no actual talent required.

With the initial release of filming worldwide, exciting American movies had almost no competition, which citizens of all classes in the Soviet State flocked into. In this period, external influences began to shape the union. from its initial introduction, the Soviet take on films opposed western. In its creation, its prime focus was to maintain the socialist ideals and culture. In most of these cases the films encompassed these socialists values through fact-based films and documentary footage montage with exciting story lines and stunts.

== Regional services ==
Chechen-Ingush ASSR

In addition to the national radio and television channels, each SSR and ASSR had its own state radio and television company or state broadcasting committees, although other regions were allowed regional state broadcasting companies/committees. Taking the Chechen-Ingush ASSR as an example, one would see that there was a lot of flexibility in the Soviet radio and television system.

Like other areas of the Soviet Union, the four national television channels, Radio Mayak, the All-Union First and Third Programmes, and (if equipped with appropriate transmitters) Radio Moscow would be broadcast by either a Television and Radio Company of the Chechen-Ingush Autonomous Soviet Socialist Republic or by a State Committee on Radio and Television Broadcasting. However, in the First Programme (TV) and in the All-Union First Programme (radio), the Company/Committee was allowed to broadcast regional programming alongside the official First Programme/All-Union First Programme schedule. Depending on the political status of an administrative division, the Company/Committee would broadcast the regional programming in either Russian or the local language. In the Chechen-Ingush ASSR's case, the regional programmes would be broadcast in Russian, Chechen, or Ingush.

The Company/Committee would also broadcast additional channels for their coverage area only. Such cases were usually a second programme, known by a special name, in the main language of the SSR/ASSR. Other districts had their own local programming, and cities such as Moscow and Leningrad had special programs, broadcasting only in the evening and on FM.

== Satellite services ==
Aside from Canada's ANIK satellite system and the U.S.'s satellite system, the Soviet Union had the largest domestic satellite system in the world. The Soviet Union time-shifted programmes in order to cover its 11 time zones. This involved several solutions to the Soviet Union's geography and time zone problems:

- "Schedule. The national television channels were only on the air for part of the day. This would make it easy for transmitting the channels throughout the country. For instance, the Fourth Programme aired from 1300-1740 GMT. This would make it easy for the Fourth Programme to be aired by satellite.
- Time-shifting. This is the heart of the programming aspect of the Soviet television system. By time-shifting programmes, this allowed the Soviet Union and countries that relayed Soviet television (such as Warsaw Pact states) to broadcast programming in their own time zone."

=== The timeshift grid ===
There were two types of timeshifting in the Soviet Union. The first was used by both the All-Union First Programme and the First Programme (TV). For simplicity, this system is denoted as the "Radio/TV Orbita" system (named after the editions of these 1st programmes when they are time-shifted). All other national television channels (the All-Union, Moscow, Fourth, Leningrad and Sixth Programmes), including Radio Mayak and the Third Programme, used the "Double program" composite time-shifting format.

==== The Radio/TV Orbita system ====
- Radio/TV Orbita-1 (UTC +11, +12, and +13 time zones or MSK +7, MSK +8, and MSK +9)
- Radio/TV Orbita-2 (UTC +9 and +10 time zones or MSK +6 and MSK +7)
- Radio/TV Orbita-3 (UTC +7 and +8 time zones or MSK +4 and MSK +5)
- Radio/TV Orbita-4 (UTC +5 and +6 time zones or MSK +2 and MSK +3)
- All-Union First Programme/First Programme (UTC +2, +3, and +4 time zones or MSK -1, MSK, and MSK +1)

==== The "Double Program" system ====
The "double program" system was the other system used for time-shifting programmes. Like the "Radio/TV Orbita" system, identical content would be broadcast on the time-shifted versions, and, in the case of the Third Programme (radio), followed the same type of editions as the All-Union First Programme. However, it was different in that, especially on TV, it was a composite time-shifting system. This means that multiple services could be broadcast on the same edition and thus reduce the cost of broadcasting several different editions of the channels.

Editions of the Third Programme (radio):

- Third Double-1 (UTC +11 and +12 time zones)
- Third Double-2 (UTC +9 and +10 time zones)
- Third Double-3 (UTC +7 and +8 time zones)
- Third Double-4 (UTC +5 and +6 time zones)
- Third Programme (UTC +2, +3, and +4 time zones)

Composite editions of the All-Union, Moscow, and Fourth Programmes (TV):

- Double 2 (UTC +9 and +10 time zones)
- Double 3 (UTC +7 and +8 time zones)
- Double 4 (UTC +5 and +6 time zones)

=== The satellites ===
The Soviet Union set up the great space race that would lead to international technological, political, cultural, and scientific exploration. The Soviet domestic satellite system was also known as Orbita - in 1990 there were 90 Orbita satellites, supplying programming to 900 main transmitters and over 4,000 relay stations. The most famous Soviet satellites were the Molniya satellites; other satellite groups were the Gorizont, Ekran, and Stasionar satellites. With the right equipment, people outside the Soviet Union who used TVRO satellite television could receive Soviet television programming.

Since the 1970s, Russia has implemented the newer geostationary orbit "Horizont" satellites utilized by the Russian Space Television system. New satellites are released into orbit as older versions deteriorate and new technology becomes available. Operated by the State Enterprise "Kosmicheskaya Svyaz" there was constant maintenance of satellites as well as revision, censorship, and management performed through this main facility. At its peak, the Soviet Space program, in competition with the United States, pushed for newer advancements and technologies, leading to the Space race.

== ITAR-TASS broadcasting ==
The Soviet Union's radio news and television news was provided almost entirely by the Telegraph Agency of the Soviet Union, commonly known as TASS until 1991. Under the rule of Emperor Nikolai II, the first broadcasting system began in 1904, and evolved into TASS in 1925.

TASS still exists today, transformed into the Information Telegraph Agency of Russia (ITAR-TASS). It occupies a Joseph Stalin-era building in Moscow, characterised by a bas-relief sculpture above the main entrance. However, much like its counterparts in cinema and the press, it has suffered since the break-up of Soviet Union. ITAR now broadcasts domestic news, while TASS reports the world news and events abroad.

== Broadcasting post-Soviet Union ==
With the collapse of the Soviet Union in 1991, the broadcasting landscape also changed. Instead of one uniform system for radio and television broadcasting, there are now multiple systems, one for each country. Nowhere is this more obvious than in the republics themselves. Below is an incomplete list of the changes to the television system in the republics, in alphabetical order:

=== Armenia ===
==== 1990 ====
Broadcasters: Radio Yerevan (radio), Public Television company of Armenia (TV)

==== 2005 ====
Main broadcasters: Hayastani Azgain Radio (Armenian National Radio), Armenian National Television, Armenia TV

=== Azerbaijan ===
==== 1990 ====
Broadcasters: Radio Baku (radio), AzTV (TV)

==== 2005 ====
Main broadcaster: Azärbaycan Dövlät Teleradio Verilisläri Sirkäti (State Radio and Television Company of Azerbaijan)

=== Belarus ===
==== 1990 ====
Broadcasters: Radio Minsk (radio), Minskaja studija televidenija (TV)

==== 2005 ====
Main broadcaster: Nacyjanalnaja Dzjarzaúnaja Teleradyjokampanija Respubliki Belarus (State Television and Radio Company of Belarus)

=== Estonia ===
==== 1990 ====
Broadcasters: Eesti Raadio (radio), Eesti Televisioon (TV)

==== 2005 ====
Main broadcasters: Eesti Raadio, Eesti Televisioon, Kanal 2, TV3 ViaSat

=== Georgia ===
==== 1990 ====
Broadcasters: Radio Tbilisi (radio), Tbiliskaja studija televidenija (TV)

==== 2005 ====
Main broadcaster: Saqartvelos Teleradio Korporacia (Georgian National Broadcasting Corporation)

=== Tajikistan ===
1990 Broadcaster: State Committee for Broadcasting and Television of the Republic of Tajikistan

- Radio Dushanbe

2005 Main broadcaster: Tajik Radio

== See also ==
- Radio in the Soviet Union
- Television in the Soviet Union
- Eastern Bloc information dissemination
- Censorship in the Soviet Union
- Propaganda in the Soviet Union

== Sources ==
NB: Some of the information in this article is from the 1990 edition of the World Radio TV Handbook). Other information is from the Television in the Soviet Union and Radio in the Soviet Union articles.
