= International Radio and Television Organisation =

Alliance of media entities

- Organisation Internationale de Radiodiffusion et de Télévision
- The OIRT logo

- Members at the date of dissolution Members who participated at various times before dissolution Associate members
- Merged into: European Broadcasting Union
- Established: 28 June 1946; 80 years ago
- Dissolved: 1 January 1993; 33 years ago
- Type: Union of broadcasting organisations
- Headquarters: Brussels, Belgium (1946–1950); Prague, Czechoslovakia (1950–1993)

The International Radio and Television Organisation (official name in French: Organisation Internationale de Radiodiffusion et de Télévision or OIRT (before 1960 International Broadcasting Organization (IBO), official name in French: Organisation Internationale de Radiodiffusion (OIR)) was an East European network of radio and television broadcasters with the primary purpose of establishing ties and securing an interchange of information between those various organizations responsible for broadcasting services, promoting the interests of broadcasting, seeking by international cooperation a solution to any matter relating to broadcasting, and studying and working out all measures having as their aim the development of broadcasting.

== General description ==
OIRT was presented as a voluntary non-profit association of television and radio broadcasting organizations, with the aim of exchanging programs, as well as information related to program production and technical development. Achieving this goal was considered the key to spreading truthful information and cultural values throughout the world community. Unlike the European Broadcasting Union (European Broadcasting Area), the OIRT did not have its own broadcasting area or other regional borders, within which the membership of broadcasting organizations was possible.

OIRT was funded by membership fees paid by all members of the organization, income from publishing and other sources. The Organization collaborated with international and regional (in particular, with the EBU) broadcasting organizations, the United Nations and UNESCO, as well as with various telecommunications organizations. In particular, OIRT had the status of a category C organization in UNESCO, was included in the register of ECOSOC organizations, had consultative status with the International Telecommunication Union, and collaborated with the International Council on Film and Television. OIRT was a member of the International Conference of Broadcasting Unions, and in 1986 hosted the Fifth World Conference of Broadcasting Unions in Prague, which brought together 175 representatives from 9 broadcasting organizations.

The statutory objectives of the OIRT (Article II of the Charter) were:

- establishing links between various organizations providing radio and television broadcasting and those in compliance with the provisions of the OIRT Charter;
- to ensure, as far as possible, a complete mutual exchange of information between OIRT members on the technical progress of sound and television broadcasting, on various schemes aimed at improving broadcasting methods, and, in general, on all measures taken in the field of broadcasting;
- comprehensive protection of the interests of radio and television in all areas;
- finding solutions to broadcasting problems through international cooperation;
- the study and development of all measures generally aimed at the development of radio and television, especially the development of broadcasting technology;
- study and develop measures that are important for the rapid development of radio and television broadcasting methods in insufficiently electrified regions and regions with specific climatic conditions.

The potential TV audience of OIRT reached 350 million viewers. The official languages of the OIRT since 1946 have been English, Russian and French. Chinese was briefly granted official status in 1952 when it was accepted into the OIRT of China. Since 1959, German has been given the status of the official language of OIRT conferences and publications. Throughout its existence, the organization retained the French-language abbreviation OIRT as its name, while the English-language IBO was used only occasionally.

OIRT produced periodicals: the monthly newsletter OIRT Information, as well as the Radio and Television magazine, which was published six times a year and had a small editorial office in Prague. The journal's publications (in English, French, Russian, and German) reported on the activities of the OIRT and its members, as well as on the work of all bodies and their sub-commissions. Catalogs of Transmissions suitable for Exchange were released four times a year, which were sent to both OIRT participants and Eurovision members (since 1956, catalogs of radio programs, since 1960, catalogs of TV shows).

== History ==
The activities of the International Broadcasting Union (IBU‑UIR) ceased with the outbreak of World War II: its observation and technical center in Brussels fell under Nazi control and served the Wehrmacht, including as a listening station for Allied radio communications. After the war, the IBU was considered discredited due to its collaboration with the Nazi regime and did not enjoy the trust of European countries, especially the USSR, which insisted on its dissolution. In March 1946, at the Brussels international meeting of broadcasters, the USSR proposed the creation of a new organization with Soviet influence and authority for global wave redistribution. The new organization proposed to introduce a voting model in which the volume of votes is proportional to the area of the country and the number of radio transmitters on its territory.

Meanwhile, the United Kingdom, which suspended relations with the IBU in 1941, was considering ways to revive the IBU in a new format, vacillating between temporary membership in it and an emphasis on the priority of redistributing waves between major countries before creating some kind of new broadcasting association. On 14 June 1946, the BBC notified the committee for the re-establishment of the union of its refusal to join the IBU. Two weeks later, the UK actually found itself on the sidelines of international cooperation.

Without British participation, 26 members founded the OIR on 28 June 1946. The next day, at the General Assembly of the International Broadcasting Union (IBU), an attempt was made to dissolve this body, but the motion failed to obtain the required majority. However, 18 of the 28 existing members left the IBU and become co-founders of the new OIR.

In 1946, the newly created OIR installed itself in the IBU building in Brussels. Technical activity was taken up again under the authority of two directors, one delegated by the Soviet Union and the other by France. However, the political situation gradually degraded into the Cold War and this created an uneasy situation of distrust within the staff of the Technical Centre.

The BBC, determined to create a new broadcasting organization under the auspices of the United Nations, expected that the 1946 United Nations Conference on broadcasting would bring order to the dilemma, but the conference did not take place that year, and the United Nations broadcasting conferences in Atlantic City and Copenhagen that followed in 1947 and 1948 could not come up with fundamental solutions. The BBC's proposal to join the OIR in exchange for a change in the voting procedure (distribution of votes in accordance with membership in the International Telecommunication Union - thus, only one broadcaster from each ITU member state would have the right to vote), proposed by the British earlier, did not pass. The business climate in negotiations between broadcasters has steadily deteriorated as tensions between Western and socialist states have grown and the Berlin crisis has developed.

Since 1948, the BBC began preparing to establish a new broadcasting organization. On 19 May 1948, the OIR issued a statement from Brussels declaring itself "the sole representative European body in the field of broadcasting." Throughout 1949, a series of consultations were held to resolve the current crisis, with the central meeting being the August meeting of the IBU Council and the heads of the OIR and the BBC in Stresa, Italy. The Italian broadcaster RAI, a member of both conflicting organizations, hoped to mediate the disputed issues. However, after several meetings, the old differences could not be resolved, and the meeting was deemed a failure.

At the same time, in Stresa, at the initiative of the BBC, a Western European consensus began to emerge: if the OIR did not agree to change its charter to suit British broadcasting, United Kingdom would begin creating a new union with a core of Marshall Plan countries. The Belgian, French, Italian, and Dutch delegations immediately made it clear that they were prepared to leave the OIR, provided a new union was created and after consultations with national authorities. Three months later, at the OIR General Assembly in Brussels in November 1949, broadcasters from Belgium, France, Italy, and the Netherlands announced their withdrawal from the OIR. They were joined by broadcasters from Luxembourg, Monaco, Morocco, Tunisia, Lebanon and Egypt.

In 1950, some members (mostly western European) left the organization to form the new European Broadcasting Union (EBU), among them Belgium, Egypt, France, Italy, Lebanon, Luxembourg, Monaco, Morocco, Netherlands, Tunisia and Yugoslavia.

Broadcasting organizations from the following countries remained members: Albania, Bulgaria, Czechoslovakia, Finland (also a member of EBU), Hungary, Poland, Romania, and the Soviet Union (including individual members from the Byelorussian SSR, Karelo-Finnish SSR, Latvian SSR, Lithuanian SSR, Moldavian SSR, Ukrainian SSR and Estonian SSR).

As a consequence, the OIR headquarters and its Technical Centre was relocated from Brussels to Prague in 1950. Staff members from Belgium and other Western countries, some of whom had already been active before the war, stayed on in Brussels and the centre became the technical centre of the new EBU.

Unlike the EBU, the OIRT was not limited to European and Mediterranean countries and operated as a global organization. Members of the organization included countries aligned with the Eastern bloc, such as Cuba, Vietnam, the People's Republic of China and North Korea (although the latter's membership was temporarily inactive after their break with the USSR), as well as the allies of the USSR that were temporarily led by communist parties, such as Nicaragua and the Democratic Republic of Afghanistan, and the African and Middle Eastern states having been temporarily associated or supported by the socialist camp.

Since 1957, OIRT has established cooperation with the European Broadcasting Union at the level of technical committees, and since 1965, cooperation has begun between the programming committees of these organizations. In July 1959, the OIR changed its name to the Organisation Internationale de Radiodiffusion et de Télévision (OIRT).

Since the mid-1960s, the OIRT has been supporting and assisting broadcasters from African and Asian countries, including providing methodological assistance, material for radio and television broadcasts, and sometimes consulting services (GDR Television participated in the creation of Vietnam Television and also assisted in the restoration of Cambodian television after the Pol Pot regime). Since 1978, Czechoslovak Television has been holding training seminars for broadcasters on editing and program production. Since the early 1970s, GDR Television has been training personnel for television and radio broadcasting in developing countries and regularly attracting fellows to the country for training. In the late 1980s, the OIRT itself planned to establish a Coordination Bureau for Cooperation with Developing Countries.

Since 1968, in order to coordinate the coverage of the Olympic Games, the EBU/OIRT Task Force was formed for the first time, consisting of 160 people representing European broadcasters from both unions and representatives of the Mexican Olympic broadcaster, which ensured the transmission of 136 hours of sporting events to the European continent.

Since 1960, the OIRT and the EBU have been actively cooperating on the following issues: expanding the exchange of artistic programs between Intervision and Eurovision, as well as solving legal and financial difficulties; expanding the exchange of relevant programs; technical work of exchange networks, especially qualitative improvement of image and sound channels for broadcasting; distribution of rights to broadcast major international sports events, as well as advertising issues within these broadcasts, the cost of licenses for sports programs. In the 1970s and 1980s, OIRT collaborated with EBU and other international broadcasting organizations in the field of cooperative acquisition of sports rights to broadcast the Summer and Winter Olympic Games, as well as the FIFA World Cups. For example, for showing the 1984 Summer Olympics in Los Angeles, the EBU paid an average of $17 per broadcast per TV receiver, while the OIRT paid $0.5.

On November 18, 1971, nine OIRT members signed an agreement on the creation of the Intersputnik system. In 1986, OIRT developed the concept of the international channel Interprogramm.

Due to the transformation processes in Central and Eastern Europe, which began in 1986, it became necessary to reorient the OIRT, with further opening to new participants organized by the state, the private sector and public law organizations from non-socialist foreign countries and the corresponding amendments to the organization's charter introduced in 1989. During this period, calls for closer cooperation with the European Broadcasting Union began to increase, as well as proposals for the elimination of the OIRT.

On September 23, 1992, the last meeting of the Intervision Governing Council was held in Moscow. On 1 January 1993, following the dissolution of the Soviet Union and the end of the Cold War, the OIRT merged with the European Broadcasting Union and all European OIRT memberships were transferred to the EBU.

== Intervision ==
One of several logos used by the Intervision Network. This one comes from the Soviet Union.

The television network of OIRT was established in 1960 and was called Intervision (Russian Интервидение, German Intervision, Albanian Intervizioni, Bulgarian Интервизия, Polish Interwizja, Czech Intervize, Slovak Intervízia, Hungarian Intervízió, Romanian Interviziune, Finnish Intervisio).

The Eastern Bloc counterpart of Eurovision Network, Intervision is an international television organization within the framework of the OIRT for the exchange of programs between its member broadcasting organizations and the preparation of programs transmitted through its channels.

Intervision membership was available to any television organization, regardless of its country's membership in the OIRT, subject to its agreement with the organization's goal of promoting peaceful cooperation between peoples and the provisions of the Intervision Charter. The Intervision Charter regulated such aspects as: program planning, obligations of the organization's participants, programming management rules, qualitative parameters of the radio range and sound channels, methods of control measurements of sound and image channels. The network grew more slowly than Eurovision, but had a more global scale, stretching from Central and Eastern Europe to the Caribbean and Northeast Asia.

Like OIRT, Intervision did not pursue commercial goals, and operated on the basis of membership fees necessary for the functioning of the network's coordination centers. The amount of membership fees was calculated based on the number of TV receivers in the participating country. At the same time, Intervision did not have its own dedicated network, it was formed from international television channels provided by TV channels of Intervision member countries. It was emphasized that Intervision is not a new organization with its own television network, but an association of existing national television networks, which, including the points of intersection between individual countries, form an Intervision system in the case of international television transmission.

Intervision was supervised by the OIRT Program Committee. This committee was authorized to address the main issues of functioning and program exchange, as well as to solve theoretical problems arising in the activities of Intervision. The practical management of the network was carried out by the Intervision Council, which was authorized to develop and adopt a program exchange plan, and consisted of representatives of the member broadcasters (one from each television organization) and the General Secretary of the OIRT. Ex officio Chairman of the council was the Head of the OIRT Program Committee. The powers of the chairman had a two-year term.

The functioning of the Intervision network was provided by the technical coordination center and the program coordination center. They provided retransmission and exchange traffic between network participants and were subordinate to the Council of Intervision in the implementation of its decisions. The tasks of the coordination centers included: a) coordination of program proposals and preparation of program plans; b) organization of broadcasts that are not provided for in the planned schedule of the Intervision; c) organization of technical support for the transmission of the Intervision; d) technical support for the implementation of the planned schedule of the Intervision with television organizations that are not members of the network.

According to the regulations, the broadcast on the Intervision network was supposed to open and end with the official audio and visual identifier of the Intervision.It was regulated that before the start of the broadcast, each broadcast had to broadcast its logo for ten seconds along with the Intervision screensaver, and the broadcast of the event had to be turned on immediately after the end of the screensaver demonstration.At the end of the broadcast, the order changed - first, the broadcaster had to demonstrate its logo embedded in the Intervision screensaver, and then the visual and audio identifier of the network. Since March 29, 1971, Dmitry Shostakovich's musical composition "Pozyvnye signaly sovetskogo Intervidenia" has become the sound identifier for the beginning of broadcasting on the Intervision network. From 1960 to 1971, a snippet from a piece by Russian composer Pyotr Tchaikovsky was used as the audio identifier.

Between 1977 and 1980, the OIRT organised four Intervision Song Contests in Sopot, Poland, in an attempt to imitate the Eurovision Song Contest.

The organization ceased to exist a month before the liquidation of the OIRT itself began. The network's coordination center was located in Prague.

=== Intervision participants ===
Intervision included the following broadcasting organizations:

Country	Broadcasting organization	Abbreviation	Joined	Exited
Afghanistan	Da Afghanistan Milli Televizion	AFGRTV	1983	1992
Belarus	The studio of the Belarusian television Gosteleradio of the Belarusian SSR	TSS/BSSR	1965	1991
Belarus	Gosteleradio of the Republic of Belarus	BTRC	1991	1992
Bulgaria	Българско радио и телевизия	BT	1963	1992
Cuba	Instituto Cubano de Radio y Televisión	ICRT	1979	1992
Czechoslovakia	Československá televize	ČST	1960	1992
Estonia	Tallinna Televisioonistuudio (TTV)	TSS/ESSR	1961	1965
Estonia	Eesti Televisioon	TSS/ESSR	1965	1990
Estonia	Eesti Televisioon	ETV	1991	1992
Finland	Yleisradio	Yle	1965	1992
East Germany	Deutscher Fernsehfunk	DFF	1960	1972
East Germany	Fernsehen der DDR	DDR-FS	1972	1990
East Germany	Deutscher Fernsehfunk	DFF	1990	1990
Hungary	Magyar Televízió	MT	1960	1992
Latvia	Riga Television Studio of Gosteleradio of the Latvian SSR	TSS/LSSR	1961	1990
Latvia	Latvijas Televīzija	LTV	1990	1992
Lithuania	Gosteleradio of the Lithuanian SSR	TSS/LTSR	1965	1990
Lithuania	Lietuvos Radijas ir Televizija	LRT	1990	1992
Moldova	Radioteleviziunea Naţională a Republicii Moldova	RTNM	1990	1992
Mongolia	Mongolian national television (Монголын үндэсний телевиз)	MOTV	1972	1992
Poland	Polska Telewizja	TVP	1960	1992
Romania	Televizunea Romana	TVR	1963	1992
Russia	Radiotelevidenie Ostankino	RTO	1991	1992
Soviet Union	Central Television of the USSR (Televidenie Sovetskogo Soyuza)	TSS	1961	1991
Ukraine	Kiev Television Studio of Gosteleradio of the Ukrainian SSR	TSS/UkSSR	1961	1991
Ukraine	Derzhkomteleradio	DRTU	1991	1992
Vietnam	Vietnam Television (Đài Truyền hình Việt Nam)	VNRT	1981	1992
Observer organizations
Austria	Österreichischer Rundfunk	ORF	1963	1992
Yugoslavia	Jugoslovenska Radiotelevizija	JRT	1963	1992

=== Program exchange ===
In early 1956, broadcasters from the GDR and Czechoslovakia relayed matches of the Olympic hockey tournament held in Cortina d'Ampezzo, Italy, from the Eurovision network (hosted by Italian RAI). In 1957, broadcasters from Poland acquired the opportunity to retransmit. The idea of an international television service for Central and Eastern European countries arose at the sessions of the Council for Mutual Economic Assistance, and since May 1958 it has been the subject of discussion by television experts from Hungary, the GDR, Poland and Czechoslovakia. At that time, Czechoslovakia had the most developed television system outside the GDR, and on August 31, 1957, the first test transmission to Hungary was carried out from its territory.

In January 1960, at a meeting in Budapest, the OIRT Administrative Council decided to establish the Intervision organization. On January 31, 1960, this decision was formalized in the form of the inclusion of four original members in the Intervision - the Hungarian MT, the East German DFF, the Polish TVP and the Czechoslovak CST. Collectively, these members managed radio relay lines with a total length of about 3,000 kilometers, 30 transmitters that broadcast broadcasts on 2 million televisions used by 10 million viewers.

On September 5, 1960, the Intervision organization began its active work, the initial goals of which were aimed at the exchange of: a) live broadcasts of current events; b) programs dedicated to the economic, social, political and cultural life of the participating countries; c) feature broadcasts by classical and contemporary authors of the participating countries; d) programs for children and youth; e) entertainment programs; f) broadcasts of major national and international sporting events.

As part of the ongoing exchange of broadcasts between the Intervision and Eurovision networks, both sides agreed that the exchange of programs should be mutual and voluntary and that the respective programs should not expose the other party to political attacks or be commercially motivated. However, the members of the Eurovision network considered many of the proposals of the Intervision network to be too politicized and uninteresting. Broadcasters independently decided which programs they would choose from another network, and Intervision participants also rejected programs from the Eurovision network that, in their opinion, were commercial, politicized or religious.

In the period from 1960 to 1982, as a percentage, all programs transmitted on Intervision networks were divided into news reports and broadcasts (27%), sports reports and broadcasts (26%), entertainment programs (22%), cultural programs (21%), children's programs (4%).

The exchange of music content was based on the principles of creating a single list of programs. Each Intervision participating country prepared a set of 10 music programs, including all types of music - from classical to modern - for every three weeks. These programs were broadcast to other participating countries in blocks of five hours each according to the established schedule. It was noted that a general viewing of a music program, which would be approved by all participants of the Intervention at the same time, was an exceptional case. Cooperation usually took the form of creating a common pool of programs and shows from which individual countries could choose at their discretion what they wanted to show on their channels.

On February 1, 1982, Intervision participants began transmitting programs for retransmission via the Intersputnik satellite system in order to ease the load on terrestrial video communication channels. Satellite broadcasts were designed to provide higher technical quality of the broadcast and establish stable direct communication with non-European participants of Intervision (for example, Cuba).

=== News exchange ===
The Intervision News Exchange (IVN) was launched in May 1964 with the aim of providing reliable and up-to-date information about events in the world.

Initially, the exchange of news took place once a week - on Fridays. Since April 1965, the general exchange began to take place twice a week - on Tuesdays and Fridays, and Monday and Thursday were the days of exchange for the four Intervision broadcasters - ČST (Czechoslovakia), DFF (GDR), MT (Hungary) and TVP (Poland). Since August 1965, Monday has ceased to be an exchange day, and Tuesday, Wednesday, Thursday and Friday have become days of general exchange on the stock exchange, while the time window in which the exchange was carried out fell on the period from 14:15 to 14:45 Central European time.

Since June 1968, the Saturday exchange has been launched, ensuring the five-day operation of the exchange. From October 1969, Monday became an exchange day again, and the exchange time was moved to the period from 16:00 to 16:30 Central European time, which made it possible to increase the subject matter of the transmitted materials. Since May 1970, the Sunday exchange was launched, which ensured the daily operation of the exchange. The exchange of news was carried out on the basis of the "Television News Transmission Procedure", which regulates the operation of the exchange. It was established that the subject of operational exchange on the stock exchange are broadcasters' offers containing information about significant events of the day. If possible, information about the event should have been transmitted on the day of its completion. In case of significant technical or programmatic reasons, the exchange could be canceled or postponed to an earlier time. Important political or scientific events (for example, related to space exploration), as well as some sporting events, such as the "Peace Bike Race" or the Olympic Games, could be attributed to programmatic reasons. At least two organizations had to participate in the exchange. Broadcasters' participation in the exchange was voluntary.

The exchange was organized and coordinated by the Intervision Technical Coordination Center and the Intervision Program Coordination Center. The Program Coordination Center kept monthly and quarterly statistics on the exchange's work, which it provided for meetings of the Board of Intervision and the Group of Experts on News Exchange.

The daily standard operation of the news exchange consisted of the following stages:

- By 10:15 Central European time: broadcasters who have expressed a desire to participate in the exchange must submit their exchange proposals to the Intervision Program Coordination Center. The proposals should be briefly but exhaustively annotated, the annotations were sent by telex, and in case of problems with telex communication - by telephone or other communication channels.
- By 11:00 Central European time: The Intervision Program Coordination Center must transmit a list of all received exchange offers in Russian to all organizations interested in the exchange via telex or other communication.
- By 11:45 Central European time: broadcasters interested in the exchange should inform the Intervision Program Coordination Center about which of the exchange offers they would like to select for broadcast
- From 15:30 to 16:00 Central European time: a conference call is being held on the Intervision audio conference network under the leadership of the OIRT program coordinator from the Intervision Program Coordination Center. During this conference, broadcasters confirm and refine their proposals or submit additional exchange offers that have not been announced before. The broadcasters confirm the duration, the order of transmission, the content of the materials and any changes made. Next, the organizations dictate annotations of their proposals and a list of materials provided, which are recorded on tape by the other interested broadcasters. The purpose of the conference was to clarify or supplement previously posted information, as well as to enable broadcasters to announce in advance their exchange offers for tomorrow, which was an essential aspect for the work of the editorial staff of news studios.
- At 16:25 Central European time: transfer of selected exchange materials to the Intervision network begins under the control of the Intervision Technical Coordination Center.

By the mid-1970s, up to 4,000 news offers per year passed through the Intervision news exchange, and up to 20 news reports per broadcast day.

Since May 1971, the united news exchange with the name "Eurovision" - "Intervision" has been operating on a permanent basis. Any news event covered by the broadcasting system of a participant in one organization could be sent directly on request to any broadcasting system of a participant in another organization for use in its news programs on the same evening. The exchange was carried out daily, at 4 p.m. Central European time, through the Austrian broadcaster, a member of the European Broadcasting Union ORF.

The full list of Intervision's news offers on the united Stock Exchange was also sent to the Eurovision News Exchange Coordination Center in Geneva. Intervision's headquarters in Prague had the opportunity to listen to the daily conference call of the Eurovision News exchange, but at the insistence of the West German broadcasters, it was not able to participate in the discussions. Intervision accepted much Eurovision footage of the Soviet invasion of Czechoslovakia; while intended for news broadcasts, security forces likely used footage to identify anti-invasion protesters.

The Intervision News Exchange (IVN) included the following broadcasting organizations:

Country	Broadcasting organization	Abbreviation	Joined
Bulgaria	Българско радио и телевизия	BT	1966
China	China Central Television	CCTV	1988
Czechoslovakia	Československá televize	ČST	1964
East Germany	Deutscher Fernsehfunk	DFF	1964
Hungary	Magyar Televízió	MT	1964
Poland	Polska Telewizja	TVP	1964
Romania	Televizunea Romana	TVR	1967
Soviet Union	Central Television of the USSR	TSS	1966
Yugoslavia	Jugoslovenska Radiotelevizija	JRT	1968

== History of members ==
Participation in the OIRT was independent of any geographical or other objective conditions.

There were two types of participation: active and associate membership. Active members had the right to vote in the governing bodies of the organization, associate members were deprived of this right. All OIRT members were required to pay annual membership fees. Membership fees were calculated according to a criterion developed taking into account the number of televisions and radios in the respective country.

Applications from broadcasting organizations for membership in the OIRT had to be accompanied by information about the organization's structure, technical capabilities, and legal status. These applications were reviewed by the OIRT Administrative Council, which required a two-thirds majority of the existing quorum or the total number of council members to approve the admission of a new member to the organization.

In accordance with Article V of the OIRT Charter, the following organizations could become its members:

- government organizations that directly provide television and radio broadcasting;
- civil society organizations that provide television and radio broadcasting under the leadership of the Government;
- national civil society organizations that unite organizations that meet the membership conditions listed in the preceding paragraphs.

The Charter stipulated that each country could have only one active member. This approach also persisted in the European Broadcasting Union until 1959, when the organization's Charter was revised under pressure from British broadcasters.

At the same time, there were rules for determining the active member.:

- There is only one broadcaster of any organizational form in the country: if there was only one state-owned or one private, state-sanctioned broadcasting service in the country, then it had every reason to become the country's representative in the OIRT with the right of active membership.
- There are several state broadcasters in the country: if there were several state broadcasting services in the country that met the membership criteria, they were required to identify an active member by mutual agreement, or create a common civil organization to collectively represent them in the OIRT - the final responsibility for determining the representative was assigned to the government of the delegating country.
- There are several broadcasters in the country, both public and private: if there are both public broadcasting services (individual or group) and private state-sanctioned broadcasting services (individual or group) in the country, priority should be given to public broadcasting services when granting the right to be an active member of the OIRT.
- There are several private broadcasters in the country: if there were only private broadcasting services in the country, they were instructed to identify an active member of the OIRT by mutual agreement, and in the absence of consensus, the status of the broadcaster in the OIRT was assigned by the competent government authority.

=== Active members ===
Country	Broadcasting organization	Abbreviation	Joined	Exited
Afghanistan	Radio Television Afghanistan	AFGRTV	1978	1992
Albania	Radiodifuzioni Shqiptar	Radio Tirana	1946	1961
Algeria	Radiodiffusion télévision algérienne	RTA	1962	1992
Belgium	Institut National de Radiodiffusion	INR-NIR	1946	1949
Belarus	Gosteleradio of the Byelorussian SSR	TSS/BSSR	1946	1991
Belarus	Gosteleradio of the Republic of Belarus	BTRC	1991	1992
Bulgaria	Bulgarian Television and Radio	BTR	1946	1971
Bulgaria	Bulgarian State Committee for Television and Radio Broadcasting		1971	1977
Bulgaria	Българска телевизия/Българското радио	BT/BR	1977	1986
Bulgaria	Bulgarian State Committee for Television and Radio Broadcasting		1986	1990
Bulgaria	Bălgarsko Nationalno Radio/Bălgarska Nationalna Televizija	BNR/BNT	1990	1992
Cambodia	Radio Television Cambodge	RTC	1981	1992
China	Central Bureau of Television and Radio Broadcasting		1952	1966
Cuba	Instituto Cubano de Radio y Televisión	ICRT	1962	1992
Czechoslovakia	Radiojournal		1946	1948
Czechoslovakia	Československý rozhlasový výbor	CRV	1948	1954
Czechoslovakia	Československý výbor pro rozhlas a televizi	CVRT	1954	1992
Egypt	Egyptian State Telegraphs and Telephones		1946	1949
Estonia	Gosteleradio of the Estonian SSR	TSS/ESSR	1946	1990
Estonia	Eesti Raadio/Eesti Televisioon	ER/ETV	1991	1992
Finland	Yleisradio	Yle	1946	1992
France	Radiodiffusion française	RDF	1946	1949
East Germany	Das Staatliche Rundfunkkomitee	SKR	1952	1968
East Germany	Staatliches Komitee für Rundfunk/Staatliche Komitee für Fernsehen	StKfR/SKF	1968	1989
East Germany	Rundfunk der DDR/Deutscher Fernsehfunk	DDR/DFF	1989	1990
Hungary	Magyar Rádió	MR	1946	1950
Hungary	Magyar Rádióhivatal	MRH	1950	1957
Hungary	Magyar Rádió és Televízió	MRT	1957	1974
Hungary	Magyar Rádió/Magyar Televízió	MR/MTV	1974	1992
Iraq	Iraqi Broadcasting and Television Establishment	IBTE		1992
Italy	Radio Audizioni Italia	RAI	1946	1949
Karelo-Finnish SSR	Committee on Radioification and Broadcasting		1946	1956
Latvia	Gosteleradio of the Latvian SSR	TSS/LSSR	1946	1990
Latvia	Latvijas Radio/Latvijas Televīzija	LR/LTV	1991	1992
Laos	Lao National Radio and Television	RTNL	1983	1992
Lebanon	Service de Radiodiffusion de la République Libanaise	SRRL	1947	1949
Lithuania	Gosteleradio of the Lithuanian SSR	TSS/LTSR	1946	1990
Lithuania	Lietuvos Radijas ir Televizija	LRT	1991	1992
Luxembourg	Compagnie luxembourgeoise de radiodiffusion	CLR	1946	1949
Mali	Radio Nationale du Mali	RNM	1961	
Moldova	Gosteleradio of the Moldavian SSR	TSS/MSSR	1946	1990
Moldova	Radioteleviziunea Naţională a Republicii Moldova	TRM	1991	1992
Monaco	Radio Monte Carlo	RMC	1946	1950
Mongolia	Mongol Radio and Television	MRTV	1967	1992
Morocco	Office chérifien des Postes, Télégraphes et Téléphones	Radio-Maroc	1946	1949
Netherlands	Stichting Radio Nederland in den Overgangstijd	RNIO	1946	1947
Netherlands	Nederlandse Radio Unie	NRU	1947	1949
Nicaragua	Sistema Sandinista de Televisión	SSTV	1984	1990
Nicaragua	Sistema Nacional de Televisión	SNTV	1990	1992
North Korea	Korean Central Broadcasting Committee	KCBC	1953	1992
Poland	Polskie Radio	PR	1946	1949
Poland	Centralny Urząd Radiofonii	CUR	1949	1951
Poland	Komitet do Spraw Radia i Telewizji	PRTV	1951	1992
Romania	Comitetul de Radiodifuziune şi Televiziune	CRT	1946	1974
Romania	Radioteleviziunii Române	RTR	1974	1992
Russia	Russian State TV and Radio Company «Ostankino»	RTO	1991	1992
South Yemen	Yemen Radio and Television	YRT	1984	1992
Soviet Union	Gosteleradio of the USSR	TSS	1946	1991
Soviet Union	All-Union State Television and Radio Broadcasting Company	RTSS	1991	1992
Syria	Syrian Broadcasting Organization	SBO	1946	1950
Tunisia	Office des Postes, Télégraphes et Téléphones	Radio-Tunis	1946	1949
Ukraine	Gosteleradio of the Ukrainian SSR	TSS/UkSSR	1946	1991
Ukraine	Derzhkomteleradio	DRTU	1991	1992
Vatican	Radio Vaticana	RV	1946	1950
Vietnam	Viet Nam Radio and Television	VNRT	1956	1992
Yugoslavia	Jugoslovenska Radiodifuzija	JRD	1946	1950

=== Associated members ===
Associated members of the OIRT could be those radio and television organizations or groups of radio and television organizations that, although meeting all the conditions for active membership, could not be considered an organization or group of organizations representing their country as active members. They did not enjoy any of the social rights of active members, in particular the right to become members of the Administrative Council or the right to cast a decisive vote at sessions of the General Assembly. However, they could attend the sessions of this Assembly with an advisory vote and use the services provided by the OIRT.

In 1981, for the first time, cooperation was initiated with a non-socialist and commercial broadcasting organization, the Japanese television company Asahi National Broadcasting. She was accepted into the OIRT as an associate member. In 1983, another Japanese broadcaster, NHK, joined it. In 1988 and 1989, the Yugoslav JRT, the German public broadcasters ARD and ZDF joined the OIRT as associate members, followed by broadcasters from Austria (ORF), France (OFRT), Spain (CCRTV), and Italy (RAI). In 1989, television organizations from the Netherlands and Sweden also applied to join the OIRT as associate members, but due to the restructuring and dissolution of the organization, they did not have time to consider these applications. Despite intensive preparations for the reorganization, amendments to the Charter and a number of cooperation agreements concluded with the European Broadcasting Union, the OIRT has chosen the path of liquidation with further merger with the EBU since 1990.

Country	Broadcasting organization	Abbreviation	Joined	Withdrawn
West Germany	Arbeitsgemeinschaft der öffentlich-rechtlichen Rundfunkanstalten der Bundesrepublik Deutschland	ARD	1988	1992
West Germany	Zweites Deutsches Fernsehen	ZDF	1988	1992
Japan	TV Asahi	TELE-ASA	1981	1992
Japan	Nippon Hōsō Kyōkai	NHK	1983	1992
Yugoslavia	Jugoslovenska Radiotelevizija	JRT	1988	1992
Spain	Ràdio i Televisió Nacional de Catalunya	CCRTV	1988	1992
Italy	Radiotelevisione Italiana	RAI	1989	1992
Austria	Österreichischer Rundfunk	ORF	1989	1992
France	Organisme Français de Radiodiffusion et de Télévision (Note: The Organisme Français de Radiodiffusion et de Télévision (OFRT) is a special organization for the representation of French broadcasters in the European Broadcasting Union and other international broadcaster associations which was a member of the EBU since 1983.)	OFRT	1989	1992
