= Russian Universities =

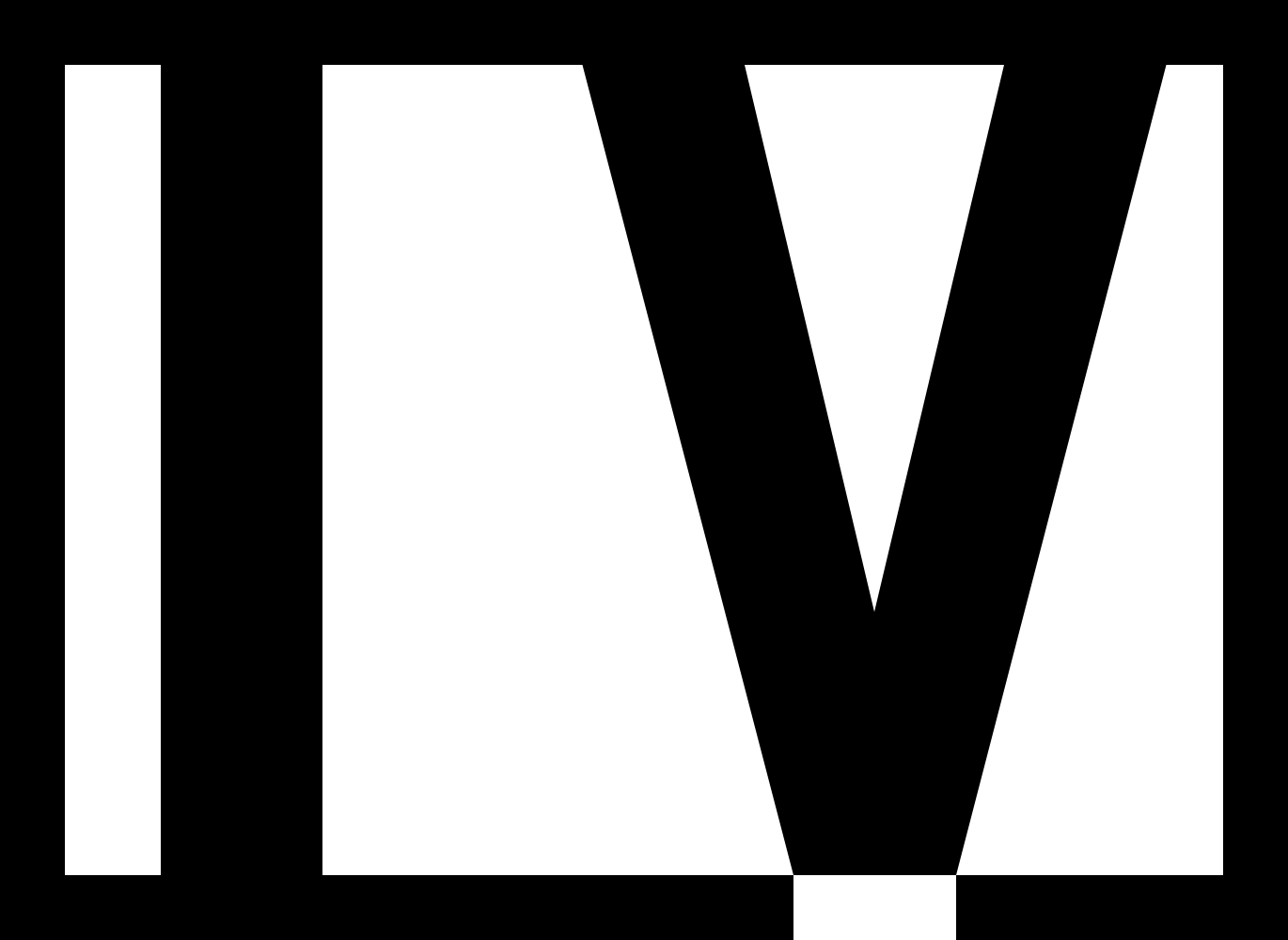
- Country: Russia
- Broadcast area: Nationwide
- Network: RGTRK Ostankino and VGTRK

Programming
- Language: Russian
- Picture format: SECAM (576i 4:3 SDTV)
- Timeshift service: Based on Orbita system

Ownership
- Owner: Government of Russia
- Sister channels: RTR

History
- Launched: 13 April 1992; 34 years ago, 9:00
- Replaced: Programme Four
- Closed: 10 November 1996; 29 years ago, 18:00
- Replaced by: NTV
- Former names: Educational Channel (13 April—31 May 1992)

Russian Universities (Российские университеты, Rossiyskie Universitety) was a Russian educational television channel that existed from 1992 to 1996.

It was initially Programme Four of Soviet Central Television, which, upon the dissolution of the USSR, was transferred to Channel 4 Ostankino (closed in 1994); while Russian Universities started broadcasting on a part-time basis on its frequencies from 1992 to 1996.

It was shut down on 10 November 1996, enabling NTV to expand its broadcasting hours.

== Background and history ==
The channel traced its history to the Programme Four which was established with the fiftieth anniversary of the Russian Revolution of 1917, focusing on literature, arts and culture.

In the early 1970s, the project of an educational and cultural channel was abandoned. At the time, it was restructured to a sport and entertainment format, with programming of several types, including reruns from Programme One, which occupied most of the schedule. In 1977, its coverage area increased, taking over the national transmitter network of Programme Two. At the end of 1978, it was available in 34 oblasts and nine republican capitals.

On 1 January 1982, Programme Four started a new format as an educational channel, broadcasting under this format on weekdays at night and on Saturdays throughout the day, sharing the format with Programme Two. It was subsequently renamed Educational Programme on 16 January 1988, while beginning to air programmes on Sundays.

On 27 December 1991, the liquidation process of the former Soviet radio and television broadcasting companies began, and using its base, the Ostankino State Television and Radio Broadcasting Company was created, taking effect from 1 January 1992. The Educational Channel began on 13 April 1992 and adopted the name Russian Universities on 1 June. On 9 January 1993, the channel was transferred to VGTRK, though it was given back to Ostankino on 2 April. It was decided to create the Russian Universities television company, the founders of which were proposed to be both television companies, but this company was never created, and on 22 November 1993, VGTRK became in charge of its productions.

=== Closure ===
On 20 September 1996, a presidential decree determined that, from November, its frequency network would be used entirely by NTV, effective 11 November 1996.

== Programming ==
Its output consisted of science and educational programmes, lectures, as well as documentaries, including documentaries produced by the channel, that were also shown in schools. The channel also had author programmes, fronted by Dimitriya Lihachyova, Aleksandra Panchenko, Yuriya Lotmana, Alexsandra Ankista and others.

In 1995—1996, it aired Formula 1 races, in 1995: qualifiers, in 1996, qualifiers and races, either as part of Hrono, or in full, in simulcast with RTR. Still in 1996, it aired one weekly match of the Russian Football Championship of 1996 (the other being on RTR). VGTRK’s own creative and production associations (TPO) were responsible for the production of programs: “Open World”, “Lad”, “Arena”, “Rost”, “Artel”.

In its last days, it aired programmes from RTR-Teleset and Meteor-Kino.

== Coverage area ==
Data as of the granting of Licence 500 on 2 December 1994.

Coverage area according to № 500
City	Frequency	Start date
Moscow	8 (VHF)	4 November 1967
St. Petersburg	33 (UHF)	13 January 1988
Cherkessk	6 (VHF)	1994/1995
Petrozavodsk	10 (VHF)	1992/1993
Krasnodar	38 (UHF)	1 June 1995
Stavropol	33 (UHF)	1994/1995
Vladimir	7 (VHF)	1988
Lipetsk	32 (UHF)	22 November 1993
Nizhny Novgorod	4 (VHF); 12 (VHF); 4 (VHF)	1 June 1988 — 6 October 1991 (Educational Programme); 7 October 1991 — 13 March 1993 (St. Petersburg TV); 14 March 1993 — 16 January 1994 (Channel 4 Ostankino; weekends)
Novgorod	9 (VHF)	1994
Rostov-na-Don	9 (VHF)	1988
Ryazan	28 (UHF)	1968
Saratov	30 (UHF)	18 December 1995
Smolensk	1 (VHF)	March 1992
Tambov	22 UHF	October 1993
Tula	30 VHF	1 November 1976
