= Nikolai Mesyatsev =

Soviet politician

- Николай Месяцев

Chairman of the State Committee of Television and Radio Broadcasting
- In office 30 October 1964 – 17 April 1970
- Preceded by: Mikhail Kharlamov
- Succeeded by: Sergey Lapin

Soviet ambassador to Australia
- In office 24 June 1970 – 14 July 1972
- Preceded by: Nikolai Tarakanov
- Succeeded by: Dmitry Musin

Member of the Supreme Soviet
- In office 1966–1970

Personal details
- Born: July 3, 1920 Volsk, Russian Empire
- Died: 3 September 2011 (aged 91) Moscow, Soviet Union
- Resting place: Troyekurovskoye Cemetery
- Citizenship: Soviet Union
- Party: CPSU
- Education: Red Army Military Law Academy
- Awards: Order of Honour; Order of the Patriotic War; Order of the Red Banner of Labour; Medal "For Battle Merit"; Medal "For the Defence of Moscow"; Medal "For the Capture of Königsberg"

Military service
- Allegiance: Soviet Union
- Branch/service: NKVD; Red Army
- Rank: Captain
- Unit: SMERSH; 5th Guards Tank Army

Nikolai Nikolayevich Mesyatsev (Russian: Николай Николаевич Месяцев) (July 3, 1920, Volsk, Saratov Governorate - September 3, 2011, Moscow) was a Soviet politician and statesman, chairman of the State Committee of Television and Radio Broadcasting of the Soviet Union from 1964-1970. From 1970-1972, he served as the Ambassador Extraordinary and Plenipotentiary of the Soviet Union to Australia. Member of the Communist Party of the Soviet Union between 1941-1972 and 1984-1991. Being member of the Communist Party of the Soviet Union, he was a candidate (alternate) member of the Central Committee of the Communist Party of the Soviet Union from 1966-1971 as well as deputy of the Supreme Soviet of the Soviet Union from 1966 to 1970.

== Biography ==
He was born into a large working-class family in Volsk, Saratov Governorate. His father was Nikolai Andreevich Mesyatsev (1872-1926), and his mother Anna Ivanovna Mesyatseva (1884-1943).

In 1926, the family moved to Moscow. In 1937, after finishing ten years of school, he entered the Moscow Law Institute. From the 3rd year, he transferred to the naval faculty of the Military Law Academy of the Red Army, which he graduated in September 1941.

In 1941-1945, he worked first in the 3rd Directorate of the People's Commissariat of the Navy of the Soviet Union, then in the Directorate of Special Departments of the NKVD and in the SMERSH Counterintelligence Department of the 5th Guards Tank Army: junior investigator, investigator, head of the investigative department. In 1945-1946, he worked in the Main Directorate of Counterintelligence "SMERSH".

In 1946-1947, first an instructor, then a responsible organizer of the Central Committee of the Komsomol. In 1948-1950, the second secretary of the Central Committee of the Komsomol of the Moldavian SSR. He recalled that Leonid Brezhnev, then the first secretary of the Central Committee of the Communist Party of Moldova, offered him to head the Komsomol of the republic, but Mesyatsev refused. In 1950-1952, he was deputy head of the organizational department of the Central Committee of the Komsomol.

In 1953, he was transferred to the state security agencies in order to conduct an audit of the investigation into the Viktor Abakumov case and the Doctors' plot. He was appointed assistant to the head of the investigative unit.

From 1952 to 1955 he studied at the postgraduate program of the Academy of Social Sciences under the Central Committee of the CPSU with the title candidate of legal sciences.

In 1955 he was the Head of the Propaganda and Agitation Department of the Central Committee of the Komsomol and in 1955-1959 he served as secretary of the Central Committee of the All-Union Leninist Young Communist League.

In 1959-1962 he served as First Deputy Chairman of the All-Union Society for the Dissemination of Political and Scientific Knowledge "Znanye".

In 1962-1963 he served as Minister-Counselor of the Soviet Embassy in the People's Republic of China.

In 1963-1964 he served as Deputy Head of the Department of the Central Committee of the CPSU for Relations with Communist and Workers' Parties of Socialist Countries (then headed by Yuri Andropov). He was a member of the Board of the Soviet-Chinese Friendship Society.

In 1964-1970 he was the Chairman of the State Committee of Television and Radio Broadcasting of the Soviet Union. He was involved in the construction of the Ostankino Technical Center. About 600 factories of the country participated in its construction and technical equipment. Three large residential buildings were built for the committee employees.

After the completion of the construction of the Ostankino Technical Center under his leadership, the concept of a single multi-program television and radio broadcasting with the supply of a television signal using space communications satellites to the regions of Siberia and the Russian Far East was developed and implemented. Mesyatsev did a lot to improve the quality of broadcasting for various strata and age groups of the population, and made efforts to develop feedback with viewers and listeners. In his work, he emphasized a creative approach and the content of the programs. He took direct part in the creation of a number of television and radio programs, in particular the 50-part film "Chronicle of Half a Century", "A Minute of Silence" (in memory of the fallen) and many others. Mesyatsev said that "My slogan was, Create without fear of mistakes. In the creative sphere, mistakes are impossible, but you shouldn't abuse the right to make mistakes either".

He was dismissed from his post by Leonid Brezhnev as a member of the Komsomol group of Alexander Shelepin.

From June 24, 1970 to July 14, 1972 he served as the Ambassador Extraordinary and Plenipotentiary of the Soviet Union to Australia.

In 1972 he was Ambassador of the Soviet Ministry of Foreign Affairs.

On August 1, 1972, he was expelled from the CPSU with the following wording: "For gross violation of party moral standards while serving as Ambassador Extraordinary and Plenipotentiary of the USSR to the Union of Australia and insincerity in considering a personal file." According to the memoirs of former TASS correspondent Boris Chekhnin, a rumor was spread by the KGB in Moscow: Mesyatsev was recalled for attempting to rape a visiting Soviet ballerina in a Sydney hotel. However, the real reason for the punishment, according to Chekhnin, was an accident - the death in a drunken traffic accident of a young employee of the KGB embassy residency Mikhail Tsukanov, the son of G. E. Tsukanov, an assistant to Leonid Brezhnev.

In 1972-1988 he was senior research fellow, and in 1988 head of the department of historical sciences of the Institute of Scientific Information on Social Sciences of the Soviet Academy of Sciences.

On May 18, 1984, under Konstantin Chernenko, he was reinstated in the ranks of the CPSU.

He was elected a member of the editorial boards of the magazines "Young Communist" and "Journalist", secretary of the Union of Journalists of the USSR, a member of the Committee for Lenin and State Prizes in Literature and Art, a member of the Presidium of the Trade Union of Cultural Workers.

He was elected as a member of the editorial boards of the magazines Molodoy Communist and Zhurnalist, secretary of the Union of Journalists of the USSR, member of the Committee for Lenin Prize and State Prizes in Literature and Art, member of the Presidium of the Trade Union of Cultural Workers.

Since December 1988 he was personal pensioner of union significance.

In 1995, he filed a lawsuit against Pavel Sudoplatov and his son Anatoly, accusing them of publishing slanderous information: a year earlier, the book "Special Assignments. Memoirs of an Unwanted Witness - Master of Soviet Espionage" was published, in which Mesyatsev was accused of conducting criminal interrogations and beating defendants and prisoners to death (including in the "doctors' case"). At the same time, no such information about Mesyatsev's participation in the "doctors' case" was found in the central archive of the Federal Counterintelligence Service.

He died on September 3, 2011 after a long and serious illness, in one of the Moscow hospitals.

He was buried at the Troyekurovskoye Cemetery. He was married to Alla Nikolaevna Mesyatseva (1923-1994) (died of a heart attack). Sons - Alexander (born 1948) and Alexey (born 1954); two grandsons (both Nikolai).
