= Sergey Lapin (diplomat) =

Soviet apparatchik, newspaper editor and diplomat

- Сергей Лапин
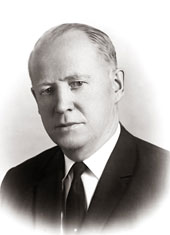

Chairman of the State Committee of Television and Radio Broadcasting
- In office 12 July 1970 – 16 December 1985
- Preceded by: Nikolai Mesyatsev
- Succeeded by: Aleksandr Aksyonov

Personal details
- Born: July 15, 1912 Saint Petersburg, Russian Empire
- Died: 4 October 1990 (aged 78) Moscow, Soviet Union
- Citizenship: Soviet Union
- Party: CPSU
- Education: Leningrad Historical Language Institute

Sergey Georgiyevich Lapin (Russian: Сергей Георгиевич Лапин; 15 July [O.S. 2 July] 1912 – 4 October 1990) was a Soviet apparatchik, newspaper editor and diplomat.

Lapin was born in Saint Petersburg. From 1930 to 1932 he studied at the Leningrad Historical Language Institute, and after graduating he went on to work in various positions, including deputy editor, of various Leningrad newspapers until 1940. From 1940 to 1942 he was a student at the Higher Party School of the All-Union Communist Party (bolsheviks).

From 1945 to 1953 he was Deputy Chairman of the Committee for Broadcasting, when in 1953 he began a career in diplomacy as Counsellor at the Embassy of the Soviet Union in East Germany. In 1955 he returned to Moscow to work in the European Department of the Ministry of Foreign Affairs, whilst also holding the position of Secretary of the CPSU at the MFA.

From 19 October 1956 until 16 June 1960 he was located in Vienna, as Ambassador of the Soviet Union to Austria, and then relocated back to Moscow as 1st Deputy Chairman of the USSR State Committee for Cultural Relations with Foreign Countries, whilst also holding the position of Ministry of Foreign Affairs of the Russian Soviet Federative Socialist Republic.

In 1962 he was promoted as Deputy Minister of Foreign Affairs of the USSR, and held this position until 6 April 1965. From 13 April 1965 until 12 April 1967 he was Ambassador of the Soviet Union to the People's Republic of China.

After the completion of his mission to Beijing, he returned once again to Moscow as Director-General of TASS, and held that position until 24 April 1970. For a short period of time, until 12 July 1970 he was Chairman of the Committee for Broadcasting, when he was appointed as Chairman of the State Committee for Television and Radiobroadcasting, and held this position until his retirement on 16 December 1985. Lapin was criticized for alleged antisemitism at the Central Television and Radio of the USSR. Many popular Soviet artists of Jewish descent, such as Nina Brodskaya, Emil Gorovets, Maya Kristalinskaya, Larisa Mondrus, Vadim Mulerman, and Aida Vedishcheva, met numerous obstacles in their careers. They were gradually banned from TV, their names were not making into movies' credits, they faced cancellation of concerts and prohibition of concert tours abroad, and tapes with their recordings on the radio were erased.

Lapin died in 1990 in Moscow.
