= Media of the Soviet Union =

Media of the Soviet Union includes:

- Broadcasting in the Soviet Union
  - Radio in the Soviet Union
  - Television in the Soviet Union
- Printed media in the Soviet Union
- Censorship in the Soviet Union
- Propaganda in the Soviet Union

== See also ==
- Media in Russia
