= Radio Rossii =

Russian radio station

Radio Rossii Радио России
- Moscow; Russia
- Frequencies: FM: 101.5 MHz (Moscow), 66.30 MHz (OIRT band) and 99.0 MHz (St. Petersburg); MW: 999 Khz (Grigoriopol); Cable radio: 1 Digital television: Radio 3 More than 1,500 other transmitters

Programming
- Language: Russian (Moscow)
- Format: News, talk, and music

Ownership
- Owner: VGTRK
- Sister stations: Radio Mayak, Radio Yunost, Vesti FM

History
- First air date: 10 December 1990; 35 years ago

Technical information
- Transmitter coordinates: 55°47′14.75″N 37°34′42.51″E

Links
- Webcast: icecast.vgtrk.cdnvideo.ru
- Website: https://smotrim.ru/radiorus

Radio Rossii (Russian: Радио России, Radio of Russia) is the primary public-radio station in Russia.

== History ==
Radio Rossii began broadcasting on 10 December 1990. The radio station is part of the state-owned unitary enterprise VGTRK, which also includes television channels Russia-1, Russia-2, Russia-24, Carousel, and Russia-K, as well as radio stations Yunost, Mayak, Kultura and Vesti FM. In 2015, the station's programme Encrypted in Music, created by composer Oleg Troyanovsky, won the Prix Italia award for Best Programme about Music Attracting a Broader Audience.

== Broadcast ==
Radio Rossii is classified as an information and light entertainment station. It is one of the state's information channels, meant to appeal to a wide audience with varying tastes. It's included in the first multiplex of digital TV broadcasting DVB-T2. Local state affiliates (GTRKs) broadcast regional programs on Radio Rossii.

== Distribution ==
Broadcasts in shortwave were terminated in the 2010s, medium wave in 2013-14 and longwave broadcasts were terminated on 9 January 2014.

With about 1,500 FM transmitters, Radio Rossii has the largest FM coverage in Russia. It remains the only station with widespread OIRT-FM coverage on (65.84-74.00 MHz). The OIRT band is only used in the CIS countries. In populated areas across Russia, Radio Rossii can be received both on OIRT and the standard FM band on (87.5-108 MHz), and streams are also available via satellite and the internet.

Since 5 April 2022, Radio Rossii broadcasts on mediumwave at 999 kHz, from 22:00 (of Moscow time) via a 1000 kW Grigoriopol transmitter, Transnistria. This transmitter is easily received in all of Europe, North Africa and parts of Asia.
