= 4th channel Ostankino =

Ostankino 4th Channel
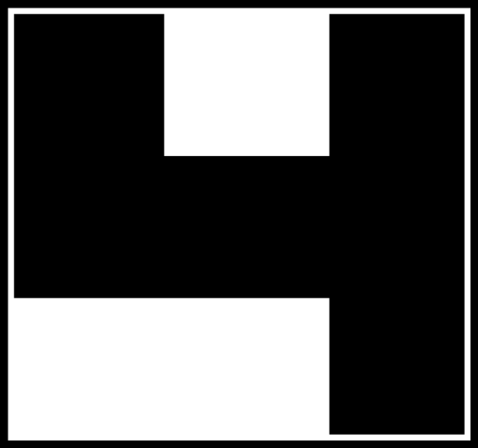
- Country: Russia
- Broadcast area: Nationwide
- Network: RGTRK Ostankino
- Headquarters: Ostankino Technical Center

Programming
- Language: Russian
- Picture format: SECAM (576i 4:3 SDTV)
- Timeshift service: Based on Orbita system

Ownership
- Owner: Government of Russia
- Sister channels: 1st channel Ostankino

History
- Launched: 13 April 1992; 34 years ago, 22:00
- Replaced: Programme Four
- Closed: 17 January 1994; 32 years ago, 1:00
- Replaced by: NTV

Ostankino 4th Channel (Russian: 4-й канал Останкино, romanized: 4-y kanal Ostankino) was a Russian state television channel. It was owned by the Russian government through the Ostankino State Television and Radio Broadcasting Company. It broadcast from 13 April 1992, to 17 January 1994. The editorial offices and studios of the television and radio company, from which it broadcast on Ostankino 4th Channel, were located in the Ostankino Technical Center.

== History ==
=== 1991–1992: Educational program of the Ostankino TV and Radio Company ===
On 27 December 1991, following the dissolution of the Soviet Union, the process of liquidation of the All-Union State Television and Radio Company was started, on its basis the Ostankino State Television and Radio Broadcasting Company was established, which began broadcasting on all its television and radio channels on 1 January 1992. A license for its broadcasting was never issued, and Ostankino 4th Channel was never registered as a mass media outlet. After the adoption of the regulations on the Ostankino State Television and Radio Broadcasting Company, the rights of the mass media were enjoyed by the television and radio company as a whole, and broadcasting was carried out on the basis of a decree of the Government of the Russian Federation. The existing directorate of programs of the Ostankino 4th Channel unlike the RGTRK Ostankino as a whole, ITA, thematic studios and creative associations of the television and radio company (which produced the few original programs and films of the channel), did not have the status of a legal entity.

Broadcasts were broadcast under the name "Educational Program". Programs began at 11:00, with a break around noon. The morning program consisted of a feature film and a concert program or a program about art. In some cases, entertainment programs, premieres or repeats of documentaries could be included. After the end of the broadcast break, programs resumed around 17:00 and ended before midnight. The weekday evening program during this period consisted of the premiere or repeat of a documentary film, a repeat of some youth or popular science program, as well as: programs and television films about art, concert programs and television concert films, cartoons, foreign language lessons (Italian, French, German, Spanish and English), repeats of feature films (mostly domestic, both one-part and multi-part mini-series). Sometimes on weekdays, sports broadcasts were also shown - for example, matches of the Russian Football Championship and the national team in this sport, both in full and in equal roles with the First Programme, as well as educational programs. The broadcast on weekends consisted of approximately the same, including repeats of children's Soviet television films.

=== 1992–1994: Ostankino 4th Channel ===
On 13 April 1992, the management of the morning, afternoon and early evening weekday schedule was transferred to VGTRK. On 1 June, the "Educational Program" changed its name to Russian Universities, but the programming policy, unlike the name of the channel, did not change at first - all the previous programs, including programs for children, foreign language lessons and other educational programs, Soviet feature and television films continued to be included in the schedule. Only some programs of a musical or entertainment nature and sports broadcasts that did not fit into the broadcast schedule of the main RTR channel became an addition. Management of the late evening weekday program and the program for weekends and holidays was left to RGTR "Ostankino", whose evening block of programs on weekdays began at 22:00, after the end of the Russian Universities programs. The evening block consisted mainly of showing one feature film, while anything other than films was shown in smaller quantities or might be absent altogether. The showing of some documentary television films and all cartoons, repeats of youth and popular science programs, and experimental programs were transferred from the weekday program to the weekend program, which was entirely under the control of RGTRK Ostankino. Broadcasting on weekends began at 9:00, with rare exceptions. Foreign language lessons were not included in the program schedule for these days. RGTRK Ostankino broadcast its entire airtime under the name Ostankino 4th Channel with a corresponding logo in the form of a stylized Arabic numeral "4" in a frame, in the lower right corner of the screen.

The holiday and weekend program began to include more entertainment programs, in the release of which the ATV television company ("Author's Television", "New Studio") was involved. The president of ATV received the position of general director of Ostankino 4th Channel. The initiative for such changes belonged to the then chairman of the television and radio company, Yegor Yakovlev, who proposed to the ATV team to rehabilitate Ostankino 4th Channel, which was then a "television garbage dump of repeats and moldy educational programs".

Since 17 January 1994, the evening broadcast on Ostankino 4th Channel was transferred from RGTRK Ostankino to NTV channel, and the morning and daytime broadcasts to VGTRK (Russian Universities TV channel). The channel's broadcasting was completely stopped. Some of the programs of the former Ostankino 4th Channel until 29 August 1997 ("Vremechko" and "Tretii glaz", previously also "Voskresenie s Dmitriyem Dibrovym") continued to be produced by ATV for the NTV channel, until they were replaced by similar programs of NTV's own production.
