= International Broadcasting Union =

Alliance of European radio broadcasters (1925–1950)

International Broadcasting Union Union Internationale de Radiophonie
- Successor: European Broadcasting Union; International Radio and Television Organisation
- Established: 4 April 1925; 100 years ago
- Dissolved: 1 November 1950; 75 years ago
- Type: Union of broadcasting organisations
- Headquarters: Geneva, Switzerland

The International Broadcasting Union (IBU; official name in French: Union Internationale de Radiophonie, UIR, modern translations in French: Union Internationale de Radiodiffusion/Union internationale de radio-télévision, UIR) was an alliance of European radio broadcasters, established on 3–4 April 1925. The union had its headquarters in Geneva. The UIR aimed to resolve international problems of broadcasting.

== History ==
Since its establishment in 1865, the International Telegraph Union (ITU) focused on wireless point-to-point communications. After the end of World War I, the ITU did not take up the new development of radio broadcasting. The League of Nations and ITU decided not to create international broadcasting regulations as the technology was too "young" and changing too quickly. The decision left room for international efforts that were not driven by governments.

European broadcasters took the initiative, discussing how to deal with national and international problems of broadcasting, and whether the private companies should seek government regulation or establish their own international organization of broadcasters working outside governments. Lengthy negotiations between the various private broadcasters and the British BBC culminated in establishing of the non-governmental International Broadcasting Union.

The diverse and complex problems of a growing number of broadcasting stations in Europe required expert knowledge in law, finance, engineering, journalism, and musicology. The experts argued that their efforts would improve the quality of broadcasting to such a degree that the medium would attract a wider radio audience. Their reasoning proved correct. In 1920, only a few thousand homes in Europe had radio receivers, in 1926 this number grew to 5.8 million and in 1931 to 16 million receivers.

In 1940, the UIR equipment was evacuated from Brussels to Switzerland, but in 1941 was returned after German request, and was later used by the Wehrmacht to monitor radio activity of Allied forces. Thirteen member countries stopped cooperating with the UIR after it went under German control.

After the end of World War II the UIR was discredited as "German-friendly" in the eyes of many former member states. In March 1946, the Soviet Union demanded dissolution of UIR and establishment of a new international broadcasting organization, where all the satellite states of the USSR would be represented with voting rights. 26 members of UIR founded the alternative International Broadcasting Organisation commonly known as OIR on 28 June 1946.

The dispute escalated when the ITU world radio conference was held in 1947 in Atlantic City. Both organizations, the OIR and the UIR, demanded to participate at this meeting as "technical experts". Both organizations were denied this status, instead being allowed only to participate as observers without voting rights. The European follow-up conference in Copenhagen in 1948 had similar outcome. This situation did not satisfy either party.

The BBC was not eager to join a new association which was likely to be dominated by the Soviet Union. Moreover, the USSR enrolled some of its member republics as independent states, giving the USSR eight votes in the new organization. France intended to do the same for its North African colonies, which would give it four votes. The United Kingdom would have had only one.

In 1949, France, the Netherlands, Italy and Belgium declared their intention to resign from the OIR. Many Western European countries decided to form a completely new organization despite a mistrust of the United Kingdom – in the opinion of some, the BBC wanted to dominate the new organization.

UIR was officially dissolved in 1950, and its remaining assets were transferred to a newly established European Broadcasting Union (EBU).

On 1 January 1993, OIR, at that time renamed to OIRT, merged with the EBU.

== See also ==
- World Broadcasting Unions
