= Radio Moscow =

Soviet international broadcasting station

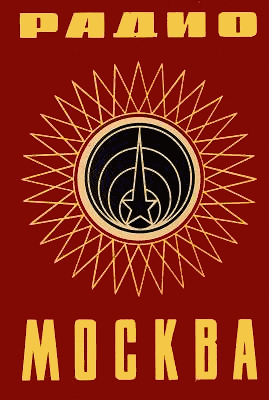
- Radio Moscow QSL card of 1969
- Type: Radio network
- Country: Soviet Union

History
- Launch date: 29 October 1929; 96 years ago
- Closed: 22 December 1993; 32 years ago
- Replaced by: Voice of Russia

Coverage
- Availability: International

Radio Moscow (Russian: Pадио Москва, romanized: Radio Moskva), also known as Radio Moscow World Service, was the official international broadcasting station of the Union of Soviet Socialist Republics until 1993, when it was reorganized into Voice of Russia, which was subsequently reorganized and renamed into Radio Sputnik in 2014. At its peak, Radio Moscow broadcast in over 70 languages using transmitters in the Soviet Union, Eastern Europe, and Cuba.

Radio Moscow's interval signal was "Wide Is My Motherland" (Russian: Широка страна моя родная, romanized: Shiroka strana moya rodnaya). Moscow Nights was the station's signature tune since its relaunch as the Radio Moscow World Service in 1978.

== History ==
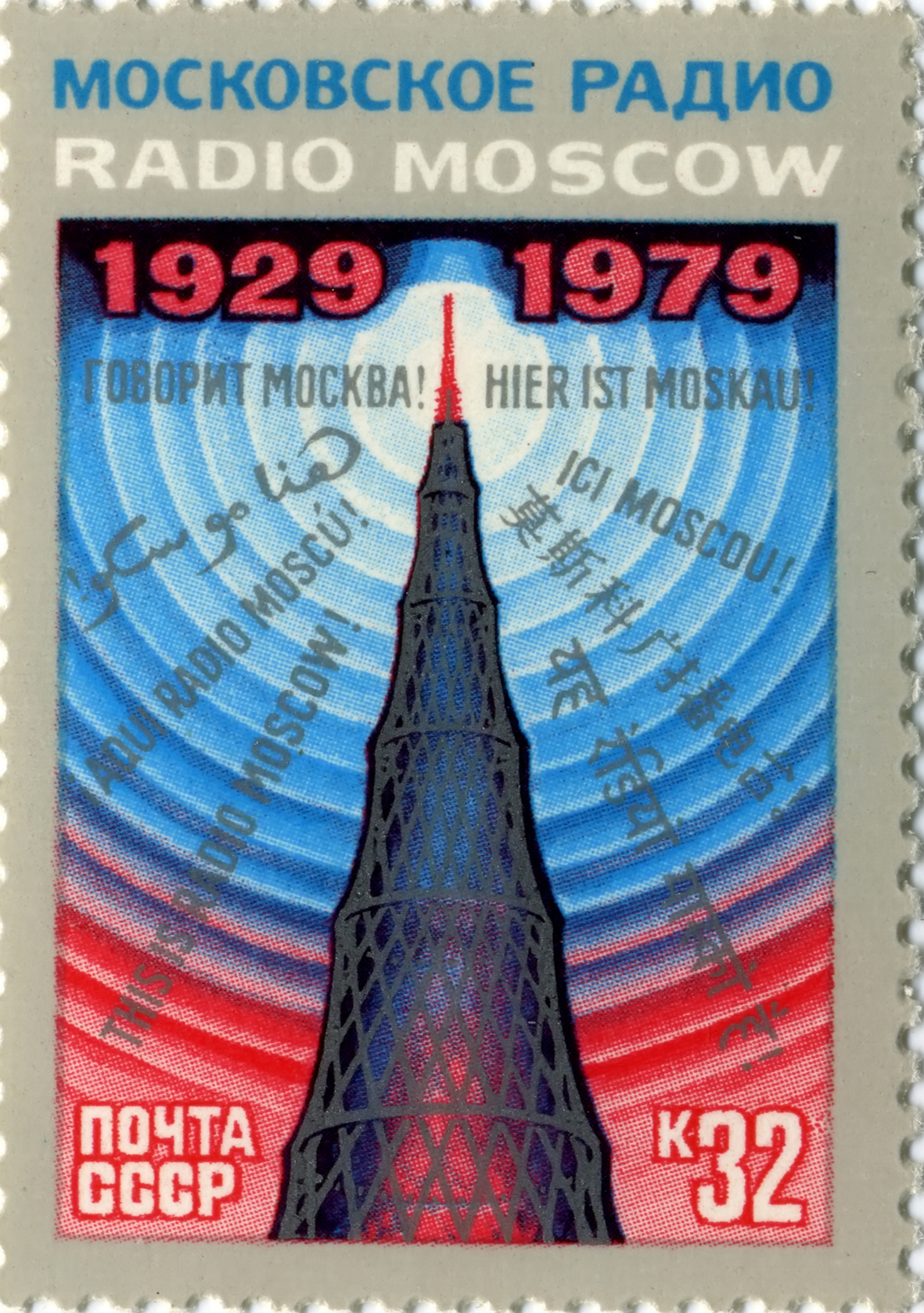
Stamp of 1979

Radio Moscow pennant from late 1980s

=== Early years ===
Radio Moscow's first foreign language broadcast was in German on 29 October 1929; English and French services soon followed. Previously, Radio Moscow broadcast in 1922 with a transmitter station RV-1 in the Moscow region, and a second broadcasting centre came on air at Leningrad in 1925. By 1939, Radio Moscow was broadcasting (on mediumwave and shortwave) in English, French, Indonesian, German, Italian and Arabic. During the 1930s, Radio Moscow expressed concern about Nazi Germany and its dictator Adolf Hitler, while its Italian mediumwave service was jammed under the orders of Italy's Fascist dictator Benito Mussolini during the late 1930s.

During World War II, Radio Moscow operated an effective international service to Germany and occupied Europe.

=== The Cold War years ===
The United States was first targeted by Radio Moscow during the early 1950s, with transmitters in the Moscow region. Later Western North America was targeted by the newly constructed Vladivostok and Magadan relay stations.

The first broadcasts to Africa went on the air in the late 1950s in English and French.

In 1961, Radio Moscow for the first time began to transmit broadcasts in three African languages: Amharic, Swahili and Hausa. Over time, speakers of another eight African languages were able to listen to services from Radio Moscow.

The first centralized news bulletin went on the air in August 1963 and reached out to listeners all over the world. In the years of the Cold War, most news reports and commentaries focused on the relations between the United States and Soviet Union.

In the 1970s, Radio Moscow's commentators broadcast in the "News and Views" program. The participants were Viktor Glazunov, Leonid Rassadin, Yuri Shalygin, Alexander Kushnir, Yuri Solton and Vladislav Chernukha.

=== Changes late 1970s–1980s ===
A sample of a Radio Moscow "Listeners' Request Club" shortwave broadcast from the late 1980s.

In the late 1970s, the English language service was renamed Radio Moscow World Service. The project was launched and supervised by a long-time Radio Moscow journalist and manager Alexander Evstafiev. Later, North American, African and British Isles services (all in English) operated for a few hours per day alongside the regular (24 Hour) English World Service.

At one time in 1980, Radio Moscow had transmissions on the Medium Wave broadcast on 600 kHz (later 1040 kHz) from Havana, Cuba which reached the Caribbean islands and US State of Florida.

One programme on air in the 1980s with an informal presentation, in contrast to most other shows, was the Listeners' Request Club, hosted by radio presenter Vasily Strelnikov. Another feature on Radio Moscow was Moscow Mailbag, which answered listeners' questions in English about the Soviet Union. From 1957, the programme was presented by Joe Adamov.

=== Closure ===
On 22 December 1993, the Russian president Boris Yeltsin issued a decree which reorganized Radio Moscow with a new name: Voice of Russia.

== Languages ==
=== Languages of Radio Moscow ===
By 1931, when Radio Moscow came under the control of the newly established Gosteleradio, the service comprised eight languages: English, French, German, Czech, Hungarian, Italian, Spanish, Swedish.

By the 1970s there were 64 languages:

- English (World Service and regional services), French (to Europe and Africa), Portuguese and Spanish (to Europe and Latin America), Arabic (to North Africa and Near/Middle East)
- 19 languages to Europe: Albanian, Bulgarian, Catalan, Czech, Danish, Dutch, Finnish, German, Greek, Hungarian, Italian, Macedonian, Norwegian, Polish, Romanian, Serbo-Croat, Slovak, Slovene, Swedish
- 11 languages to Africa: Amharic, Bambara, Fula, Hausa, Lingala, Malagasy, Ndebele, Shona, Somali, Swahili, Zulu
- 28 languages to Asia: Assamese, Bengali, Burmese, Cambodian, Chinese, Dari, Gujarati, Hindi, Indonesian, Japanese, Kannada, Korean, Laotian, Malayalam, Marathi, Mongolian, Nepali, Oriya, Persian, Punjabi, Pashto, Sinhalese, Tamil, Telugu, Thai, Turkish, Urdu, Vietnamese
- 1 language to Latin America: Quechua

In 1989 Russian, Malay and Tagalog were added.

=== Complementing services ===
==== Radio Peace and Progress ====
- Languages offered by both Radio Peace and Progress (RPP) and Radio Moscow: Arabic, Chinese, English, French, German, Mongolian, Persian, Portuguese, Spanish.
- Languages covered by RPP, but not by Radio Moscow: Azerbaijani, Creole, Guarani, Hebrew, Yiddish.

==== The union republics ====
In 10 of the 14 union republics besides the RSFSR there were foreign broadcasting services.

- Radio Tallinn: Estonian, Finnish, Swedish
- Radio Riga: Latvian, Swedish
- Radio Vilnius: English, Lithuanian
- Radio Minsk: Belarusian, German
- Radio Kiev: English, German, Ukrainian
- Radio Tbilisi: Abkhazian, Georgian
- Radio Yerevan: Arabic, Armenian, English, French, Kurdish, Spanish
- Radio Baku: Arabic, Azerbaijani, Persian, Turkish
- Radio Tashkent: Arabic, Dari, English, Hindi, Persian, Urdu, Uzbek
- Radio Dushanbe: Dari, Persian, Tajik

==== Russian language services ====
Until 1988, there was no Russian service of Radio Moscow. Instead there were several other services for Russians abroad like the Fifth programme of the All-Union Radio (since 1960), Radio Motherland (Радиостанция Родина) of the Soviet Committee for Cultural Relations with Fellow-Countrymen Abroad or for fishermen Radio Pacific Ocean (Радиостанция Тихий Океан, 1963–2001) from Vladivostok and Radio Atlantic (Радиостанция Атлантика, 1965–2004) from Murmansk. The First All-Union Radio Programme and Radio Mayak were also relayed on shortwave.

== USSR Shortwave broadcasting innovations ==
The USSR pioneered the use of HRS 8/8/1 antennas (horizontal dipole curtain, eight columns, eight rows, with electrically steerable pattern) for highly targeted shortwave broadcasting long before HRS 12/6/1 technology became available in the west. HRS 8/8/1 curtain arrays create a 10-degree beam of shortwave energy, and can provide a highly audible signal to a target area some 7,000 km away.

== See also ==
- Eastern Bloc information dissemination
- Radio Wolga - radio station for Soviet Soldiers in former East Germany, until 1990.
- Radio Peace and Progress
