= Vesti FM =

Russian radio station

Vesti FM Вести ФМ
- Moscow; Russia
- Frequencies: FM: 97.6 MHz (Moscow), 89.3 MHz (St. Petersburg); MW: 1413 kHz (Grigoriopol); Digital television: Radio 1

Programming
- Language: Russian
- Format: News

Ownership
- Owner: VGTRK
- Sister stations: Radio Rossii, Radio Mayak, Radio Yunost

History
- First air date: 5 February 2008; 18 years ago

Links
- Webcast: http://vestifm.com
- Website: http://vestifm.com

Vesti FM (Russian: Вести ФМ, News FM) is a Russian national radio station owned and operated by VGTRK. The station's manager is Ekaterina Shchekina.

Operating throughout Russia, the station broadcasts on FM and MW and it, along with Radio Rossii and Radio Mayak, is also included in the first multiplex of digital television in Russia using DVB-T2 technology.

== History ==
The station began broadcasting on 5 February 2008 at 6:00 in Moscow on 97.6 MHz. Initially broadcasting in Moscow and St. Petersburg, it now broadcasts to more than sixty regions in Russia.

== Transmitters ==
At the end of the 1960s, the USSR began to build a powerful transmitter site for the broadcasting soft propaganda to Western countries in Grigoriupol in the Maiac region of Transnistria. The de facto Transnistrian government sold the facility to the Russian state media company RIA Novosti in 2007, and the Russian government mandated that Vesti FM be transmitted over Grigoriupol's powerful medium-wave transmitters.

Vesti FM started broadcasting on 1413 kHz with a transmitter power of 500 kW from 2014, prior to the beginning of the Russo-Ukrainian War. The transmitter thus reached not only all of Ukraine, but also a substantial portion of Europe.

On 26 April 2022, one of the multiple antenna systems of Vesti FM was blown up by unknown perpetrators, as part of the wider Transnistria attacks. However, the mediumwave station at 1413 kHz continued to operate.

== Controversies ==
In June 2017, television and radio journalist Vladimir Solovyov ignited controversy, after he called, in his radio program, the participants in that year's protests "the eternal two percent of shit", the "children of corrupt officials" and "majoritarian imbeciles". Solovyov also stated that if not for the police, "the people [the counter-protesters] would simply tear them to pieces", a statement which was criticized by protesters and journalist Alexander Nevzorov. Similar remarks by Solovyov continue to be made against opposition journalists and some audience members.

== See also ==
- Vesti (VGTRK)
