= Ostankino (broadcaster) =

Russian State TV and Radio Company «Ostankino»
- Type: Broadcast
- Country: Russia
- Availability: Free-to-air
- Founded: 27 December 1991; 34 years ago
- TV stations: 1st channel Ostankino; Moscow Programme; 4th channel Ostankino
- Radio stations: Radio-1; Mayak; Yunost; Orfey
- Launch date: 1 January 1992; 34 years ago
- Dissolved: 22 April 2004; 22 years ago
- Language: Russian
- Replaced: All-Union State TV and Radio Company (Soviet Central Television & All-Union Radio)
- Replaced by: ORT (Early 1 April 1995); RMTRK «Moscow» (Early 1 July 1992); NTV (Early 17 January 1994); Radio-1 (Early 16 May 1996)

Russian State TV and Radio Company «Ostankino» (Russian: Российская государственная телерадиокомпания «Останкино») was the state broadcasting organization that managed part of the state television and radio broadcasting in Russia from 27 December 1991, to 12 October 1995.

== History ==
According to a Kommersant article dated 29 April 1995, "In the fall of 1992, a commercial directorate was created at Ostankino (ORT), which demanded that the studios enter into contracts with advertisers. The studio directors began to report not to the editor-in-chief of the TV company, but to the commercial one. At the same time, the concept of "currency advertising" ($5000 per minute) was introduced. This only increased the income to the television company's shadow fund, since the studio took money from currency advertisers as from ruble advertisers, but for this service it was necessary to pay extra in cash. The then commercial director of "Ostankino" Nikolai Chernonog did not like this at all, but he was not able to control the situation. It did not change even after accredited advertising agencies appeared at the television company: Premier SV, "Blik Communications", "Aurora", "Lot" and the Mikhail Lesin associated Video International, since television officials still asked "in the pocket" for placing advertising in their studio's program.

At the same time, independent television companies (ViD, RenTV and ATV), which appeared in late 1991 and early 1992, got involved in the television business. Ostankino now had to buy their programs, which were popular with viewers. The price of one program fluctuated between $15 and $30 thousand. In addition, the television technical center (TTC) was separated from Ostankino, and all editorial offices were forced to pay it for equipment rental (State Duma deputy Igor Yakovenko, who investigated the creation of ORT, thinks that this step led to the collapse of Ostankino). They also had to spend money on purchasing feature films. The television company's expenses grew faster than its income, and Ostankino was catastrophically short of state budget subsidies. Then the television company stopped paying the Ministry of Communications for the signal.

Thus, by the end of 1992, television became a place where big money was made. The shadow income of Ostankino was no less than the income of advertising agencies and independent television companies. The salaries of journalists were so low that even under the threat of dismissal they did not refuse to shoot commissioned stories. Control over the first channel by the state became a formality. In fact, it was controlled by commercial structures. The principle was as follows: he who pays the piper calls the tune. This was probably what was called the crisis of the Ostankino television company.

In 1993, the advertising market was essentially divided between Premier SV and Video International. Premier controlled the first, fifth and sixth channels, Video International controlled the second, third and fourth. Among the independent television companies, the most popular programs were ViDa, in which the advertising agency InterVid placed. As a result, ViD got rich: its CEO Alexander Lyubimov took 16th place in the list of the richest people from the former USSR, which was compiled by the Austrian magazine Option in late 1992 and published in the business magazine Most in February 1993. Most called Alexander Lyubimov the first television magnate. Vladislav Listyev was not on this list.

According to «Блеск и нищета российского ТВ» ("The Splendor and Poverty of Russian TV"), only $87 million or $187 billion rubles out of $82.5 billion was received from advertising at ORT which led to its insolvency.

Vladislav Listyev headed ORT until his death on 1 March 1995.

== Services ==
=== TV channels ===
- 1st channel Ostankino (27 December 1991—31 March 1995)
- Moscow Programme (27 December 1991—30 June 1992)
- Educational programme/4th channel Ostankino (27 December 1991—16 January 1994)

=== Radio stations ===
- Radio-1 (27 December 1991—16 May 1996)
- Radio Mayak (27 December 1991—8 August 1994)
- Radio Yunost (27 December 1991—16 May 1996)
- Radio Orfey (27 December 1991—7 June 1996)

== See also ==
- Boris Berezovsky
- Mikhail Lesin
- Alexander Lyubimov
- VIDgital
- Video International
