= Victor Tatarskiy =

Russian radio and television presenter (1939–2022)

- Born: 17 November 1939; Leningrad, RSFSR, USSR
- Died: 27 February 2022 (aged 82); Moscow, Russia
- Occupations: Radio and television presenter
- Years active: 1967–2022

Victor Tatarskiy (17 November 1939 – 27 February 2022) was a Russian radio and television presenter. He was honored as the Honored Artist of the RSFSR (1988) and as the People's Artist of the Russian Federation (2012).

== Life and career ==
Tatarskiy graduated from the Mikhail Shchepkin Higher Theatre School. Since 1967, he has continuously hosted the radio program "Meeting with the Song", the author of which was at the same time. He also hosted the radio programs "Musical Globe" (1967–1997), "Record on your tape recorders" (1970–1972) and "At all latitudes" (1973–1976).

Since 1993, he led the Starry Hour program at the Slavianski Bazaar in Vitebsk. From 1996 to 2003, he hosted the television program "The History of a Masterpiece" on ORT.

He participated in the dubbing into Russian of some feature films.

He was member of the jury of the National Radio Award (Media Union).

Tatarsky died in February 2022, at the age of 82.
