= Radio Orpheus =

Radio Orpheus Радио Орфей
- Moscow; Russia
- Broadcast area: Russia
- Frequency: FM 99.2 (in Moscow)

Programming
- Language: Russian
- Format: Classical music

Ownership
- Owner: Russian State Music Television and Radio Broadcasting Center

History
- First air date: 1 August 1960; 66 years ago
- Former names: Fourth Program

Links
- Webcast: Yes
- Website: orpheusradio.ru

Radio Orfey (Russian: Радио Орфей) ("Radio Orpheus") is a Russian radio station broadcasting classical music from studios in Moscow. Its programmes – which are broadcast on FM from transmitters in Moscow (99.2 MHz), Saint Petersburg (97.6 MHz), Yekaterinburg (69.92 MHz), Volgograd (87.5 MHz), Perm (93.5 MHz), Lipetsk (96.1 MHz), Tula (92.1 MHz), Kurgan (106.0 MHz), and Smolensk (104.3 MHz) – are also streamed on the Internet.

== History ==
it was launched by the State Committee of Television and Radio Broadcasting of the Soviet Union on ultra-short waves (VHF) on 1 August 1960 as the "Fourth Program" of the All-Union Radio. On 1 January 1991, it was renamed "Radio Orpheus". From 27 December 1991, it was part of the State Television and Radio Broadcasting Company "Ostankino". The founder and first general director of the radio station was Olga Gromova, who headed the radio station until December 2002.

On 8 June 1996, the State Institution RS "Orpheus" was created, which took over the frequency of the former radio station of the same name. On 27 June 1998, it was included in the All-Russian State Television and Radio Broadcasting Company. On 9 September 2002, it was removed from VGTRK and merged with the Russian State Music Television and Radio Broadcasting Center.
