= Grigoriopol transmitter =

Broadcasting facility in Maiac, Moldova (Transnistria)

Coordinates: 47°16′54″N 29°25′22″E

The Grigoriopol transmitter (Russian: Приднестровский радиотелецентр, romanized: Pridniestrovsky radioteletsentr), officially the Transnistrian Radio and Television Center, is a very large broadcasting facility situated near Maiac, an urban settlement 11 km (6.8 mi) northeast of Grigoriopol, Transnistria (Moldova).

== History ==
At the end of the 1960s, the Soviet Union began building a powerful radio broadcasting station for propaganda to Western countries in Grigoriupol. Construction work on this facility with an area of 950 hectares (3 3/4 mi^{2}), which hoisted at the beginning of the 1990s over 20 transmitters working in the short- and mediumwave range, took place between 1968 and 1975. The antennas consisted of several systems for shortwave with heights between 60 and 160 metres (200 and 520 ft) and a large rotatable shortwave antenna, which could focus its radiation to every point on Earth. After the collapse of the Soviet Union, its transmitters were used by several foreign broadcasting companies, mainly the missionary organization Trans World Radio. In 1997 several antennas were destroyed or damaged by excessive icing. The largest loss was a 350-metre-tall (1,150 ft) guyed mast and a 250-metre-tall (820 ft) mast used for mediumwave broadcasting.

The de facto Transnistrian authorities sold the facility to the Russian state media company RIA Novosti in 2007. The Russian Federation mandated the Moscow-based pro-government broadcasting network Vesti FM to also broadcast over Grigoriupol's powerful medium-wave transmitters. Moscow based Vesti FM started broadcasting on 1413 kHz with 500 kW power from 2014, just before the start of the Ukraine crisis. The programme thus reached not only the entire Ukraine, but also a large part of the rest of Europe.

As of 2021, it was being used as a medium wave transmitter for Vesti FM on 1413 kHz with 500 kW and Trans World Radio on 999 kHz (500 kW) and 1548 kHz (1000 kW), as well for shortwave transmissions on 9940, 11805, 11530 and 11570 kHz for TWR mostly.

Multiple antennas were destroyed in the course of two blasts on early morning of 26 April 2022. The first at 06:40 and the second at 07:05 local time. As of 09:00, the two most powerful transmitter-antennas were out of service: one a 1000 kW and the other a 500 kW system. Both were transmitting Russian state radio, most likely Vesti FM on 1413 kHz. Responsibility for the attack was not immediately clear. Some media reported, they may have been a false flag operation by Russia or Transnistria itself. These explosions were part of a series of attacks that struck Transnistria in 2022 while the Russian invasion of Ukraine was taking place.

Since April 5, 2022 Radio Rossii transmits on 999 kHz with 1000 kW instead of Trans World Radio, which instead transmits on 621 kHz with a power of 150 kW. The mediumwave frequency 1548 kHz allocated by TWR is still in service.

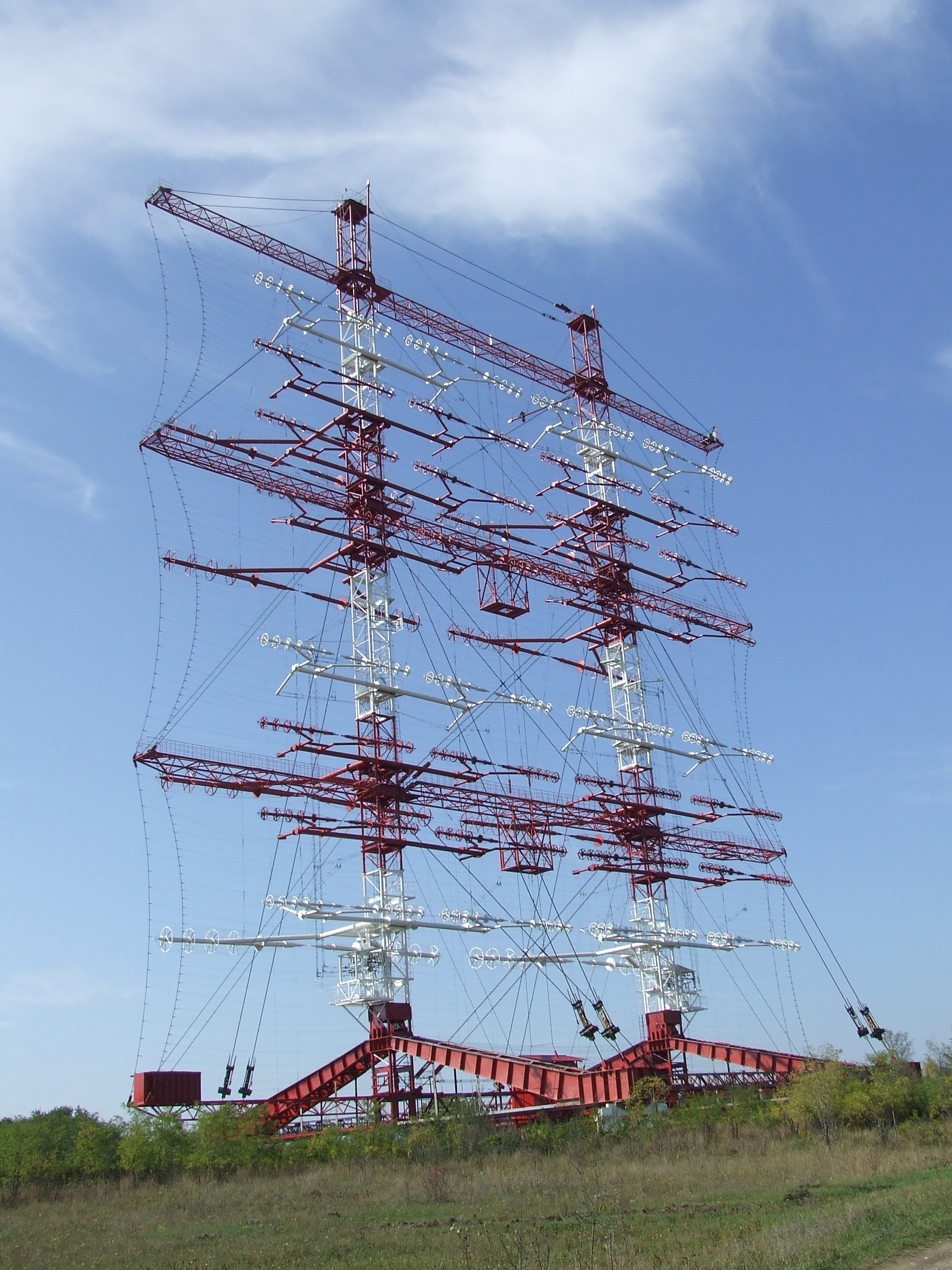

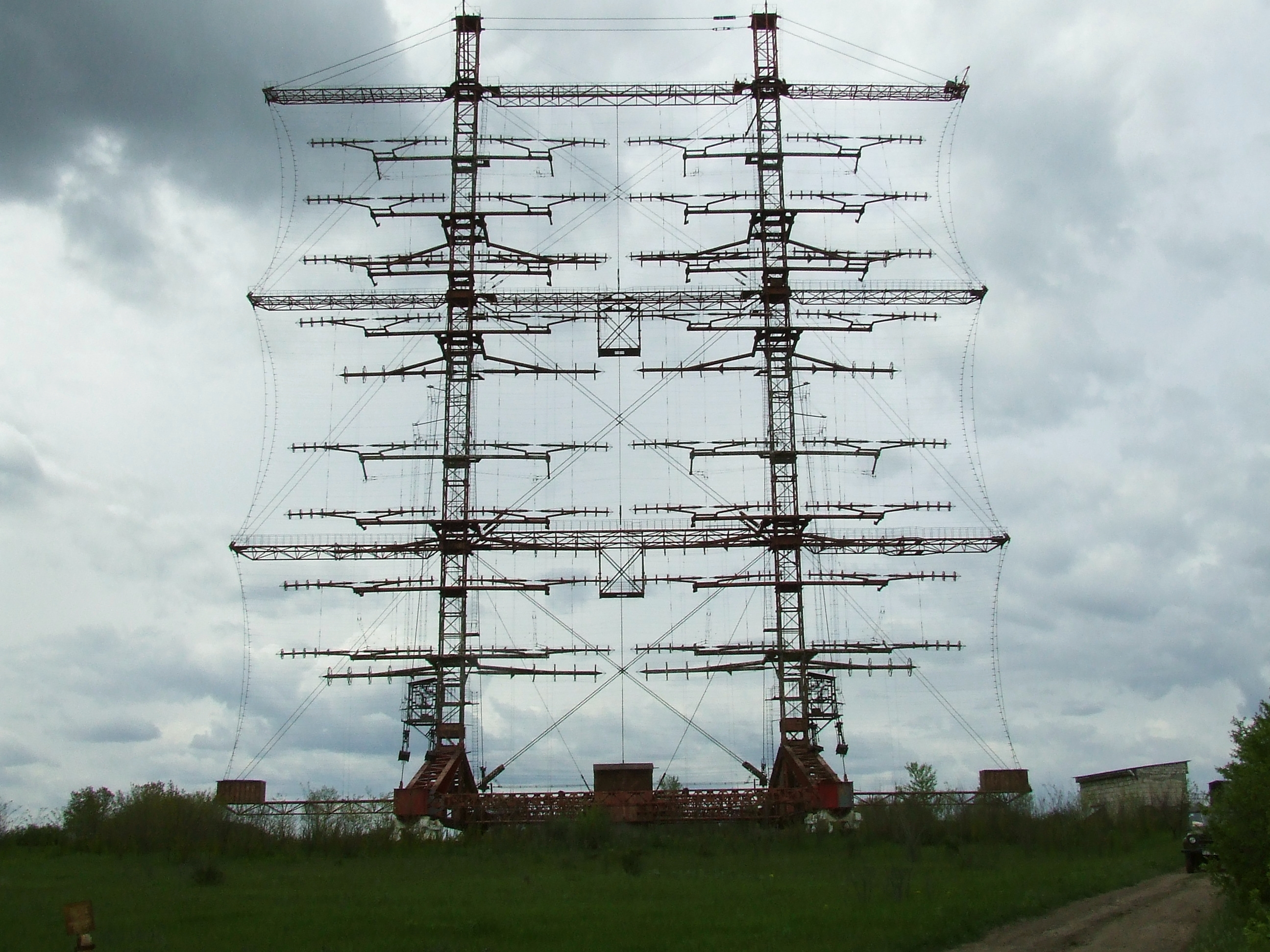
Shortwave rotating antenna (1 MW)

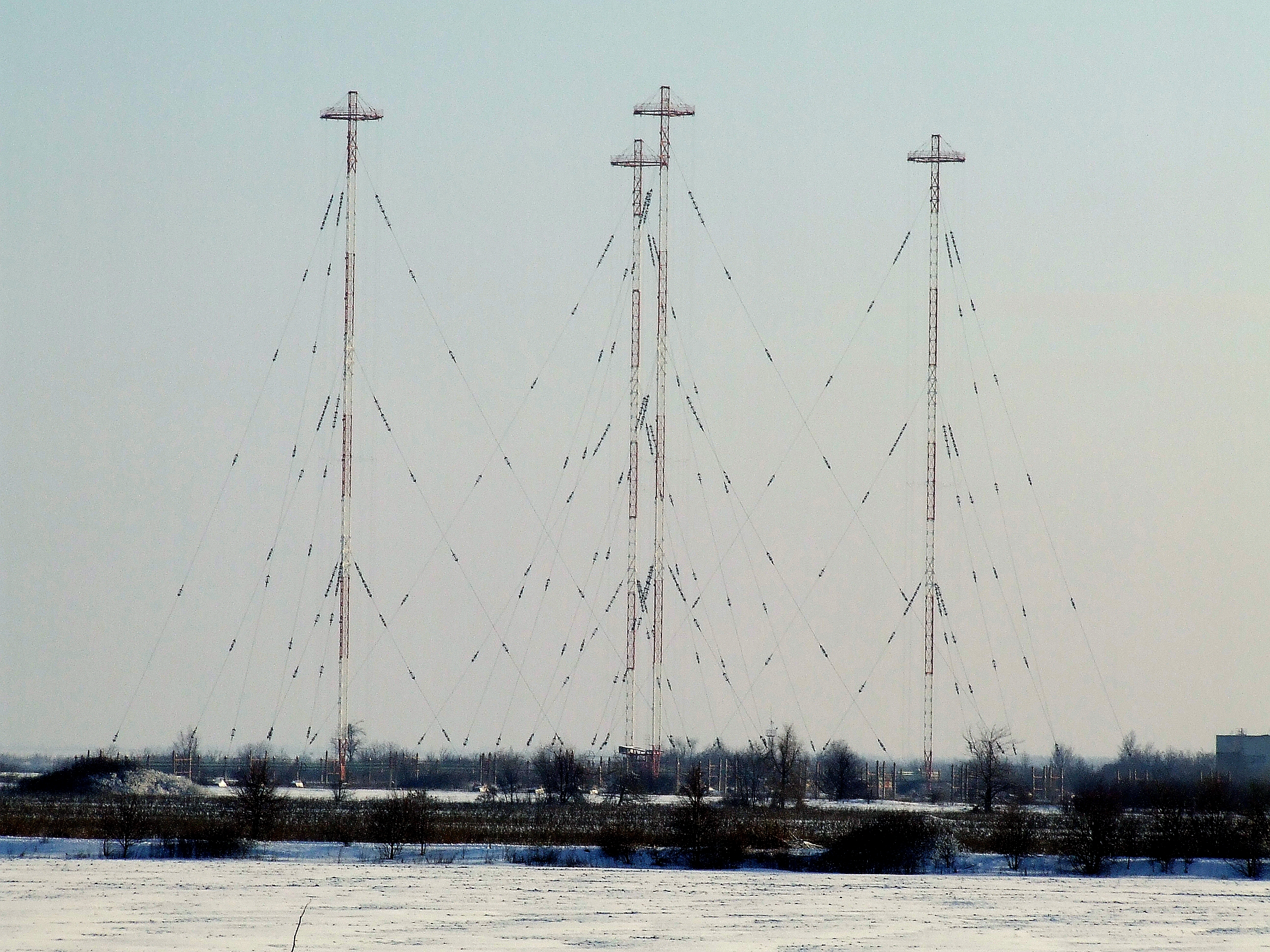
Medium wave antenna

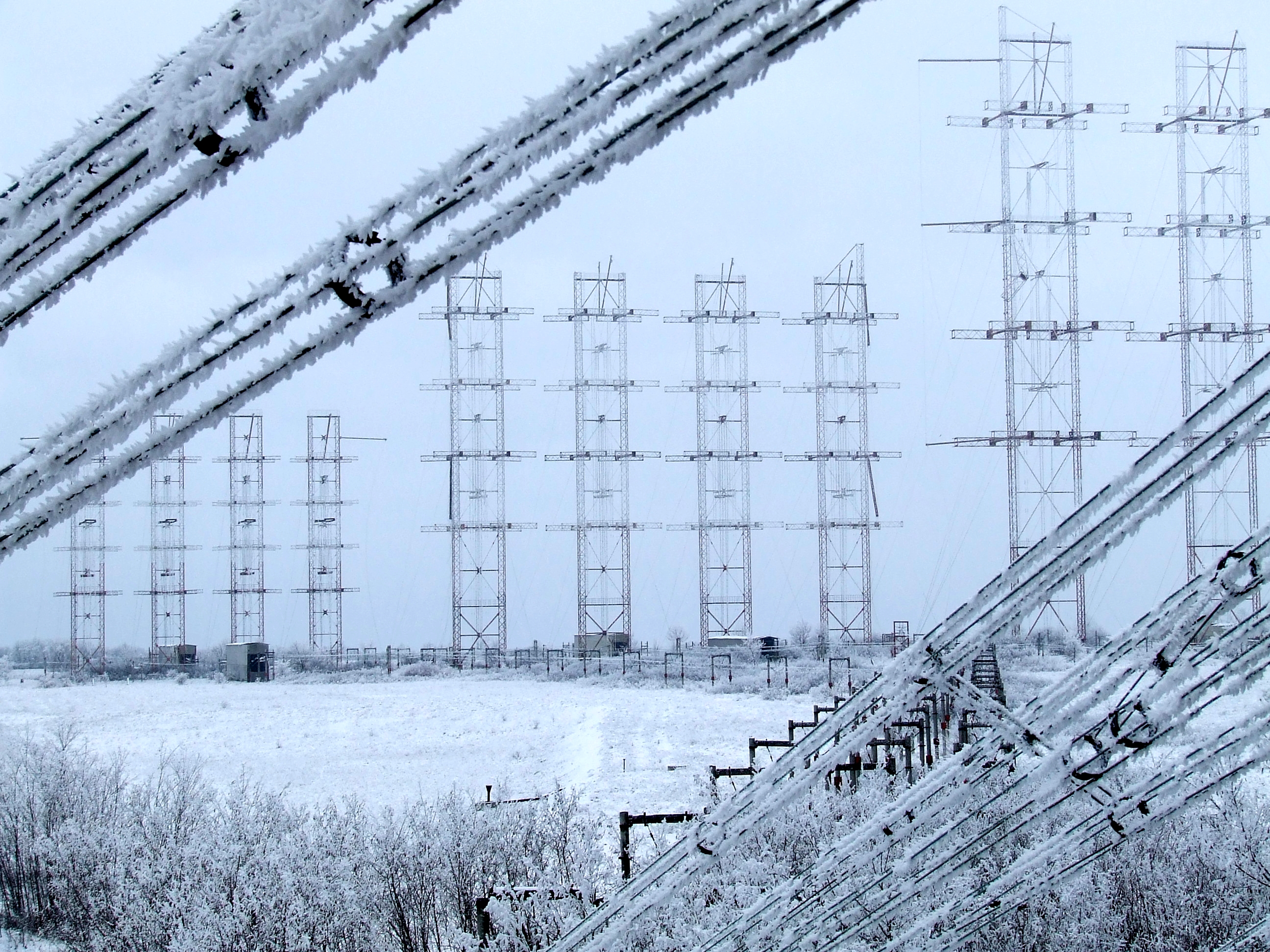
Stationary shortwave antennas
