= Radio in the Soviet Union =

Soviet state radio broadcasting network

All-Union Radio Всесоюзное радио
- Type: Broadcast radio
- Country: Soviet Union

History
- Founded: October 1, 1924
- Launch date: November 23, 1924
- Closed: December 31, 1991
- Replaced by: Radio "Ostankino"
- Former names: Radio broadcast (1 October 1924—12 July 1928); Moscow Radio Center (13 July 1928—December 1933)

Coverage
- Availability: National; International

All-Union Radio (Russian: Всесоюзное радио, romanized: Vsesoyuznoye radio) was the radio broadcasting organisation for the Soviet Union under Gosteleradio, operated from 1924 until the dissolution of the Soviet Union. The organization was based in Moscow.

== History ==
=== Beginning ===
Following the October Revolution control over radio resources was given to the People's Commissariat for Posts and Telegraphs. Then, in 1924 it was transferred to a joint-stock company whose members were the Russian Telegraph Agency, a major electric factory, and the PCPT,10 but in 1928 was returned to the People's Commissariat for Posts and Telegraphs. The first All-Union Radio station, was opened upon Soviet Premier Vladimir Lenin's initiative (for a "paperless newspaper" as the best means of public information) in November 1924. On November 23, 1924 the first regular broadcast was produced in Moscow on the Comintern radio station, using the Shukhov radio tower. In 1925, the Radio Commission of the Central Committee of the RCP(B) was organized for overall supervision of radio broadcasting.

On 30 October 1930, from Tiraspol, Moldavian ASSR, started broadcasting in the Romanian language a Soviet station of 4 kW whose main purpose was the anti-Romanian propaganda to Bessarabia between Prut and Dniester. In the context in which a new radio mast, M. Gorky, built in 1936 in Tiraspol, allowed a greater coverage of the territory of Moldova, the Romanian state broadcaster started in 1937 to build Radio Basarabia, to counter Soviet propaganda.

When the Cold War started, Americans launched the station Radio Free Europe while Western broadcasts were launched in the Eastern bloc.

The first system for meter-wave radio relay links, "Crab," was created in the experimental workshops of the Research Institute of Radio Engineering in 1953-1954 and was used on the communication line across the Caspian Sea between Krasnovodsk and Baku. The next development was the family of the first domestic multi-channel radio relay communication systems, "Strela," in the 1600-2000 MHz range. "Strela-P" with 12 telephone channels was intended for suburban lines, "Strela-M" had 24 channels and was intended for trunk lines up to 2500 km long, and "Strela-T" could transmit a television signal over a distance of 300-400 km. The USSR radio relay communication network began to form on the Strela equipment in the directions Moscow-Ryazan, Moscow-Yaroslavl-Nerekhta-Kostroma-Ivanovo, Moscow-Voronezh, Moscow-Kaluga, Moscow-Tula, Frunze-Jalal-Abad.

Then more advanced RRL systems were created:

- R-60/120 of the 2 GHz range for trunk lines up to 2500 km
- R-600 "Vesna" of the 3.4-3.9 GHz range. (1953-1958, E. S. Shtyren, N. N. Kamensky). In the 1960-70s, it was modernized: R-600M, R-6002M, R600-2MV, "Rassvet".
- Tropospheric radio relay system complex "Gorizont" (1960s), which served as the basis for the creation of the Soviet transarctic tropospheric communication network "Sever" and the first satellite systems.
- High-capacity RRL "Voskhod" for the Moscow - Far East route in the range of 3400-3900 MHz
- Complex of unified radio relay systems "KURS" (KURS-4, KURS-6, KURS-2M, etc.) for the ranges of 2, 4, 6 and 8 GHz with wide unification of elements.
- Intra-zone RRL systems "Oblast-1" (late 1970s) and "Rakita-8" (1986) in the range of 7.9-8.4 GHz.
- Trunk RRL "Raduga" of the range 3400-3900 and 5670-6170 MHz and terminal equipment to it "Rapira-M" for 1920 channels of TF or digital flow at 34.368 Mbit/s.
- One of the last works of the Soviet period was the R&D "Radius" of 1990 - "Intra-zone digital radio relay system of the third generation of the 8 GHz range", which was completed after the collapse of the USSR.

=== Radio jamming ===
Beginning in 1948, the USSR made use of radio jamming to prevent its citizens from listening to political broadcasts of the British Broadcasting Corporation (BBC) and the Voice of America (VOA) and other western radio programs. Over time this initial effort was escalated dramatically, with the approximately 200 jamming stations with a total between 3 and 4 megawatts of output power in 1952 expanded to about 1,700 transmitters with a combined 45 megawatts of output power. By this latter date, the list of jammed foreign broadcasts had been expanded to include not only the successors to the BBC and VOA, Radio Free Europe and Radio Liberty, but also Deutsche Welle, Radio Vatican, Kol Israel, and others. Total electricity consumed in the course of this jamming operation has been valued at tens of millions of dollars annually, exclusive of site construction and personnel costs.

Jamming was initially attempted by means of superimposed random speech which mimicked station interference. Due to the ineffectiveness of this method, however, a move was later made to the generation of random noise to obscure human speech. From the early 1970s, satellites generating swinging carrier signals were used to interfere even more effectively.

Nevertheless, people continued (or attempted) to listen to Western broadcasts. In fact, there was even no jamming of these signals (excluding Radio Free Europe) at all, from 1963 to 1968, and from 1973 to 1980. In 1963, a further attempt was made to draw USSR radio listeners from western broadcasts by launching a radio station favouring Moscow city and oblast.

The jamming stopped in 1988 (Radio Free Europe was, however, unblocked in August 1991).

=== Collapse of the USSR ===
As the USSR began to fall in the 1980s, the radio organisation of the USSR began to shut down as private services were introduced and the USSR's stations were relaunched and refocused.

== Stations ==
=== Domestic ===
- All Union First Programme – the national network of the USSR, focusing on the political and economic life of the Soviet Union.
- Radio Mayak – music and speech based entertainment
- Radio Yunost – the station for young people
- Radio Orfey – culture, education, classical music

=== International ===
- Radio Moscow – the foreign-language service

== See also ==
- Eastern Bloc information dissemination
- Radio jamming
- Censorship in the Soviet Union
- Propaganda in the Soviet Union
- Radio Yerevan jokes
- Media of the Soviet Union
- Ministry of Radio Technology (Soviet Union)
