= Radio Mayak =

Russian radio station

Radio Mayak Радио Маяк
- Logo since 2022
- Russia
- Frequencies: FM: 103.4 MHz (Moscow), 107.0 FM (St. Petersburg); Digital television: Radio 2

Programming
- Language: Russian
- Format: News, talk, and music

Ownership
- Owner: VGTRK
- Sister stations: Radio Rossii, Vesti FM, Radio Yunost

History
- Founded: June 24, 1964; 62 years ago
- First air date: August 1, 1964; 62 years ago

Links
- Website: www.radiomayak.ru

Radio Mayak (Russian: Радио Маяк) is a radio broadcasting company in Russia, owned by VGTRK. Mayak is the Russian word for "lighthouse" or "beacon". As well as Radio Mayak proper (which broadcasts news, talk shows, and popular music), the company is also responsible for the youth music channel Radio Yunost. Radio Mayak was established on 1 August 1964 as a major All-Union Radio station dedicated to news and light music. Its name and format were probably inspired by the BBC Light Programme. Until recently it was transmitted on long wave, medium wave and shortwave. Advertising was introduced in the 1980s. The station's trademark "Moscow Nights" tuning signal is played every 30 minutes.

== History ==
Radio Mayak was formally established in accordance with a resolution of the Central Committee of the Communist Party of the Soviet Union issued on 24 June 1964. The founder of Mayak is considered to be one of the future ideologists of perestroika, Alexander Yakovlev. Its first editor-in-chief, as well as the entire Main Information Editorial Board (Poslednie Izvestiya - Mayak), was Vladimir Dmitrievich Tregubov. An excerpt from the memoirs of Lyudmila Petrushevskaya about her work at Poslednie Izvestiya:

Our chief, Vladimir Tregubov, a handsome man, married many times, completely gray, tanned, whistling through the corridors like a torpedo, Volodya, who spoke abruptly, was always in a hurry and looked over people's heads, he did not delve into details, did not get under people's skin, like many of my later bosses; but at one key moment Tregubov put a final end to his life: at a party meeting, so to speak, he committed suicide by refusing to vote for the introduction of troops into Czechoslovakia in 1968. Then he was gradually driven out...

Since 1966, the outstanding Soviet journalist Yuri Letunov was appointed editor-in-chief, under whom the radio station acquired its characteristic image.

The station began broadcasting on August 1, 1964 from the studio on 25 Pyatnitskaya str. From 1964 to 1983 it adhered to the "5/25" format - five minutes of news and 25 minutes of a music program. Created on the technical basis of the former Second Program of All-Union Radio as an information and music program.

The melody "Moscow Nights" was chosen as a call sign, which is used to this day. Today, few people remember that the first two "minor" bars of this song ("Not even a rustle in the garden is heard...") in the 1960s sounded only in multiples of one hour (9:00, 13:00, 18:00, etc.). At half-hour intervals (9:30, 13:30, 18:30, etc.) the third and fourth, "major" bars were heard ("Everything here froze until the morning"), which made it easy to determine the time by ear with an accuracy of up to half an hour. Later, the call signs were unified (only "Moscow Nights" were heard).

The signal power of the radio station in the AM range was improved during the Soviet period compared to after: radio amateurs of those years had increased opportunity to check and calibrate a newly assembled radio receiver because the call signs of "Mayak" were received well by both large crystal receivers and tiny receivers inside a matchbox on several transistors.

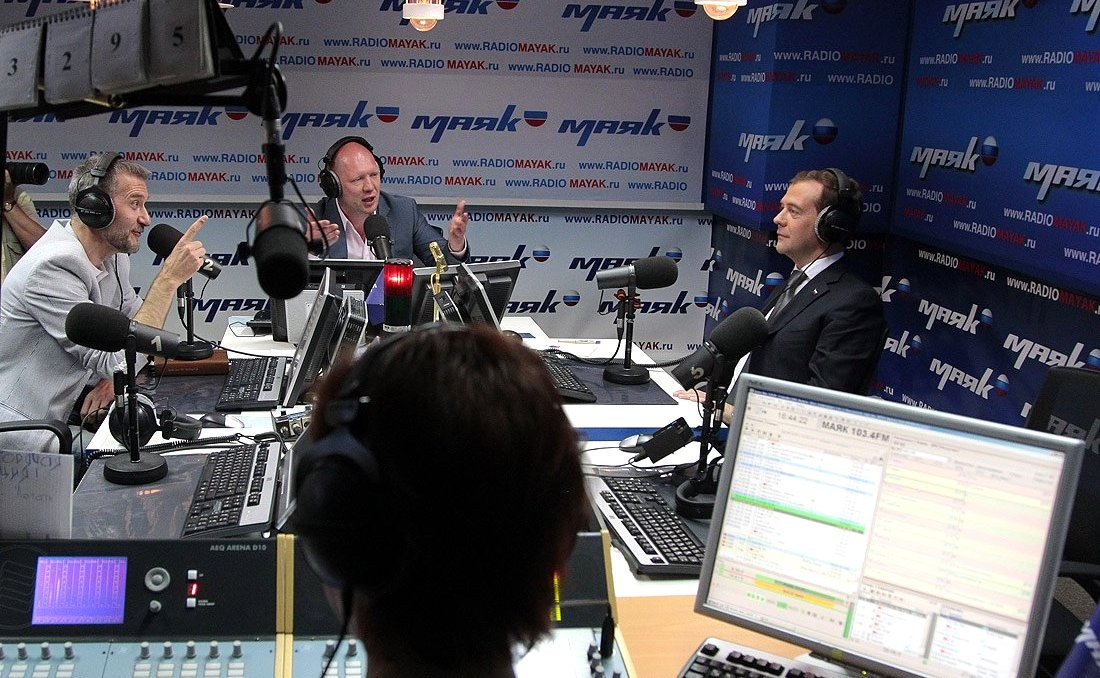
President Medvedev in a visit to the station, May 2011

In the late 1980s, the radio station launched a four-hour "Panorama of Mayak". It was hosted by Nikolai Neich, Vladimir Bezyaev, Pavel Kasparov (later he worked for ORT and TVC), Lyudmila Syomina and many other famous radio hosts of those years. On the air of the radio station, one could hear announcers who, in addition to "Panorama", hosted the news and the popular "Concerts on Letters".

In 1990-1991 Instead of the Main Information Office of the All-Union Radio, the All-Union Information Creative and Production Association "Mayak" was created, on February 8, 1991, it, together with other creative and production structures of the Central Intra-Union Radio Broadcasting, was transferred under the control of the All-Union State Television and Radio Broadcasting Company, on March 19, 1992, the Mayak radio studio of the Ostankino State Television and Radio Broadcasting Company was created. On May 6, 1994, the state enterprise "Radio Station "Mayak" was created on its basis.

As a result of further structural changes, the state unitary enterprise Mayak Radio Station was created on August 9, 1994 on the basis of the Mayak radio studio. On August 4, 1997, the President Boris Yeltsin issued a presidential decree No. 823 "On improving the structure of state radio broadcasting in the Russian Federation", and on November 14, 1997, the Government of Russia adopted resolution No. 1461 "On the All-Russian State Radio Broadcasting Company Mayak". On the basis of these acts, the Federal State Unitary Enterprise All-Russian State Radio Broadcasting Company Mayak (FSUE OGRK Mayak) was created, formed by merging the state enterprise Mayak Radio Station and the state institution All-Russian Radio Station Yunost. On July 27, 1998, FSUE OGRK Mayak was declared a subsidiary of FSUE All-Russian State Television and Radio Broadcasting Company (registered as such on January 13, 2000) and renamed State Radio Broadcasting Company Mayak. On December 28, 2006, FSUE State Radio Broadcasting Company Mayak was liquidated. A branch of the same name, FSUE All-Russian State Television and Radio Broadcasting Company, was created on its basis.

In the early to mid-2000s, the radio station's FM and VHF broadcasts did not always coincide, since Mayak broadcast on VHF, and Mayak-24, an information and talk radio station, broadcast on FM, respectively. Mayak-24 was distinguished primarily by the presence of news releases every 15 minutes; the launch of the radio channel was accompanied by the release of commercials on TV for MAYAKovskie Novosti (an attempt to create an association between the radio and the Soviet poet Vladimir Mayakovsky). The radio channel existed on the air until the fall of 2005 and ceased to exist due to the fact that this broadcasting format never justified itself. The period of two "Mayaks" also occurred in the fall of 2007: on VHF, the radio station broadcast in the old format with programs of the previous broadcasting concept, and on FM in a new entertainment format. Only since December 2007 the air of the two Mayaks became completely unified.

Since 2007, a new broadcasting concept was proposed by the famous businessman from RMG Sergey Arkhipov, he tried to reorient the radio station to an audience of 25–35 years old.

From September 6 to December 14, 2010, the music airwaves were filled only with Russian rock (except for the program "OldSchool").

Since March 14, 2013, due to the termination of payment by VGTRK for transmitters retransmitting the signal, the radio station stopped broadcasting on long and medium waves and became unavailable in rural and remote settlements, as well as on highways outside cities.

According to research by TNS Gallup Media (Russia, cities with a population of over 100,000 people) for July–December 2014, Mayak once again confirmed its leadership among all federal radio networks of the information and talk format in terms of average daily listener coverage. During the specified period, the daily audience of the radio station in large cities of Russia amounted to about 4.2 million people (or 6.6% of the total population over 12 years of age).
