= State Committee of Television and Radio Broadcasting of the Soviet Union =

Soviet media broadcast supervisor

- Государственный комитет СССР по телевидению и радиовещанию
- All ministry seals of the Soviet Union used the USSR coat of arms

Agency overview
- Formed: 10 September 1931; 95 years ago
- Dissolved: 27 December 1991; 34 years ago
- Jurisdiction: USSR
- Headquarters: Moscow, Russia
- Agency executive: Chairman
- Parent agency: Council of Ministers of the Soviet Union

The State Committee of Television and Radio Broadcasting of the Soviet Union (Russian: Государственный комитет СССР по телевидению и радиовещанию) commonly known as Gosteleradio of the USSR (Гостелерадио СССР) was the main state body of that supervised over all television and radio broadcasting of the Soviet Union from 10 September 1931, to 27 December 1991.

== History ==
On 10 September 1931, the All-Union Committee on Radio Broadcasting was created under the People's Commissariat of Posts and Telegraphs of the USSR and changed names and functions multiple times. Two years later on 31 January 1933, it was liquidated, and on its basis the All-Union Committee for Radioification and Radio Broadcasting (Russian: Всесоюзный комитет по радиофикации и радиовещанию при СНК СССР) was created under the Council of People's Commissars of the USSR. In 1949 it was liquidated, and on its basis the Radio Information Committee was created under the Council of Ministers of the USSR, which led the Central Intra-Union Radio Broadcasting, and the Radio Broadcasting Committee under the Council of Ministers of the USSR, which directed the Central Radio Broadcasting to foreign countries, in 1953 they were also liquidated, and on their basis the Main Directorate of Radio Information of the Ministry of Culture of the USSR and the Main Directorate of Radio Information of the Ministry of Culture of the USSR were created.

On 16 May 1957, the Main Directorate of Radio Information of the Ministry of Culture of the USSR was liquidated, and on its basis the State Committee on Radio Broadcasting and Television was created under the Council of Ministers of the USSR (the Main Directorate of Radio Broadcasting was subordinated to it on 28 May 1959, and from 1957 to 1959 it operated under the State Committee for Cultural Relations with Foreign Countries ), repeatedly renamed:

- From 24 April 1962 – the State Committee of the Council of Ministers of the USSR on Radio Broadcasting and Television
- From 9 December 1965 – the Committee on Radio and Television under the Council of Ministers of the USSR.
- From 15 July 1970 — the State Committee of the Council of Ministers of the USSR on Television and Radio Broadcasting
- From 5 July 1978 – the State Committee of the USSR on Television and Radio Broadcasting.

Throughout the existence of the committee, the release of television and radio broadcasts was carried out by the subdivisions of the committee (program directorates of Central Television and All-Union Radio), almost all television broadcasts were prepared by the subordinate organizations of the committee acting as subdivisions (thematic main editions of Central Television), only feature films were produced by film studios on request of the committee, most of the documentary television films were produced by the Ekran creative association subordinate to the committee, some by the subdivisions of the local committees on television and radio broadcasting. It was only in the fall of 1990 that some of the TV programs commissioned by the committee began to be prepared by the first private television organizations VID Television Company and Author's Television.

On 8 February 1991, the All-Union State Television and Radio Broadcasting Company was created, to which all the property of the committee was transferred, the committee itself was abolished somewhat later, and on 11 April, the company was declared its legal successor.

== Chairmen ==
Gosteleradio of the USSR was headed by the chairman appointed by the Supreme Soviet of the Soviet Union:

- 1931–1933: Feliks Kon
- 1933–1936: Platon Kerzhentsev
- 1936–1939: Konstantin Maltsev
- 1939–1941: G. I. Stukov
- 1941–1944: D. A. Polikarpov
- 1944–1949, 1953: A. A. Puzin (radio information)
- 1950–1953: S. A. Vinogradov (radio broadcasting)
- 1957–1959: Dmitry Chesnokov
- 1959–1962: Sergei Kaftanov
- 1962–1964: M. A. Kharlamov
- 1964–1970: Nikolai Mesyatsev
- 1970–1985: Sergey Lapin
- 1985–1989: A. N. Aksyonov
- 1989–1990: M.F. Nenashev
- 14 November 1990 – 8 February 1991: L. P. Kravchenko

== See also ==
- Radio in the Soviet Union
- Television in the Soviet Union
