= Radio Yunost =

- Moscow; Russia
- Broadcast area: Soviet Union
- Frequency: 68.84 MHz Ultra-short wave

Programming
- Language: Russian
- Format: Top 40 Dance

Ownership
- Owner: VGTRK; (VGTRK)
- Sister stations: Radio Mayak, Radio Rossii, Vesti FM

History
- First air date: 1962

Links
- Webcast: you-fm.ru
- Website: radiounost.ru

Radio Yunost (Russian: Радио Юность, lit. 'Radio Youth'), also known as "You-FM", was the primary youth radio station in Soviet Union. It currently broadcasts as a livestream online, now broadcasting Soviet music and literary performances.

== History ==
Radio Yunost' began broadcasting in 1962 in what was then the USSR. It was the main station, where Russian people could hear fresh foreign music. Now "Yunost" radio station, also called "You-FM" is part of the Federal State Unitary Enterprise VGTRK, which also includes television channels "Russia", "Sport", "Culture", "Vesti", and "Bibigon", as well as radio stations "Radio Rossii", "Mayak", "Culture", and "Vesti FM". The station shut down as a youth station on January 9, 2014. Radio Yunost was relaunched on January 2, 2018, as an online-only service, now playing older Russian songs and literature-based programming instead of pop and dance music.

== Broadcast ==
Radio Yunost is classified as a music and radioshow station for youth. It is one of the state's channels, meant to appeal to an active youth audience.

=== Distribution ===
Radio Yunost is broadcast throughout Russia, as well as in other parts of Europe, on the LW, MW and FM bands.

=== Satellites ===
Radio Yunost is broadcast through the satellites:

- Ekspress AM3 C High DVB
- Ekspress A2 Tp 6 DVB
- Ekspress AM33 Steerable DVB
- Yamal 201 C DVB
- Ekspress MD1 C DVB
- Ekspress AM1 Tp 6 DVB
