= Vladimir Rayevsky (journalist) =

Russian journalist

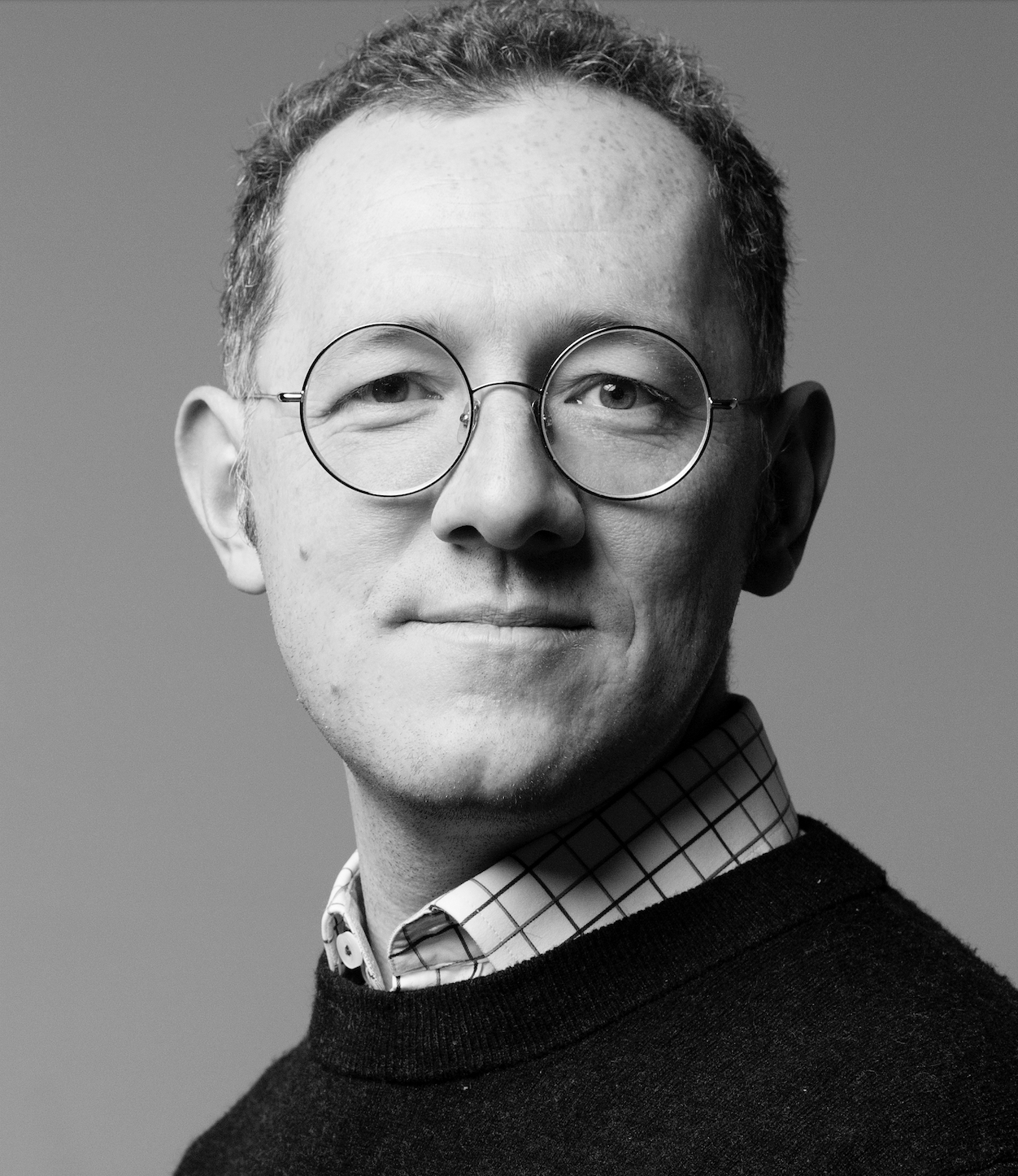

Vladimir Yevgenyevich Rayevsky (Russian: Влади́мир Евге́ньевич Рае́вский; born 31 May 1985) is a Russian journalist, TV and radio presenter, producer. Two-time laureate of the national television award TEFI.

== Biography ==
He was born on 31 May 1985 into the family of physicist Evgeny Iosifovich Raevsky (b. 1953) and music pedagogy teacher Svetlana Evgenyevna Raevskaya (b. 1959) in Sverdlovsk.

He began his television career as a correspondent for the program Morning Express on Channel 4 in Yekaterinburg. In his reports, alongside famous Ural figures, he shared stories about well-known local landmarks: with Sergey Bobunets — about the square near the Central Department Store; with Dmitry Astrakhan — about Lenin Avenue; and with Ilya Kormiltsev — about the Architectural Institute's club (the recording site of the album Razluka by the band Nautilus Pompilius in 1986).

In 2008, he moved from Yekaterinburg to Moscow.

As a producer for the program Profession — Reporter on NTV, he worked with Andrey Loshak. He participated in the filming of notable films in the series, such as Not Our Business (about everyday indifference), And the Battle Continues (about Russians and Ukrainians on the eve of the 300th anniversary of the Battle of Poltava), and Now This Is an Office (about the demolition of historic buildings in Moscow and St. Petersburg).

Simultaneously, he worked as an editor for Leonid Parfyonov during the filming of the documentaries Bird-Gogol (for the 200th anniversary of Nikolai Gogol — 2009) and Zvorykin-Muromets (about television inventor Vladimir Zworykin — 2010).

== Host ==
2011–2012 — Hosted the program Human FAQtor on the channels Nauka 2.0 and Rossiya-2. Each episode explored everyday phenomena (e.g., sound, water, wood, plastic) and highlighted innovations by Russian scientists in these fields.

2013–2014 — Creator and host of Over Lunch on Moskva 24. Daily conversations with guests during lunch at their favorite Moscow restaurants.

2014–2021 — Host of Made in Moscow (renamed Raevsky’s Moscow in December 2019). Over 200 documentary films aired, covering the history of Moscow’s creations and innovations — from the Patriarch Ponds and Doctor’s sausage to Malevich’s Black Square and Venedikt Yerofeyev’s poem Moscow to the End of the Line. Starting in 2018, episodes focused on specific Moscow events: Michael Jackson’s 1993 concert, the Mona Lisa exhibition at the Pushkin Museum, the clash between metalheads and lyubery gangs during perestroika, Le Corbusier’s work in Stalinist Moscow, the Ocean store scandal, and the exhumation of Ivan the Terrible. The show pioneered a narrative method where the host became part of the reconstructed stories.

2016 — Creator and host of Treasures of the Nation on Moya Planeta, featuring unusual global museums, from Vienna’s Funeral Museum to Zagreb’s Museum of Broken Relationships.

2017–2018 — Co-host of Scientific Stand Up on Kultura with Nikita Belogolovtsev.

2019 — Creator and host of Unprecedented Sacrilege on Kultura, exploring art scandals from Goethe’s The Sorrows of Young Werther to Nikita Khrushchev’s infamous shutdown of the 1962 avant-garde exhibition at Moscow Manege.
