= Moscow 24 =

Russian television channel

Moscow 24 (Москва 24)
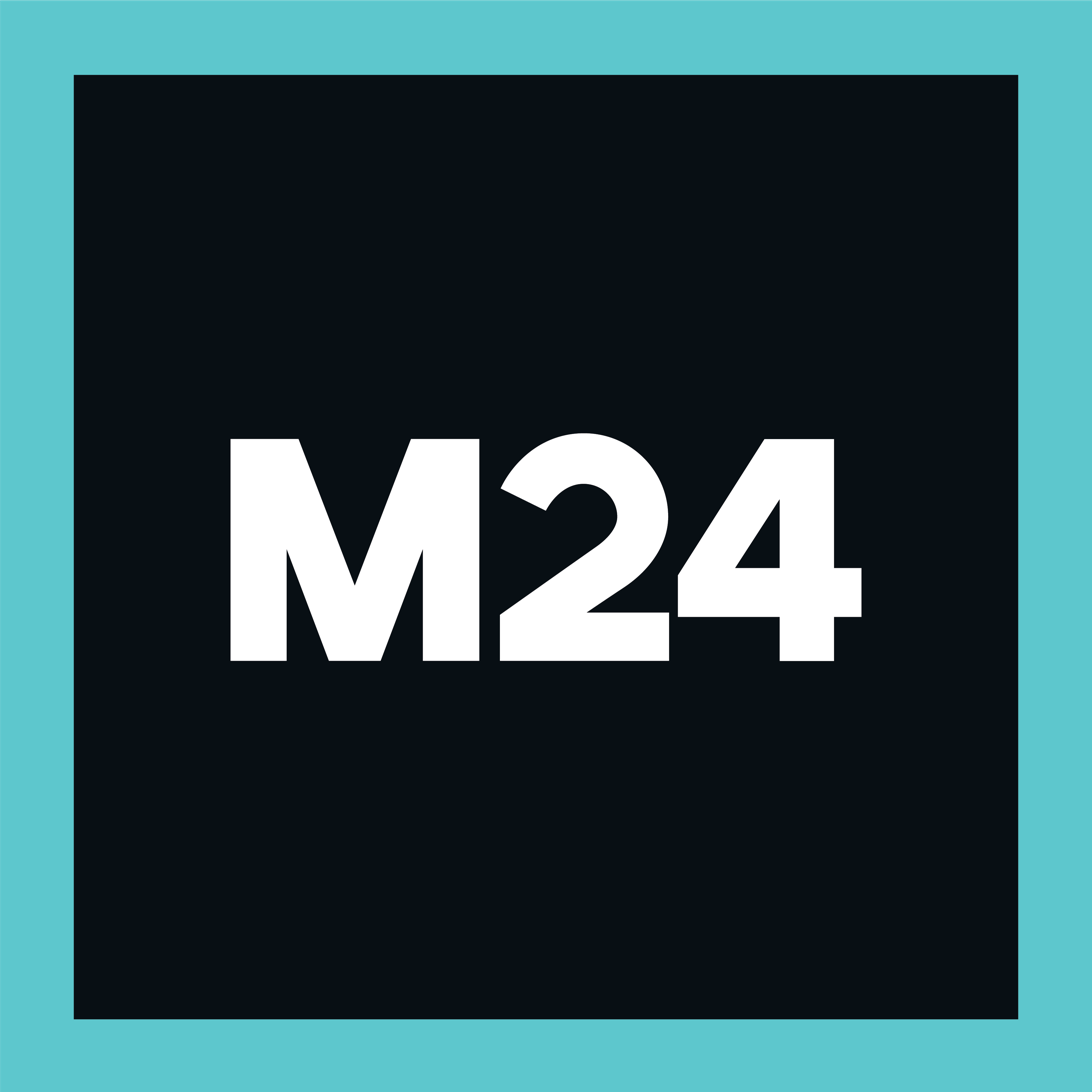
- Country: Russia
- Broadcast area: Moscow
- Network: Moscow Media
- Headquarters: Moscow, Russia

Programming
- Picture format: 576i (SDTV); 16:9 (HDTV)

Ownership
- Owner: Russian Government; Moscow City Government
- Sister channels: Russia-1, Russia-2, Carousel, Russia-K, Russia-24, RTR-Planeta

History
- Launched: 5 September 2011; 14 years ago

Links
- Website: http://m24.ru

Availability

Terrestrial
- Analogue (only in Moscow): Channel 10

Streaming media
- tv.m24.ru: Livestream (Unavailable at 00:30 – 06:00)
- russia.tv: Moscow 24. Live
- youtube.com: Livestream (Available 24 hours a day)

Moscow 24 (Russian: Москва 24) is a Russian 24-hour TV channel, a part of the "Moscow Media" Incorporated editorial office of Moscow media sources and referred to All-Russia State Television and Radio Broadcasting Company (VGTRK). The Channel is headquartered in Moscow City with its production facilities and operations, and is available in Moscow, Moscow Region and Crimea. Promoted as the main city TV channel created to target all the citizens and visitors of Moscow interested in the news, life and opportunities of the city. About 50 percent of the content is devoted to live news broadcasting and information programs. The Channel also provides various entertainment and consumer oriented shows.

== History ==
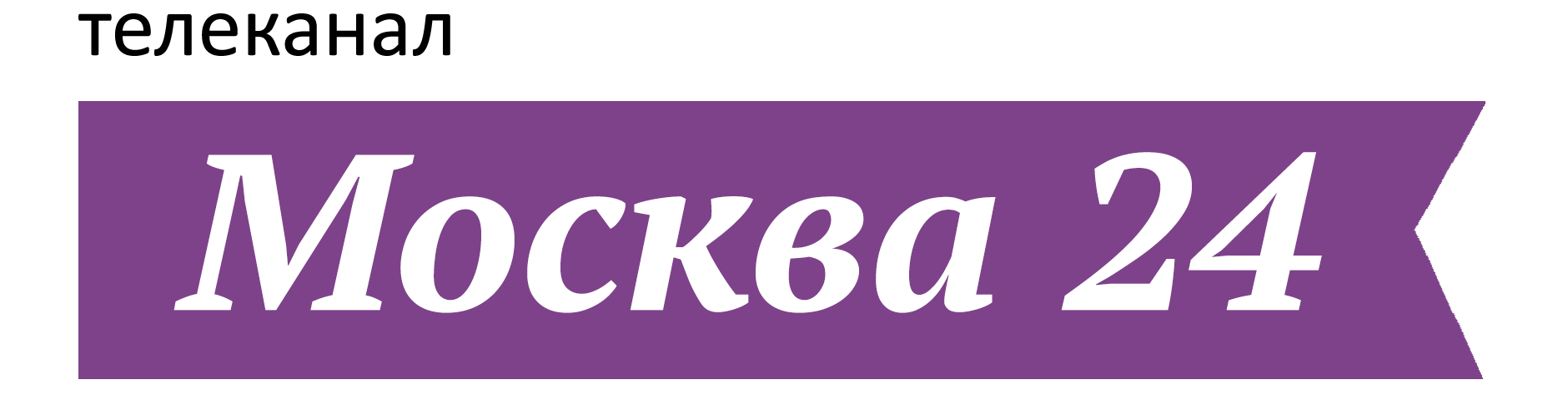
Former logo

Founded upon an initiative of the Government of Moscow on the basis of "Stolitsa" TV Channel (1997-2011) and launched on September 5, 2011 starting with the live presentation of the Channel to the Mayor of Moscow Sergey Sobyanin. In 2016 the Channel marked the 5-years anniversary, announcing reality TV as the main current direction of their non-informational programming.

== Current programming ==
- The City
- Рейд
- МОСКОВСКИЙ ПАТРУЛЬ (Moscow Patrol)
- Вечер
- Доктор 24
- Гост
- фанимани
- Спорная Территория
- Специальный Репортаж
- Подкаст
- Factory

== News, weather and traffic ==
- Новостями (News): Updates every hour (every half-hour at 6-10am weekdays). The half past at other times are reviews.
- погоды (Weather): At :15 and :45 around the clock. At :45 weekdays & weekend evenings are overview for tomorrow's outlook.
- Трафик (Traffic): Airs every 15 minutes weekdays morning, it updates Moscow roads' situations.
