= My Planet =

My Planet Моя Планета
- Country: Russia
- Broadcast area: Russia, Worldwide
- Network: VGTRK
- Headquarters: Moscow, Russia

Programming
- Picture format: 576i (16:9 SDTV)

Ownership
- Owner: Russian Government
- Sister channels: Russia-1, Russia-2, Carousel, Russia-K, Russia-24, RTR-Planeta

History
- Launched: 1 November 2009; 15 years ago

Links
- Website: http://www.moya-planeta.ru/

Availability

Terrestrial
- Analogue: —

My Planet (Russian: Моя планета) is a state-owned Russian television channel. It belongs to the All-Russia State Television and Radio Company (VGTRK), Russia’s main state television group.

My Planet TV launched in 2009 as Russia’s first TV channel dedicated to travel, science and history.

A national channel, My Planet TV also has a growing audience in Ukraine, Kazakhstan, the Baltic States, Belarus and across the CIS. Moya Planeta TV programs are also screened by Russia-2 and Russia-24, two of Russia’s main channels. My Planet TV is available for free by satellite across Europe.

In 2011, My Planet announced the My Planet Travel Awards with the aim of celebrating the most popular destinations, resorts and services in the eyes of Russian tourists. Voted for exclusively by the Russian public and by Russian travel industry professionals, the My Planet Travel Awards provide a snapshot of the growth of this dynamic market. Following a huge nationwide awareness campaign, thanks to the coverage of the event’s TV partners and a public online vote, the awards will culminate with a gala dinner for the winners will be announced. With guests from Russia and around the world, the dinner took place on 22 September 2011.

The Awards have been designed to ensure that any hotel, resort, destination, country or travel service provider that wishes to enter the competition will be represented in the My Planet Travel Awards.
