= Carousel (TV channel) =

Russian TV channel for children

Carousel Carousel International Карусель Карусель International
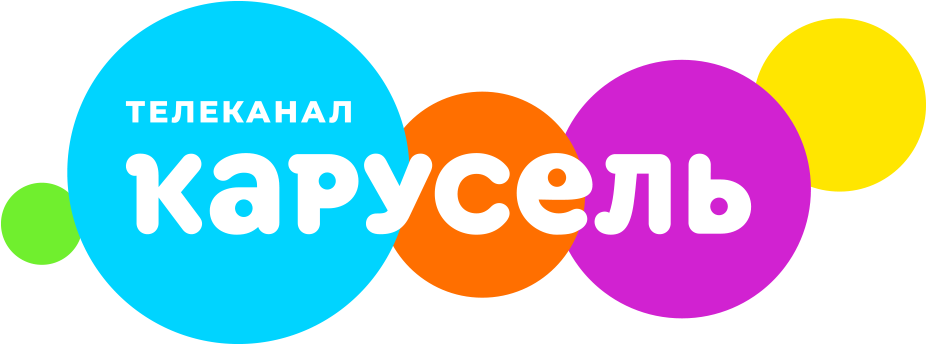
- Logo used since 2023
- Country: Russia
- Broadcast area: Russia; CIS nations Europe; United States; Canada; Israel; United Arab Emirates; India; United Kingdom; Mongolia
- Headquarters: Moscow, Russia

Programming
- Language: Russian
- Picture format: 1080i HDTV (downscaled to 576i/480p for the SDTV feed)

Ownership
- Owner: Channel One (50%); VGTRK (50%)
- Sister channels: Channel One Russia, Russia-1, Russia-2, Russia-24, Russia-K, RTR-Planeta, My Planet, Moscow 24

History
- Launched: 27 December 2010; 15 years ago

Links
- Website: www.karusel-tv.ru

Availability

Terrestrial
- Threecolor: Channel 8

Carousel or Carousel International, also known by its transliterated Russian name Karusel (Карусель), is a Russian television dedicated to children and youth. It was founded by Russian president Dmitry Medvedev. It is currently available in Russia, CIS nations, France via Free ISP, United States via DirecTV, Turkey via Tivibu, and others, including the rest of Europe, Canada, UK and India.

Since the 2022 Russian invasion of Ukraine, Carousel International airs only Russian cartoons and some cartoons outside Russia, which is what other channels in Russia are doing as well except 2x2.

== History ==
The children's and youth channel Carousel was established on 27 December 2010, through the merger of the channels TeleNyanya (operated by ZAO "Pervy Kanal". Worldwide Network, known as Erudit/TeleNyanya from 2006 to 2007) and Bibigon (owned by FGUP VGTRK). This unification followed a decree signed by Russian president Dmitry Medvedev on 24 June 2009, mandating the consolidation of the two channels into a single youth-oriented broadcaster by 1 January 2011.

From 2010 to 2014, Carousel's programming included children's shows, TV series, animated films, animated series, and feature films. On weekdays, approximately 66% of airtime was dedicated to animated series, 21% to educational programs, 6% to TV series, 5% to feature films, and 2% to standalone animated films. Weekend schedules shifted to 25% animated series, 15% TV series, 14% feature films, 19% programs, and 27% animated films.

Alongside the culture channel Russia-Kultura (prior to the launch of OTR), Karousel was one of two federal Russian TV channels that broadcast without commercial advertising until 2011, when sponsored segments were introduced. By 2014, full commercial advertising appeared on the channel. Initially focused on children's products, the ad content expanded to include food and pharmaceuticals due to the channel's growing audience of women over 40.

In 2013, the channel launched its first children's comedy series about school life, Klassnaya Shkola (Cool School). By 2014, many original shows and animated series began disappearing from the schedule. That same year, Karousel secured exclusive rights to broadcast the 250-hour "golden collection" of Soyuzmultfilm Studio's classic animations. In 2016, the channel premiered Semyа Svetoforovykh (The Traffic Light Family), its first educational series teaching road safety rules.

== Programming ==
Carousel's lineup featured animated series such as The Fixies, The Smurfs, My Little Pony: Friendship Is Magic, Masha and the Bear, Moonzy, KikoRiki, Belka and Strelka: Mischievous Family, Maya the Bee, Yeralash, Kid-E-Cats, The Barkers, Super Wings, Be-Be-Bears, Fantasy Patrol, Little Tiaras, Loudly Ville, Grizzy & the Lemmings, among others. Programming categories included:

- Sports (Olympiitsy and Pryg-Skok Komanda)
- Music (Neovecherinka and Smeshnye Prazdniki)
- Cultural education (Istoriya Iskusstv s Khryushey i Filey / Art History with Khryusha and Filya)
- Cooking (Malenkiy Shef and Neokukhnya)
- Animal-themed (Ot Nosa do Khvosta and Zhizn Zamechatelnykh Zverey)
- Intellectual games (Vopros na Zasypku and Odin Protiv Vsekh)
- Educational (Davayte Risovat and Lovi Moment)
- Science (Estestvoznaniye. Lektsii + Opyty and Prostaya Nauka).

== Ownership ==
The television channel is de facto 100% state-owned. Ownership is equally divided, with 50% of the shares held by AO "Pervy Kanal. Worldwide Network" and the remaining 50% by FGUP "VGTRK". The channel is managed by AO "Carousel" (prior to April 2017, it operated as a ZAO). In April 2017, changes were made to the management structure, introducing two positions each for general directors and editors-in-chief, with one representative appointed by each of the founding entities.
