= Bibigon =

Russian children's television channel

Bibigon Бибигон
- Country: Russia
- Broadcast area: Russia
- Headquarters: Moscow, Russia

Programming
- Language: Russian
- Picture format: SECAM (576i)

Ownership
- Owner: VGTRK
- Sister channels: Russia 1, Russia 2, Russia K, Russia 24, RTR Planeta

History
- Launched: 1 September 2007; 19 years ago
- Closed: 27 December 2010
- Replaced by: Carousel

Links
- Website: www.bibigon.ru

Bibigon (Russian: Бибигон) was a Russian television channel dedicated to children and adolescents. The channel, a subsidiary of Russia-1 and owned by VGTRK, was first launched on 1 September 2007. It was originally launched as a block in daytime on Russia, Sport and Culture channels. The channel was named after the character of Chukovsky's fairy tale "The adventures of Bibigon".

On 27 December 2010 the channel was closed and its air time was replaced by Carousel, which merged Bibigon with Telenyanya (ТелеНяня, "Telenanny").
