= Bibigon (disambiguation) =

Bibigon was a Russian children's TV channel.

Bibigon may also refer to:

- Bibigon, a character from the 1945-1946 fairy tale Bibigon's Adventures by Russian children's writer Korney Chukovsky
- Bibigon (film), a 1981 animated film based on the fairy tale
