= The Fixies =

Russian children's animated series

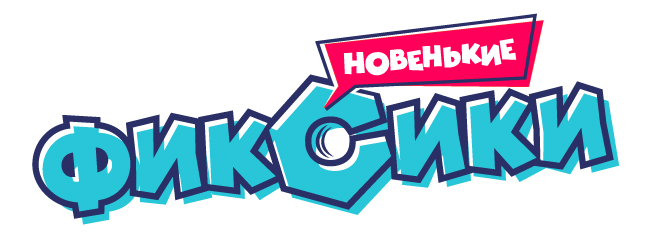
- Logo of the fourth season of the Russian-language version of The Fixies
- Also known as: The Fixies: Newcomers (season 4); The Fixies: High Five! (season 5); The Fixies: It's About Time! season 6)
- Genre: Educational; Children's television series Adventure; Comedy
- Created by: Alexander Tatarsky
- Based on: The Little Warranty People by Eduard Uspensky
- Written by: Eduard Uspensky
- Directed by: Vladimir Ponomarev; Vasiko Bedoshvili; Andrey Kolapin; Ivan Pshonkin; Milana Fedoseev; Dzhangir Suleymanov; Roman Sokolov
- Voices of: Larisa Brokhman; Yakov Vasilyev; Yuri Mazikhin; Pyotr Ivashchenko; Dmitry Nazarov; Dmitry Buzhinsky; Inna Koroleva; Varvara Obidor; Diomid Vinogradov; Prokhor Chekhovskoy; Tatyana Veselkina; Artem Mosin-Shchepachev
- Composer: Lev Zemlinsky
- Country of origin: Russia
- Original language: Russian
- No. of seasons: 6
- No. of episodes: 305 (list of episodes)

Production
- Producers: Georgy Vasilyev; Ilya Popov; Michael Mennies; Konstantin Tarasov
- Editor: Pavel Muntyan
- Running time: 5–7 minutes
- Production companies: Aeroplane Productions; Riki Group

Original release
- Network: Russia-1 (2010–2014); Bibigon; Carousel (2011–present); Russia-K (2014); Da Vinci; PLUSPLUS (2014–2022)
- Release: December 13, 2010 – present

The Fixies (Russian: Фиксики, romanized: Fiksiki) is a Russian animated children's television series based on the 1974 Soviet children's story The Little Warranty People by Eduard Uspensky. The series premiered on 13 December 2010 as a segment on the television show Good Night, Little Ones! on Russia-1 and Bibigon. The series was created by Alexander Tatarsky and is produced by Aeroplane Productions.

== Premise ==
The Fixies centers around the adventures of little people called fixies (a portmanteau of "fix" and "pixie") who live inside various devices and keep them in order with their technical knowledge. Each episode focuses on a particular everyday device and involves the fixies explaining what it is, how it works, and how to safely use it.

One of the protagonists is Tom Thomas, who managed to make friends with fixies named Simka and Nolik. To learn more about different things, they are helped by older fixies—their parents Papus and Masiya, as well as Grandpus. At the same time, Tom Thomas is obliged to keep the fixies' existence a secret from everyone else and to protect them from his dog Chewsocka.

In the second season, new characters were introduced—four fixie classmates of Simka and Nolik: Fire, Digit, Toola, and Verda, as well as human Professor Eugenius and his secretary Elisa, whose laboratory houses a school of young fixies taught by elderly fixie Grandpus.

Появление в сериале учёного-исследователя и нового места действия расширяет наши возможности. Главное, что мы теперь сможем коснуться таких тем, о которых в обстановке обычной квартиры и с помощью героя-ребёнка было не рассказать. Например, мы запускаем в производство серии «Огнетушитель», «Подушка безопасности», «Провода», «Экотестер». Всё это позволит сериалу «Фиксики» стать более универсальным и ответить на большее количество «почему?», которые родители слышат от детей.

The appearance of a researcher and a new place of action in the series expands our capabilities. The main thing is that we will now be able to touch on topics which had not been covered within the atmosphere of an ordinary apartment with a child character. For example, there will be episodes on fire extinguishers, airbags, electrical wires, and ecotesters. All of this will allow The Fixies to become more universal and respond to a greater number of questions that parents hear from children.

— Georgy Vasilyev, producer

== Characters ==
=== Fixies ===
- Simka (voiced by Larisa Brokhman) is a 9- to 10-year-old girl and Nolik's older sister.
- Nolik (voiced by Yakov Vasilyev, Andrey Kononov, Artem Skosaryev, Ilya Sintsov, and Nikita Danko) is a 5- to 6-year-old boy and Simka's younger brother.
- Papus (voiced by Yuri Mazikhin, Gosha Kutsenko, and Pyotr Ivashchenko) is Masiya's husband and father of Simka and Nolik.
- Masiya (voiced by Inna Koroleva) is Papus's wife and mother of Simka and Nolik.
- Grandpus (voiced by Dmitry Nazarov and Dmitry Buzhinskiy) is Simka and Nolik's grandfather. Peer of Professor Eugenius and teacher of Simka, Nolik, Fire, Digit, Toola, and Verda, and most often the victim of the group's unintentional heckling. He is well versed in analog and mechanical devices, but lacks expertise with modern devices.
- Fire (voiced by Inna Koroleva and Prokhor Chekhovskoy) is one of Simka and Nolik's classmates and Verda's boyfriend. Exemplifies the School Bully Stock Character. Often hectors Digit.
- Digit (voiced by Larisa Brokhman and Stanislav Yevsin) is one of Simka and Nolik's classmates and Toola's boyfriend. Exemplifies the Nerd Stock Character.
- Toola (voiced by Varvara Obidor) is one of Simka and Nolik's classmates and Digit's girlfriend. Portrayed as athletic and extroverted.
- Verda (voiced by Inna Koroleva and Yekaterina Semenova) is one of Simka and Nolik's classmates and Fire's girlfriend. Arrogant and often demeaning of her classmates.
- Tweak and Geek (voiced by Prokhor Chekhovskoy) are twin brothers.
- Basiya (voiced by Lilia Shaykhitdinova) is Tweak and Geek's foster grandmother and Grandpus's rival.
- Alt (voiced by Dmitry "Syenduk" Karpov, Yevgeniy "Topa" Popadinets, and Artem Mosin-Shchepachev) is Simka's boyfriend.
- Mega (voiced by Tatyana Veselkina) is Nolik's girlfriend.

=== Other characters ===
- Tom Thomas (voiced by Ivan Dobryakov, Andrei Kluban, Felix Golovnin, Alexander Novikov, Yaroslav Efremenko, Roman Lenkov, Miroslav Aksyonov, and Daniel Minkov) is a 10-year-old boy.
- Tom's Mom (voiced by Larisa Brokhman)
- Tom's Dad (voiced by Aleksey Rossoshanskiy and Pyotr Ivashchenko)
- Chewsocka is the Thomas family's pet chihuahua.
- Buggy is a navy blue spider. She is the Fixies' pet as seen in the episode "The Spider".
- Professor Eugenius (voiced by Diomid Vinogradov and Artem Mosin-Shchepachev) is Grandpus' naive and awkward colleague. Co-teaches the fixie class with Grampus, and lends equipment for experimentation.
- Elisa (voiced by Varvara Obidor) is Professor Eugenius's secretary.
- Katya (voiced by Daria Kolbaseyeva and Anastasia Dyatlova) is Tom Thomas's girlfriend.
- Katya's Mom (voiced by Yuilya Sofronova)
- Super Sammy (voiced by Valeria Shevchenko) is Tom Thomas's best friend.

== Episodes ==
Season	Episodes	Originally released	
Season	Episodes	First released	Last released
Pilots	2	2006	2009
1	52	13 December 2010	24 December 2012
2	52	25 December 2012	16 May 2015
3	53	12 June 2015	26 December 2019
Films		28 October 2017	12 August 2027
4	53	29 February 2020	18 November 2022
5	52	1 December 2022	26 December 2024
6	52	27 September 2025	2027

== Production ==
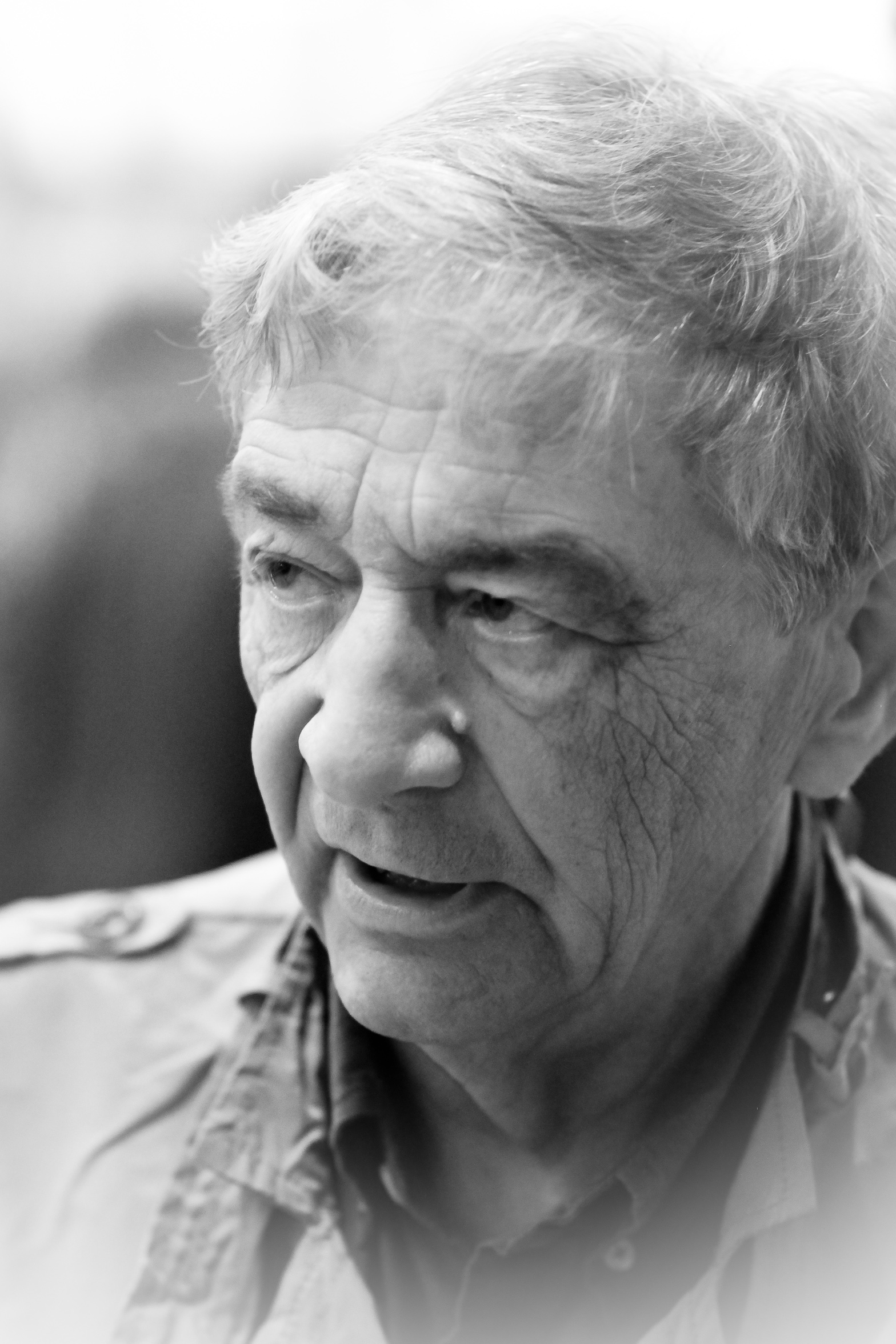
Eduard Uspensky, author of The Little Warranty People

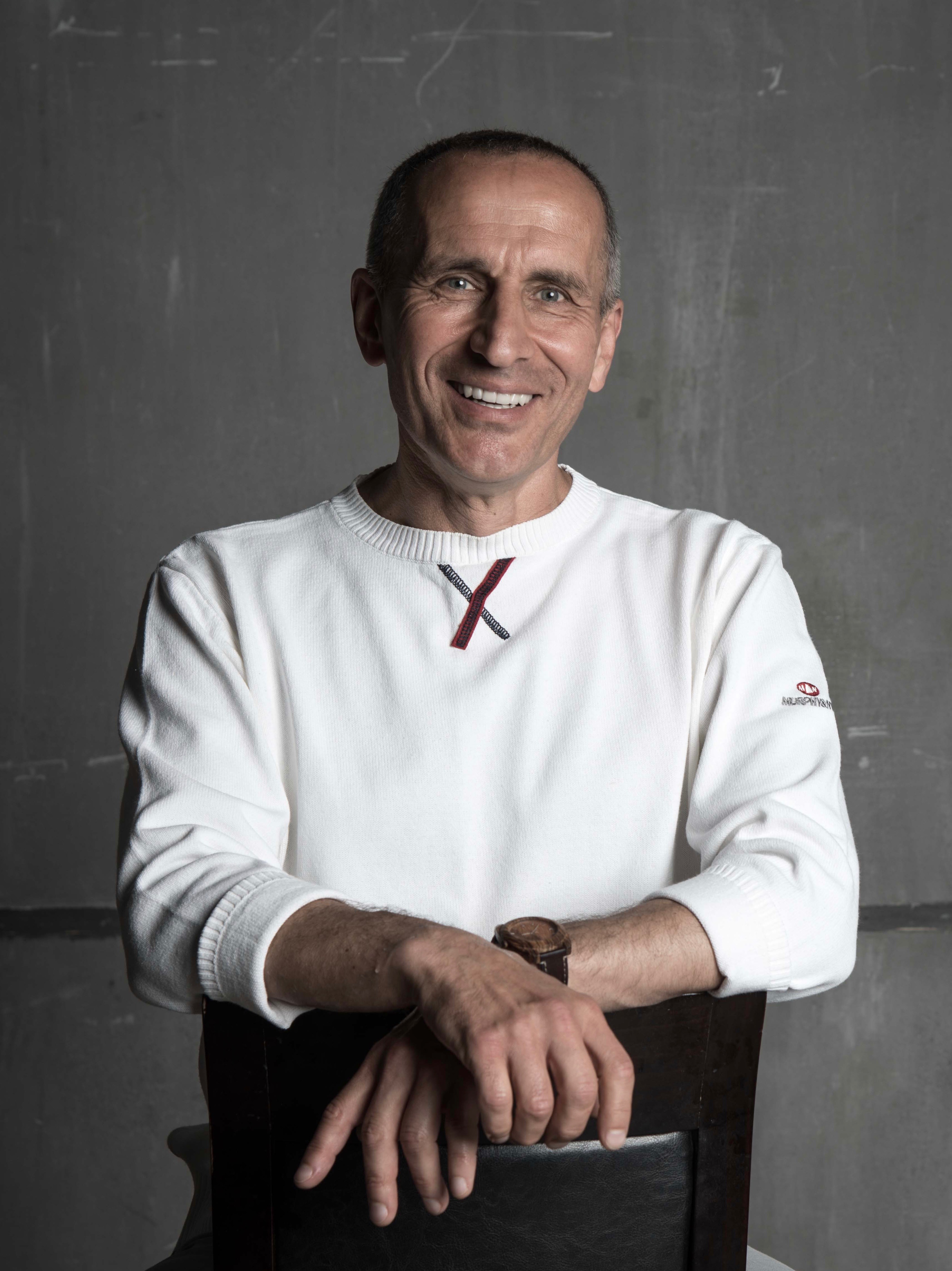
Georgy Vasilyev, producer of The Fixies

In 2005, Aeroplane Studios was established. Before the characters were created, a logo was registered which was a hand with its thumb, index and middle fingers extended upwards, suggesting a gesture similar to the Schwurhand or the Serbian three-finger salute. In the show, the symbol appears on the fixies' clothes, tools and vehicles, and the gesture is used by fixies alongside the interjection "Tideesh!" as a greeting and to celebrate a job well done.

Later, Pronin finalized the fixies' appearances, having given them the following attributes; large hands (due to the fact that fixies are constantly working), glowing hair (due to the fact that fixies constantly work in the dark) and the idea to have the fixies be able to transform into screws. The artist decided to first draw a screw, then draw a fixie whose appearance is derived from that screw. The cartoons primarily used CGI animation with Flash animation being used for explanatory segments.

== Broadcast ==
In 2014, Aeroplane Productions and Nickelodeon signed a license agreement under which the series would begin airing on Nickelodeon's Russian offshoot for a period of two years starting in January 2015.

The series has also been broadcast on Carousel and Dietski. It also aired on Russia-K between July and December 2014 and has aired on Moult since June 2014. It also aired on Tloum HD in the summer of 2016, and on O! since 8 February 2017.

== Films ==
On 28 October 2017, Aeroplane Productions and Petersburg Animation Studio released a full-length animated film called The Fixies: Top Secret, which has been shown in many countries around the world. Even before the release of Top Secret, it was announced that work was underway on a continuation.

On 29 March 2019, a teaser for the second full-length film Fixies vs. Crabots, in which a confrontation takes place between fixies and crab-like robots called Crabots, was released. The film was released on 21 December 2019.

The first teaser for the third feature film, The Fixies and Aliens, will be released at the end of 2026. The film itself will be released on August 12, 2027.
