= Be-Be-Bears =

Russian animated television series

- Also known as: Ми-ми-мишки
- Genre: comedy
- Written by: Anton Lanshakov; Stanislav Mikhailov; Evgeny Golovin; Oleg Kozyrev; Maria Parfyonova; Alexey Mikhalchenko; Elena Ananyeva
- Directed by: Alexey Mironov; Vera Myakisheva
- Voices of: Natalia Medvedeva; Polina Kutepova; Daria Mazanova; Kamilla Valiullina; Daria Kuznetsova; Diomid Vinogradov; Kristina Gavrysh; Eva Finkelshtein; Prokhor Chekhovskoy
- Music by: Sergey Bogolyubsky Daria Stavrovich
- Country of origin: Russia
- Original language: Russian
- No. of seasons: 10
- No. of episodes: 249

Production
- Producers: Tatyana Tsyvareva; Vadim Volya; Evgeny Golovin; Anton Smetankin; Natalia Kozlova
- Running time: 5 minutes 30 seconds
- Production company: Parovoz

Original release
- Network: Mult; Carousel; Russia-K; Russia-1
- Release: March 21, 2015 – present

Be-Be-Bears (Russian title: Ми-ми-мишки, Mi-Mi-Mishki (Note: The Russian name "Misha"/"Mishka" is a colloquial reference to a bear)) is a Russian animated series produced by the animation studio Parovoz. It has been broadcast since March 21, 2015.

The series is about the adventures of tireless amusing animals: a brown bear named Bucky, a polar bear named Bjorn and their friend named Franny.

== Characters ==
- Bjorn/Tuchka
- Bucky/Kesha
- Franny/Littlefox
- Val/Valya
- Sonya
- Sammy/Sanya
- Chicky/Chick

== Worldwide ==
In 2018 Netflix bought from "Parovoz" the distribution rights for the first season starting on August 29, 2018 on Netflix. On May 31, 2020 it was removed after airing only one season (26 episodes). In the English dubbing the bears' names are Bucky and Bjorn.

== Media franchising ==
A mobile game was launched in 2016 for Android and iOS.

== See also ==
- Masha and the Bear
