= Vladimir Raevsky =

Vladimir Raevsky may refer to:

- Vladimir Raevsky (1795–1872), Russian poet
- Vladimir Raevsky (born 1985), Russian journalist, television and radio presenter
