= Crocodile (fairy tale) =

1916–1917 fairy tale poem for children by Korney Chukovsky

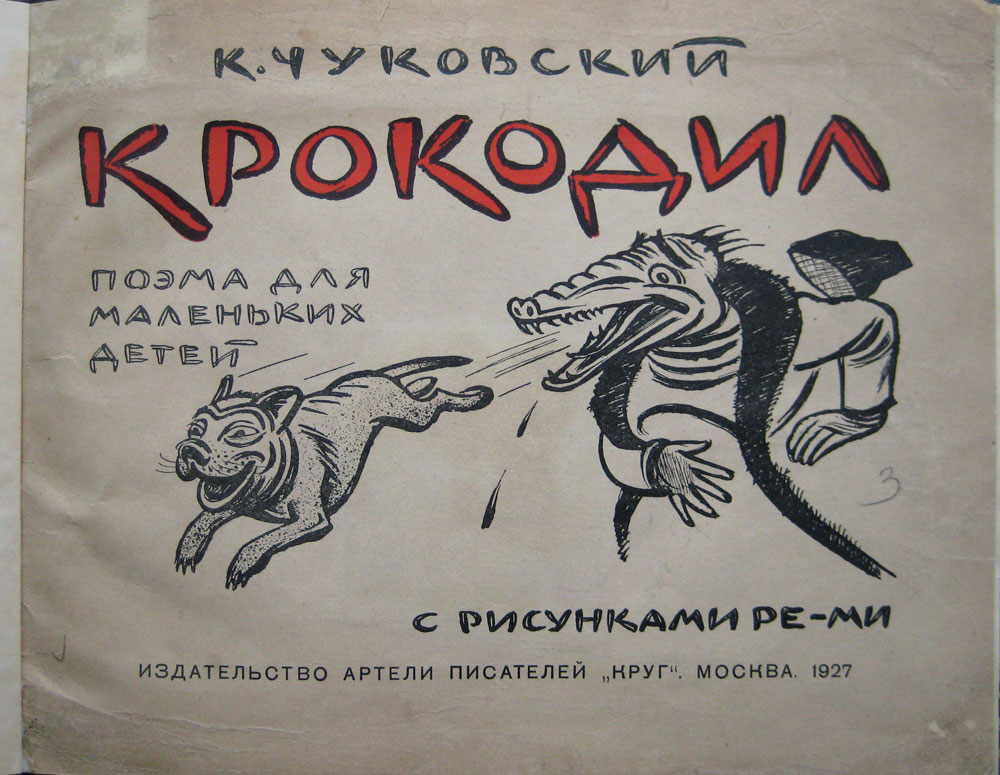
Crocodile book cover, 1927

"Crocodile" (Russian: Крокодил) is a 1916-1917 fairy tale poem for children by Korney Chukovsky about a crocodile strolling along the streets of Petrograd (the contemporary name of St. Petersburg, Russia).

It quickly became very popular, due to its utter nonsense, previously unseen in print, and skillful wordplay. Chukovsky himself said:

I wrote twelve books and no one paid any attention to them. But as soon as I once wrote "Crocodile" as a joke, I became a famous writer. I'm afraid that the whole of Russia knows "Crocodile" by heart. I'm afraid that when I die, on my monument will have an inscription "Author of Crocodile"

In 1939 Yury Tynyanov wrote that "Crocodile" opened up a completely new avenue for the development of poetry for children, whose new sounds of "a quick verse, a change of meters, a rushing song, a chorus" were cancelling "the previous weak and motionless fairy tale of icicle candies, cotton snow, flowers on weak legs". Merriam-Webster's Encyclopedia of Literature characterized "Crocodile", along with other Chukovsky's verse tales as follows, "clockwork rhythms and air of mischief and lightness in effect dispelled the plodding stodginess that had characterized pre-revolutionary children's poetry."

During the surge of the Soviet ideological censorship, known as Zhdanovshchina, Crocodile, was severely criticized along with other children's fantastic tales of Chukovsky in an ideological campaign known as "the struggle with Chukovshchina". "Crocodile" was accused of "propagating misconceptions about the animal world". It addition, the critics tried to find counter-revolutionary undertones in the poem. As Chukovsky wrote:

Why is the hero of "Crocodile" called Vanya Vasilchikov? Is he not a relative of a Prince Vasilchikov, who, it seems, held an important post under Alexander II? And isn’t the Crocodile Denikin in disguise?

== English translations ==
"Crocodile" was translated into English in 1931 by Babette Deutsch in 1931 and by Richard Coe in 1964. The two authors gave substantially different renderings of the poem.

Russian original with line-by-line literal translation:

Russian	English
Жил да был	There lived
Крокодил.	Crocodile.
Он по улицам ходил,	He walked along the streets,
Папиросы курил.	Smoked cigarettes
По-турецки говорил,-	Spoke in Turkish
Крокодил, Крокодил Крокодилович!	Krokodil, Krokodil Krokodilovich (Note: "Krokodil, Krokodil Krokodilovich" is a parody of the formal format of rendering full names in Russian: "Surname, Given-Name Patronymic")

Deutsch	Coe
Once a haughty crocodile	Once there was a crocodile
Left his home upon the Nile	Croc! Croc! Crocodile!
To go strolling off in style	A crocodile of taste and style
On the Ave-e-nue!	And elegant attire
He could smoke and he could speak	He strolled down Piccadilly
Turkish in a perfect streak	Singing carols in Swahili
And he did it once a week	Wearing spats he'd bought in Chile
This most haughty, green and warty	And a-puffing at a briar!
Very sporty	Crocodile! Crocodile! Croc! Croc! Croc!
Crocodile!	Alexander Crocodile, Esquire!
