= List of The Fixies episodes =

The Fixies is a Russian animated television series created by Alexander Tatarsky that premiered on Russia-1 on 13 December 2010. The series revolves around an eponymous race of tiny people who take care of various devices whilst attempting to remain hidden from the humans who use them, with the exception of Tom Thomas and Professor Eugenius. The series is loosely based on The Little Warranty People by Eduard Uspensky.

As of 31 October 2026, 305 episodes of The Fixies have aired, with the series itself having completed its fifth season. The first, second, fifth, and sixth seasons consist of 52 episodes, while the third and fourth consist of 53. A feature-length film, titled The Fixies: Top Secret, was released on 28 October 2017, and a sequel titled Fixies vs. Crabots was released on 21 December 2019.

== Series overview ==
Season	Episodes	Originally released	
Season	Episodes	First released	Last released
Pilots	2	2006	2009
1	52	13 December 2010	24 December 2012
2	52	25 December 2012	16 May 2015
3	53	12 June 2015	26 December 2019
Films		28 October 2017	12 August 2027
4	53	29 February 2020	18 November 2022
5	52	1 December 2022	26 December 2024
6	52	27 September 2025	2027

== Episodes ==
=== Pilots (2006–09) ===
No.	Title	Original release date
1	"The Fixies (achievements for 2006)" (Russian: Фиксики (наработки за 2006 год))	(help)
2	"The Cities" (Russian: Города)	2009

=== Season 1 (2010–12) ===
No. overall	No. in season	Title	Original release date
1	1	"The DVD" (Russian: Компакт-диск)	13 December 2010
2	2	"The Remote" (Russian: Пульт)	14 December 2010
3	3	"The Alarm Clock" (Russian: Будильник)	15 December 2010
4	4	"The Vacuum" (Russian: Пылесос)	16 December 2010
5	5	"The Drain" (Russian: Сифон)	17 December 2010
6	6	"The Refrigerator" (Russian: Холодильник)	17 February 2011
7	7	"The Combination Lock" (Russian: Кодовый замок)	18 February 2011
8	8	"SMS" (Russian: Эсэмэски)	28 February 2011
9	9	"The Balloon" (Russian: Воздушный шар)	23 March 2011
10	10	"The Electric Kettle" (Russian: Электрочайник)	24 March 2011
11	11	"The Toothbrush" (Russian: Зубная щётка)	24 May 2011
12	12	"The Microwave" (Russian: Микроволновка)	26 May 2011
13	13	"The Screws" (Russian: Винтики)	1 September 2011
14	14	"The Electric Train" (Russian: Железная дорога)	2 September 2011
15	15	"The Spare Part" (Russian: Деталька)	3 September 2011
16	16	"The Stapler" (Russian: Степлер)	7 September 2011
17	17	"The Aquarium" (Russian: Аквариум)	9 September 2011
18	18	"The Keyboard" (Russian: Клавиатура)	12 September 2011
19	19	"The Pen" (Russian: Шариковая ручка)	14 September 2011
20	20	"The Cell Phone" (Russian: Сотовый телефон)	16 September 2011
21	21	"The Flashlight" (Russian: Фонарик)	6 December 2011
22	22	"The Washing Machine" (Russian: Стиральная машина)	8 December 2011
23	23	"The Robot" (Russian: Робот)	12 December 2011
24	24	"The Thermometer" (Russian: Термометр)	14 December 2011
25	25	"The Magnet" (Russian: Магнит)	16 December 2011
26	26	"The Music Box" (Russian: Музыкальная шкатулка)	20 December 2011
27	27	"The Short Circuit" (Russian: Короткое замыкание)	22 December 2011
28	28	"The Hair Dryer" (Russian: Фен)	26 December 2011
29	29	"The Fan" (Russian: Вентилятор)	28 December 2011
30	30	"The String Lights" (Russian: Гирлянда)	30 December 2011
31	31	"The Compass" (Russian: Компас)	10 February 2012
32	32	"The Solar Battery" (Russian: Солнечная батарея)	24 February 2012
33	33	"The Ship in a Bottle" (Russian: Кораблик)	20 March 2012
34	34	"Whipped Cream" (Russian: Взбитые сливки)	22 March 2012
35	35	"The Lever" (Russian: Рычаг)	27 March 2012
36	36	"The Magic Wand" (Russian: Волшебная палочка)	29 March 2012
37	37	"The Night Light" (Russian: Ночник)	22 May 2012
38	38	"The Zipper" (Russian: Застёжка-молния)	24 May 2012
39	39	"The Mixer" (Russian: Миксер)	15 October 2012
40	40	"The Cartoon" (Russian: Мультик)	17 October 2012
41	41	"The Magnifying Glass" (Russian: Лупа)	19 October 2012
42	42	"Paper" (Russian: Бумага)	22 October 2012
43	43	"The Thermos" (Russian: Термос)	24 October 2012
44	44	"The Alarm" (Russian: Сигнализация)	26 October 2012
45	45	"The Scale" (Russian: Весы)	26 November 2012
46	46	"The Piggy Bank" (Russian: Копилка)	28 November 2012
47	47	"The Tin Can" (Russian: Консервная банка)	30 November 2012
48	48	"The Internet" (Russian: Интернет)	4 December 2012
49	49	"The Lie Detector" (Russian: Детектор лжи)	5 December 2012
50	50	"Candy" (Russian: Карамель)	6 December 2012
51	51	"The Microphone" (Russian: Микрофон)	7 December 2012
52	52	"The Mirror" (Russian: Зеркало)	24 December 2012

=== Season 2 (2012–15) ===
No. overall	No. in season	Title	Original release date
53	1	"The Team" (Russian: Команда)	25 December 2012
54	2	"Nolik's Cube" (Russian: Кубик Нолика)	26 December 2012
55	3	"The Catapult" (Russian: Катапульта)	27 December 2012
56	4	"The Stain" (Russian: Пятно)	19 February 2013
57	5	"The Vent" (Russian: Вентиляция)	21 February 2013
58	6	"Friction" (Russian: Сила трения)	22 March 2013
59	7	"The Pack-o-Mat" (Russian: Помогатор)	28 March 2013
60	8	"The Doorbell" (Russian: Дверной звонок)	2 April 2013
61	9	"The Disguise" (Russian: Маскировка)	4 April 2013
62	10	"The Level" (Russian: Уровень)	2 July 2013
63	11	"The Crowbar" (Russian: Лом)	4 July 2013
64	12	"Modelling Clay" (Russian: Пластилин)	9 July 2013
65	13	"The Globe" (Russian: Глобус)	11 November 2013
66	14	"The Camera" (Russian: Фотоаппарат)	12 November 2013
67	15	"The Barcode" (Russian: Штрих-код)	13 November 2013
68	16	"The Prosthesis" (Russian: Протез)	14 November 2013
69	17	"The Talking Doll" (Russian: Говорящая кукла)	16 November 2013
70	18	"The Chain Reaction" (Russian: Цепная реакция)	11 December 2013
71	19	"The Drum" (Russian: Барабан)	23 December 2013
72	20	"The Kaleidoscope" (Russian: Калейдоскоп)	26 December 2013
73	21	"Tubes" (Russian: Трубы)	27 December 2013
74	22	"The Wires" (Russian: Провода)	5 February 2014
75	23	"GPS" (Russian: Навигатор)	13 February 2014
76	24	"The Armor" (Russian: Доспехи)	13 February 2014
77	25	"The Fire Extinguisher" (Russian: Огнетушитель)	13 February 2014
78	26	"The Clocks" (Russian: Часы)	13 February 2014
79	27	"The Manipulator" (Russian: Манипулятор)	23 February 2014
80	28	"The Video Call" (Russian: Видеосвязь)	24 March 2014
81	29	"Reflexes" (Russian: Рефлексы)	25 March 2014
82	30	"The Oven" (Russian: Духовка)	26 March 2014
83	31	"The Dog" (Russian: Собака)	27 March 2014
84	32	"The Gramophone" (Russian: Граммофон)	7 July 2014
85	33	"The Keycard" (Russian: Ключ-карта)	8 July 2014
86	34	"The Bee" (Russian: Пчела)	9 July 2014
87	35	"The Ecotester" (Russian: Экотестер)	10 July 2014
88	36	"The Airbag" (Russian: Подушка безопасности)	21 August 2014
89	37	"The Instructions" (Russian: Инструкция)	1 September 2014
90	38	"The Shadow Play" (Russian: Театр теней)	1 September 2014
91	39	"Chess" (Russian: Шахматы)	5 September 2014
92	40	"Batteries" (Russian: Батарейки)	17 September 2014
93	41	"The Laboratory" (Russian: Лаборатория)	13 October 2014
94	42	"The Antenna" (Russian: Антенна)	15 October 2014
95	43	"The Tools" (Russian: Инструменты)	16 October 2014
96	44	"Knots" (Russian: Узлы)	15 November 2014
97	45	"The Baby Monitor" (Russian: Радионяня)	16 November 2014
98	46	"The Draftsman" (Russian: Чертёж)	17 December 2014
99	47	"The Fixiphone" (Russian: Фиксифон)	18 December 2014
100	48	"The Elevator" (Russian: Лифт)	4 April 2015
101	49	"The Chick" (Russian: Цыплёнок)	18 April 2015
102	50	"The Motion Sensor" (Russian: Датчик)	1 May 2015
103	51	"Invisible Ink" (Russian: Невидимые чернила)	9 May 2015
104	52	"The Suction Cup" (Russian: Присоска)	16 May 2015

=== Season 3 (2015–20) ===
No. overall	No. in season	Title	Original release date
105	1	"The Spray Can" (Russian: Аэрозоль)	12 June 2015
106	2	"The Movie" (Russian: Кино)	3 August 2015
107	3	"Musical Notes" (Russian: Ноты)	5 September 2015
108	4	"The Constructor Set" (Russian: Конструктор)	19 September 2015
109	5	"Beauty" (Russian: Красота)	1 October 2015
110	6	"The Copy" (Russian: Копия)	17 October 2015
111	7	"The Parrot" (Russian: Попугай)	31 October 2015
112	8	"The Television" (Russian: Телевизор)	28 November 2015
113	9	"The Program" (Russian: Программа)	12 December 2015
114	10	"The Toilet" (Russian: Унитаз)	26 December 2015
115	11	"The Wheel" (Russian: Колесо)	5 March 2016
116	12	"The Germs" (Russian: Микробы)	30 April 2016
117	13	"The Sieve" (Russian: Сито)	23 July 2016
118	14	"The Exercise Machine" (Russian: Тренажёр)	1 September 2016
119	15	"The Umbrella" (Russian: Зонтик)	15 October 2016
120	16	"The Iron" (Russian: Утюг)	12 November 2016
121	17	"Vitamins" (Russian: Витамины)	26 November 2016
122	18	"Chocolate" (Russian: Шоколад)	7 January 2017
123	19	"The Submarine" (Russian: Подводная лодка)	21 January 2017
124	20	"The Spider" (Russian: Паучок)	18 February 2017
125	21	"Money" (Russian: Деньги)	29 April 2017
126	22	"The Bird Feeder" (Russian: Кормушка)	9 June 2017
127	23	"The Backpack" (Russian: Рюкзак)	24 June 2017
128	24	"The Dishwasher" (Russian: Посудомоечная машина)	22 July 2017
129	25	"The Time Machine" (Russian: Машина времени)	19 August 2017
130	26	"The Toothpaste" (Russian: Зубная паста)	22 September 2017
131	27	"The Helicopter" (Russian: Вертолёт)	14 October 2017
132	28	"The Coffeemaker" (Russian: Кофеварка)	11 November 2017
133	29	"The Virus" (Russian: Вирус)	15 December 2017
134	30	"The Fasteners" (Russian: Крепёж)	22 December 2017
135	31	"The Frying Pan" (Russian: Сковородка)	10 February 2018
136	32	"The Window" (Russian: Окно)	2 March 2018
137	33	"Concrete" (Russian: Бетон)	6 April 2018
138	34	"The Blood Test" (Russian: Анализ крови)	8 June 2018
139	35	"The Telescope" (Russian: Телескоп)	6 July 2018
140	36	"The Jewel" (Russian: Драгоценность)	10 August 2018
141	37	"Water" (Russian: Вода)	31 August 2018
142	38	"The Star" (Russian: Звезда)	5 October 2018
143	39	"The Traffic Light" (Russian: Светофор)	2 November 2018
144	40	"The Rock" (Russian: Камень)	7 December 2018
145	41	"The Masquerade" (Russian: Маскарад)	28 December 2018
146	42	"Buttered Bread" (Russian: Бутерброд)	25 January 2019
147	43	"The Detective" (Russian: Детектив)	15 February 2019
148	44	"The Pyramid" (Russian: Пирамида)	1 March 2019
149	45	"The Solar Eclipse" (Russian: Солнечное затмение)	12 April 2019
150	46	"The Heart" (Russian: Сердце)	24 March 2019
151	47	"The Pencil" (Russian: Карандаш)	28 June 2019
152	48	"The Baby Doll" (Russian: Пупс)	1 August 2019
153	49	"Glue" (Russian: Клей)	30 August 2019
154	50	"Hockey" (Russian: Хоккей)	4 October 2019
155	51	"Plastic" (Russian: Пластик)	1 November 2019
156	52	"The Button" (Russian: Пуговица)	6 December 2019
157	53	"The Marshmallow" (Russian: Зефир)	26 December 2019

=== Season 4: Newcomers (2020–22) ===
No. overall	No. in season	Title	Original release date
158	1	"The Piano" (Russian: Пианино)	20 February 2020
159	2	"The Parachute" (Russian: Парашют)	27 March 2020
160	3	"The Hook" (Russian: Крючок)	24 April 2020
161	4	"The 3D Printer" (Russian: 3D-принтер)	22 May 2020
162	5	"The Tooth" (Russian: Зуб)	10 June 2020
163	6	"Dancing" (Russian: Танцы)	17 July 2020
164	7	"The Photo Editor" (Russian: Фоторедактор)	24 August 2020
165	8	"The Trampoline" (Russian: Батут)	24 August 2020
166	9	"The Secret Code" (Russian: Шифр)	28 August 2020
167	10	"The Present" (Russian: Подарок)	13 September 2020
168	11	"The Bones" (Russian: Кости)	25 September 2020
169	12	"The Eraser" (Russian: Ластик)	18 October 2020
170	13	"The Autopilot" (Russian: Автопилот)	1 November 2020
171	14	"Trash" (Russian: Мусор)	6 November 2020
172	15	"Perpetual Motion" (Russian: Вечный двигатель)	15 November 2020
173	16	"Energy" (Russian: Энергия)	27 November 2020
174	17	"The Online Store" (Russian: Интернет-магазин)	13 December 2020
175	18	"The Sleigh" (Russian: Санки)	25 December 2020
176	19	"The X-ray" (Russian: Рентген)	17 January 2021
177	20	"The Touch Screen" (Russian: Сенсорный экран)	31 January 2021
178	21	"Saving Energy" (Russian: Энергосбережение)	9 February 2021
179	22	"The Birthday" (Russian: День рождения)	21 February 2021
180	23	"The Hiccups" (Russian: Икота)	14 March 2021
181	24	"Memory" (Russian: Память)	28 March 2021
182	25	"The Shirt" (Russian: Рубашка)	23 April 2021
183	26	"The Air Conditioner" (Russian: Кондиционер)	30 April 2021
184	27	"Comics" (Russian: Комикс)	16 May 2021
185	28	"The Roller Coaster" (Russian: Аттракцион)	30 May 2021
186	29	"Hide and Seek" (Russian: Прятки)	13 June 2021
187	30	"Plaster" (Russian: Гипс)	30 August 2021
188	31	"The Cheat Sheet" (Russian: Шпаргалка)	27 August 2021
189	32	"The Safety Harness" (Russian: Страховка)	27 August 2021
190	33	"The Contacts" (Russian: Контакт)	27 August 2021
191	34	"The Hoverboard" (Russian: Гироскутер)	10 September 2021
192	35	"The Sneakers" (Russian: Кроссовки)	24 September 2021
193	36	"Virtual Reality" (Russian: Виртуальная реальность)	15 October 2021
194	37	"The Tower" (Russian: Башня)	29 October 2021
195	38	"The Guitar" (Russian: Гитара)	12 November 2021
196	39	"The Hologram" (Russian: Голограмма)	26 November 2021
197	40	"The Weather Station" (Russian: Метеостанция)	10 December 2021
198	41	"The Voice Assistant" (Russian: Голосовой помощник)	24 December 2021
199	42	"Snow" (Russian: Снег)	31 December 2021
200	43	"The Pump" (Russian: Насос)	10 January 2022
201	44	"The Flytrap" (Russian: Мухоловка)	28 January 2022
202	45	"The Quadcopter" (Russian: Квадрокоптер)	4 February 2022
203	46	"The Swing" (Russian: Качели)	18 February 2022
204	47	"The Book" (Russian: Книга)	4 March 2022
205	48	"The Headphones" (Russian: Наушники)	18 March 2022
206	49	"Charging" (Russian: Зарядка)	1 April 2022
207	50	"The Computer" (Russian: Компьютер)	15 April 2022
208	51	"The Recording" (Russian: Фонограмма)	29 April 2022
209	52	"The Battle (Note: Not officially released in English for unknown reasons.)" (Russian: Поединок)	13 May 2022
210	53	"The Aeroplane" (Russian: Самолёт)	18 November 2022

=== Season 5: High Five! (2022–24) ===
No. overall	No. in season	Title	Original release date
211	1	"The Museum" (Russian: Музей)	1 December 2022
212	2	"The Crystal" (Russian: Кристалл)	1 December 2022
213	3	"Home" (Russian: Дом)	8 December 2022
214	4	"Tour Guide" (Russian: Экскурсия)	15 December 2022
215	5	"The Turnstile" (Russian: Турникет)	22 December 2022
216	6	"Christmas Tree" (Russian: Ёлка)	31 December 2022
217	7	"The Multicooker" (Russian: Мультиварка)	26 January 2023
218	8	"The Robot Vacuum" (Russian: Робот-пылесос)	9 February 2023
219	9	"The Crane" (Russian: Подъёмный кран)	23 February 2023
220	10	"Glasses" (Russian: Очки)	9 March 2023
221	11	"Telekinesis" (Russian: Телекинез)	23 March 2023
222	12	"Skeletons" (Russian: Скелет)	6 April 2023
223	13	"The Vacuum" (Russian: Вакуум)	20 April 2023
224	14	"The Profile" (Russian: Профиль)	4 May 2023
225	15	"The Discoverers" (Russian: Открытие)	18 May 2023
226	16	"The Tram" (Russian: Трамвай)	1 June 2023
227	17	"Bandages" (Russian: Бинт)	15 June 2023
228	18	"The Painting" (Russian: Картина)	29 June 2023
229	19	"The Transformer" (Russian: Трансформатор)	13 July 2023
230	20	"Origami" (Russian: Оригами)	27 July 2023
231	21	"Horsepower" (Russian: Лошадиные силы)	10 August 2023
232	22	"The Princess and the Office Chair" (Russian: Принцесса)	24 August 2023
233	23	"Mars Rover" (Russian: Марсоход)	7 September 2023
234	24	"The Butterfly" (Russian: Бабочка)	5 October 2023
235	25	"The Knight" (Russian: Рыцарь)	19 October 2023
236	26	"The House Spirit" (Russian: Домовой)	19 October 2023
237	27	"The Steam Train" (Russian: Паровоз)	16 November 2023
238	28	"The Quest" (Russian: Квест)	30 November 2023
239	29	"DNA" (Russian: ДНК)	14 December 2023
240	30	"The Christmas Surprise" (Russian: Хлопушка)	28 December 2023
241	31	"The Record" (Russian: Рекорд)	18 January 2024
242	32	"The Paint Gun" (Russian: Краскопульт)	25 January 2024
243	33	"The Calendar" (Russian: Календарь)	8 February 2024
244	34	"Smartphone" (Russian: Смартфон)	22 February 2024
245	35	"Spiders at School" (Russian: Паутина)	7 March 2024
246	36	"Growing Up" (Russian: Рост)	21 March 2024
247	37	"Radiators" (Russian: Радиатор)	4 April 2024
248	38	"Hiking" (Russian: Поход)	2 May 2024
249	39	"Boomerang" (Russian: Бумеранг)	27 June 2024
250	40	"Apples" (Russian: Яблоко)	11 July 2024
251	41	"Heads or Tails" (Russian: Жребий)	25 July 2024
252	42	"Volleyball" (Russian: Волейбол)	8 August 2024
253	43	"The Teacher" (Russian: Учитель)	5 September 2024
254	44	"Time to Refuel" (Russian: Заправка)	19 September 2024
255	45	"Twins" (Russian: Близнецы)	3 October 2024
256	46	"The Satellite" (Russian: Спутник)	3 October 2024
257	47	"Theremin" (Russian: Терменвокс)	17 October 2024
258	48	"The Fitness Tracker" (Russian: Фитнес-браслет)	31 October 2024
259	49	"The Jumpsuit" (Russian: Комбинезон)	14 November 2024
260	50	"The Disco" (Russian: Дискотека)	28 November 2024
261	51	"The Skyscope" (Russian: Секрет)	12 December 2024
262	52	"The Grand Opening" (Russian: Репортаж)	26 December 2024

=== Season 6: It's Time! (2025–27) ===
No. overall	No. in season	Title	Original release date
263	1	"The Material" (Russian: Материя)	29 November 2025
264	2	"The Invention" (Russian: Изобретение)	29 November 2025
265	3	"Tsiolkovsky" (Russian: Циолковский)	29 November 2025
266	4	"The Sofa" (Russian: Диван)	29 November 2025
267	5	"The Ice Age" (Russian: Ледниковый период)	29 November 2025
268	6	"The Lightning Rod" (Russian: Молниеотвод)	29 November 2025
269	7	"Typewriter" (Russian: Печатная машинка)	27 September 2025
270	8	"Vikings" (Russian: Викинги)	27 September 2025
271	9	"The Train Driver" (Russian: Машинист)	11 December 2025
272	10	"The Mine" (Russian: Шахта)	5 February 2026
273	11	"The Windmill" (Russian: Ветряная мельница)	5 February 2026
274	12	"The Suit" (Russian: Скафандр)	5 February 2026
275	13	"The Artist" (Russian: Артист)	5 February 2026
276	14	"Bubbles" (Russian: Пузырьки)	5 February 2026
277	15	"The Soil" (Russian: Почва)	5 February 2026
278	16	"Patent" (Russian: Патент)	5 February 2026
279	17	"The Icebreaker" (Russian: Ледокол)	5 February 2026
280	18	"The Perfume" (Russian: Парфюм)	5 February 2026
281	19	"Terracotta" (Russian: Терракота)	5 February 2026
282	20	"Face Recognition" (Russian: Распознавание лиц)	20 April 2026
283	21	"The Car" (Russian: Машинка)	20 April 2026
284	22	"The Kite" (Russian: Воздушный змей)	20 April 2026
285	23	"Irrigation" (Russian: Ирригация)	20 April 2026
286	24	"Ice Cream" (Russian: Мороженое)	20 April 2026
287	25	"Ig Nobel Prize" (Russian: Шнобелевская премия)	20 April 2026
288	26	"Sugar" (Russian: Сахар)	20 April 2026
289	27	"Chroma Key" (Russian: Хромакей)	20 April 2026
290	28	"The Scroll" (Russian: Свиток)	5 August 2026
291	29	"Biomimetics" (Russian: Биомиметика)	5 August 2026
292	30	"Tetris" (Russian: Тетрис)	6 August 2026
293	31	"Spinning Wheel" (Russian: Прялка)	7 August 2026
294	32	"The Brake Pads" (Russian: Тормозные колодки)	8 August 2026
295	33	"The Library" (Russian: Библиотека)	9 August 2026
296	34	"Chips" (Russian: Чипсы)	10 August 2026
297	35	"Yurt" (Russian: Юрта)	11 August 2026
298	36	"Pythagoras" (Russian: Пифагор)	12 August 2026
299	37	"The Goldberg Machine" (Russian: Машина Голдберга)	2 September 2026
300	38	"The Anniversary" (Russian: Юбилей)	3 September 2026
301	39	"Pipistrelle" (Russian: Пипидастр)	28 September 2026
302	40	"The Future City" (Russian: Город будущего)	29 September 2026
303	41	"Harmony" (Russian: Гармония)	30 September 2026
304	42	"The Jeans" (Russian: Джинсы)	30 October 2026
305	43	"Atmospheric pressure" (Russian: Атмосферное давление)	30 October 2026
306	44	"The Dubai Chocolate"	TBA
307	45	"The Storm"	TBA
308	46	"The Copycat"	TBA
309	47	"The Time"	TBA
310	48	"The Dove"	TBA
311	49	"WiFi"	TBA
312	50	"The Pharaoh"	TBA
313	51	"The Police"	TBA
314	52	"The Drawing"	TBA

== Films (2017–27) ==
Title	Directed by	Original release date
"The Fixies: Top Secret" (Russian: Фиксики: Большой секрет)	Vasiko Bedoshvili & Andrey Kolpin & Ivan Pshonkin	28 October 2017
"Fixies vs. Crabots" (Russian: Фиксики против кработов)	Oleg Uzhinov & Vasiko Bedoshvili & Ivan Pshonkin	21 December 2019
"The Fixies: Guardians of the Earth" (Russian: Фиксики и инопланетяне)	Boris Chertkov & Ivan Pshonkin	12 August 2027
