= Russia-2 =

Russian television channel

Russia-2 Россия-2
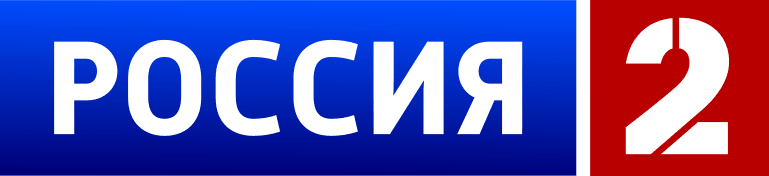
- Country: Russia
- Network: VGTRK
- Headquarters: Moscow, Russia

Programming
- Language: Russian
- Picture format: 576i 4:3 (SDTV)

Ownership
- Owner: Russian Government
- Sister channels: Russia-1, Russia-K, Russia-24

History
- Launched: 12 June 2003; 23 years ago
- Replaced: TVS
- Closed: 1 November 2015; 10 years ago
- Replaced by: Match TV (Russia)
- Former names: RTR-Sport (2003-2010)

Links
- Website: http://russia2.tv/

Availability

Terrestrial
- Analogue: Various
- Digital: Channel 3

Russia-2 (Russian: Россия-2) was a Russian television channel operated by VGTRK. It primarily broadcast sport.

Between 2007 and 2009 during the daytime, it broadcast the children's channel called Bibigon.

Before 1 January 2010, it was known as Sport, but since then it was re-branded due to a broadened format.

On 1 November 2015 the channel was closed and its broadcasting frequency was taken by a new sports television channel Match TV.

== Programmes ==
=== News and current affairs ===
- Bol`shoy sport (Big sport) — sports news.

=== Documentaries ===
- Moya Planeta (My Planet) - blocks of programmes from Moya Planeta.
- Nauka 2.0 (Science 2.0) - blocks of programmes from Nauka 2.0.

=== Others ===
- Feature films (thrillers and adventures)
- 90x60x90 (entertainment)

=== Sports events broadcast by channel ===
- Biathlon World Cup
- FIA Formula One World Championship
- KHL
- Premier League
- Russian Premier League
- The FA Cup
- M-1 Global, UFC, Bellator MMA, ONE Championship, and other MMA Promotions
