= Bibigon's Adventures =

Russian literary fairy-tale

Bibigon's Adventures (Russian: Приключения Бибигона) is a literary fairy tale by Russian children's writer Korney Chukovsky. Bibigon is a mischievous thumb-sized midget boy who lives in Korney Chukovsky's dacha and claims he fell from the Moon and calls himself "Count Bibigon de Lilliput".

== History ==
Bibigon was the last children's fairy tale of Chukovsky written after a long hiatus caused by the death of tuberculosis of the youngest Chukovsky's daughter Mura (Maria), 11 years old. Written as a mixture of prose and verse, the tale was first serialized in children's magazine Murzilka during 1945-1946, then the publication was stopped, due to the surge of the Soviet ideological censorship known as Zhdanovshchina. The tale was accused of being "an obvious delirium", absurd, and nonsense under the guise of a fairy tale, lacking didactic values and ideology. The newspaper Pravda, the official organ of the Communist Party of the Soviet Union published a scathing overview titled "Serious Flaws of Children's Magazines". In particular, Bibigon's comical and absurd adventures were called "idiocies" and Bibigon himself was called a repulsive little freak, both boastful and cowardly. Detgiz, the publisher of Murzilka, scolded in the review, expressed a "deep regret" for publishing Bibigon.

The finished tale was published in 1956 as a separate book, in heavily censored form, and the complete tale was published in 1963.

== Cultural influence ==
In 1981 a puppet animated film Bibigon was released. The film received several awards.
