= Russia-24 =

Russian TV news channel

Russia-24 Россия-24
- Country: Russia
- Broadcast area: Worldwide
- Network: VGTRK
- Headquarters: Moscow, Russia

Programming
- Language: Russian
- Picture format: 576i SDTV

Ownership
- Owner: Russian government
- Sister channels: Russia-1, Russia-2, Russia-K, Carousel, RTR-Planeta

History
- Launched: 1 July 2006; 20 years ago
- Former names: Vesti (2006–2010)

Links
- Website: https://vesti.ru/

Availability

Terrestrial
- Digital terrestrial television: Channel 7

Streaming media
- russia.tv: Russia 24. Live
- Smotrim: smotrim.ru/channel/3

Russia-24 (Russian: Россия-24, romanized: Rossiya-24) is a state-owned Russian-language news channel from Russia. It covers major national and international events and focuses on domestic issues. It is owned by VGTRK.

== History ==
The broadcast began July 1, 2006 in Russia, February 7, 2007 on the West Coast of the United States, May 19, 2008 in Serbia, and October 9, 2008 in Kyrgyzstan. VGTRK Crimea started broadcasting on March 10, 2014.

The editor-in-chief of the channel is Evgeny Bekasov (since 2012).

The channel ostensibly aims to give a broad and impartial outline of life in all of Russia’s regions from its European exclave of Kaliningrad to Vladivostok in the Far East. The channel was named Vesti until 1 January 2010, when the public-owned VGTRK rebranded its channels.

Russia-24 was banned in Ukraine, Moldova, the United Kingdom, and the European Union as a result of the 2022 Russian invasion of Ukraine. The channel falsely claimed that the Bucha massacre was staged and suggested that footage of actors placing mannequins on a film set in St. Petersburg were Ukrainian soldiers using the mannequins to "pass it off as a corpse".

The United Kingdom and Australia imposed sanctions upon Evgeniy Poddubny, one of the top war correspondents and propagandists of Russia-24.

== Criticism ==
After the channel was created, most experts said that the channel was a political project and would influence public opinion before the parliamentary and presidential elections in 2007 and 2008. However, in the late 2000s, TV critics talked about the high professional level of the channel.

=== The 2011 election scandal ===
In 2011, during the elections to the State Duma, the Rossiya 24 channel showed footage from the scoreboard, on which the total percentage of votes for all parties cast in the Rostov region exceeded 146%.

The head of the Rostov regional election commission, Sergei Yusov, said that these data are not related to the official data of the Central Election Commission. According to Yusov:

"Firstly, the Central Election Commission had a completely different layout of the scoreboard, on which the numbers were running, and secondly, all political parties were arranged strictly in the order in which they were placed on the ballot."

The management of the Rossiya 24 channel did not respond to these accusations in any way.

According to VGTRK cameraman Leonid Krivenkov, who worked for the TV channel for several years (and worked on election day in the same studio with TV presenters Ivan Kudryavtsev and Anna Schneider, who announced a total of 146% of the vote), a question came from the Kremlin to Rossiya-24: what percentages for United Russia should be shown on the news. The editor-in-chief asked: "But what about the other parties?", to which I received an answer: "And show other parties the percentage they actually scored.

=== Facts of falsifications in information programs ===
Against the background of the end of the 2013 Georgian presidential election, Natalia Litovko, a TV channel journalist In the program Facts dedicated to this event, she spoke about the results of Mikhail Saakashvili's presidency. The presenter stated that from 2002 to 2013, Georgia's GDP decreased 3 times (from $16 billion to $5 billion), according to international experts, corruption increased in the country, and unemployment increased from 12.5% to 15% during this period. However, the figures stated in the broadcast did not correspond to reality.: The country's GDP, according to the IMF, grew from 3.4 to 15.9 billion dollars, in the corruption perception index Transparency International (TI) Georgia has risen from 85th place to 52nd during this period. At the same time, according to Artyom Tsirin, the objectivity of this rating is questionable. There is also evidence that TI is engaged in "destructive activities" with the National Endowment for Democracy.

On March 1, 2014, a story about an alleged shootout in Simferopol was shown on the TV channel. It showed "Ukrainian militants" with their faces covered and the bodies of Russian soldiers lying motionless on the ground. The audience noticed that the Bandera fighters shown were armed with the latest Russian AK 100-series assault rifles (the export version of the AK74M, developed in 1994, used in a number of CIS countries and abroad) and RG-94 grenade launchers, and there were no traces of blood under the "corpses" of the Russian military in camouflage. The witnesses of the filming of the report, the crew of the Crimean Tatar TV channel ATR, were beaten by unknown persons while clarifying the events of the "shootout". According to Crimean Tatar journalists there were, in fact, no human casualties as a result of the shooting.

In June 2024, against the backdrop of the Russian invasion of Ukraine, the TV channel showed a drone video of a soldier on the battlefield shooting in the head a colleague who had previously been injured in a kamikaze drone attack. Presenter Anastasia Ivanova said that the video was filmed by the Armed Forces of Ukraine. However, experts and journalists later determined that the videos showed Russian military personnel, not Ukrainian ones.

=== Viktor Shenderovich ===
On February 11, 2014, the Rossiya-24 TV channel dedicated a seven-minute episode of the Vesti at 23:00 program. The satirist Viktor Shenderovich and his post about the Sochi Olympics, in which the author compared figure skater Yulia Lipnitskaya to the 1936 German Olympic champion Hans Welke. In the fourth minute of the broadcast, a comment was made by the former press secretary of the Nashi movement, Kristina Potupchik, introduced as a "blogger". Against the background of her comment, footage of compromising material on Shenderovich was shown, filmed with a hidden camera in 2010. At that time, National Bolshevik leader Eduard Limonov, former DPNI leader Alexander Belov, political scientist Dmitry Oreshkin, editor-in-chief of Russian Newsweek magazine Mikhail Fishman and politician Ilya Yashin were also filmed under various compromising circumstances, demanding that the organizers and perpetrators be found and brought to justice.

According to political scientist Fyodor Krasheninnikov, the live demonstration of a video taken by a hidden camera and invading the privacy of an ordinary person (who is neither an official nor a politician) indicates panic among journalists.

=== Coverage of events in Ukraine ===
According to Elizaveta Surganova and Konstantin Benyumov, the authors of the publication "Lenta.In 2014, during the coverage of events in Ukraine, Rossiya-24 moved away from a neutral position. So, in her broadcast, she reported that provocateurs are operating on the Maidan, and the Berkut units are "the only thing that prevents this from escalating into a civil war." Despite the fact that the invited experts acknowledged the presence of peaceful protesters in Kiev, Rossiya-24 dubbed all those killed on February 20 as militants. The TV channel's journalist noted that he did not understand why their bodies were photographed and shown on the air by the Ukrainian media, but added that "perhaps in this way they are trying to arouse the pity of Western politicians." At the same time, the TV channel accused foreign media of distorting and putting pressure on the Ukrainian authorities, who, according to journalists, only talk about casualties among the protesters and blame the Ukrainian leadership for the deaths.

On February 20, 2014, during the coverage of Euromaidan, journalists asked Leonid Pilunsky, deputy of the Supreme Council of the Autonomous Republic of Crimea (Deputy chairman of the Kurultai-Rukh faction), for a comment on the situation in Crimea. The opposition MP criticized the ruling "Party of Regions" and pointed out that there are no riots in the autonomy and only local authorities are engaged in escalating the situation. After a minute and a half, his speech disappeared from the air in the middle of the phrase, and the stammering presenter explained this by communication problems. The Crimean parliamentarian himself later said that during a conversation with him, the TV crew "just hung up without explaining anything." In his opinion, this indicates that Moscow "does not want to hear the truth."

On March 3, 2014, Russian musician Boris Grebenshchikov expressed his dissatisfaction on his Facebook page that the Rossiya-24 TV channel used part of his song "Train on Fire" in a story about Ukraine, reproaching the channel's journalists for "hating some for the sake of others" and playing into the hands of the devil.

On June 12, 2014, in a report on the shelling of the village of Semenovka with phosphorus incendiary shells, the TV channel used footage from a CNN 2004 report on the bombing of Fallujah by US troops.

On February 23, 2014, the TV channel aired the program Opinion, during which Russian publicist and public figure Alexander Prokhanov and TV presenter Evelina Zakamskaya discussed protest actions in Ukraine. Alexander Prokhanov pointed out that he finds it strange that Russian and European Jewish organizations support Euromaidan. He called their behavior blindness, comparing it to the fact that in Europe before 1933, "many supported the Fuhrer," and now "they are bringing the second Holocaust closer with their own hands." To this remark, Evelina Zakamskaya, nodding in agreement, added: "They also brought the first one closer in the same way." Deputies of the Legislative Assembly of St. Petersburg from the Yabloko faction Boris Vishnevsky and Alexander Kobrinsky sent a letter to the head of the Rossiya-24 TV channel, where they demanded at least a public apology for what happened in the program. The letter also states that the presenter's statement may fall under the law on countering extremism and the Criminal Code of the Russian Federation. According to Pavel Gutiontov, secretary of the Union of Journalists of Russia, it would be more correct to punish not the presenter, but those who determine the channel's policy. As of 2015, Zakamskaya continued to be the host of the Russia 24 channel. On April 10, 2015, she attended the youth forum "My City is My Ryazan" at Ryazan State University, where she said that in conditions of hard work, you can "not betray your inner beliefs" and "always follow the truth."

==== Prohibition of broadcasting on the territory of Ukraine ====
In the summer of 2014, the National Council of Ukraine for Television and Radio Broadcasting announced that the content of the programs of Russian channels, in particular Channel One (Channel One. Worldwide Network"), "Russia-1" ("RTR-Planet"), "NTV" ("NTV World"), "TNT", "Fifth Channel", "REN TV", "TV Center" ("TVCi"), "RBC", "Zvezda", RT, Rossiya-24, LifeNews, does not comply with the requirements of the European Convention on Transnational Television and Part 1 of art. 42 of the Law of Ukraine "On Television and Radio Broadcasting", thereby prohibiting their broadcast throughout Ukraine, with the exception of the Autonomous Republic of Crimea and Sevastopol.

The restriction of broadcasting of Russian channels in Ukraine has been criticized both by the Russian leadership and by the channels themselves. The Russian Foreign Ministry called the shutdown of Russian TV channels an attack on media freedom, and Konstantin Ernst, CEO of Channel One, called on the Ukrainian authorities to reverse the decision, "contrary to the norms of international law and the interests of subscribers." This decision was also ambiguously received in Europe. Thus, the OSCE representative on freedom of the Media Dunja Mijatovic called the suspension of broadcasting a restriction on freedom of speech. However, Mijatovic later stated that such a practice could be justified if it served to "protect fundamental values." The Russian Foreign Ministry called on Mijatovic to avoid double standards and a selective approach in her work.

=== Deportation of journalists ===
In March 2016, the TV channel's crew, without accreditation, attended the Free Russia Forum in Vilnius, Lithuania, and behaved incorrectly towards its participants, and the organizers had to call the police. The police were called, and four Russian journalists were eventually added to the list of undesirable persons and expelled from the country with a ban on re-entry. In December 2019, the ECHR rejected the complaint of Russian journalists (Zarubin and Others v. Lithuania) against the actions of Lithuania, whose authorities were able to demonstrate the necessity and proportionality of these measures to national security issues.

== Awards ==
- November 18, 2008 — the TV channel became the winner of the "Best TV Company of the Year" competition held by the National Association of Television and Radio Broadcasters.
- September 26, 2009 — the TV channel became the winner of the TEFI—2009 award in the nomination "Special Prize of the Academy of Russian Television".
- October 15, 2009 — the TV channel became the winner of the Golden Ray Award in the Information Channel nomination.
- November 20, 2009 — at the Hot Bird TV Awards ceremony, the channel received a special Eutelsat prize.
- December 9, 2012 — the TV channel became the winner of the All-Russian journalism competition within the framework of the IV All-Russian Festival on safety and rescue of people of the Russian Ministry of Emergency Situations "Constellation of Courage" in the nomination "Best documentary or reportage" for the film Moscow, Ministry of Emergency Situations. How It All Started.
- December 6, 2013 — the winners of the All—Russian journalism competition within the framework of the V All—Russian Festival on the safety and rescue of people of the Ministry of Emergency Situations of Russia "Constellation of Courage" were: in the nomination "For professional coverage of the activities of the Ministry of Emergency Situations of the Russian Federation" - editor-in-chief Evgeny Bekasov, in the nomination "For professional journalistic qualities and information support of the Ministry of Emergency Situations of the Russian Federation" - journalist and the presenter Ekaterina Grinchevskaya.
- July 2, 2015 — Editor-in—chief Evgeny Bekasov became the winner of the National Award "Media Manager of Russia - 2015" in the nomination "Electronic Media".

== Logo history ==
First logo (as Vesti, 2006–2007)

Second logo (as Vesti, 2007–2009)

Тhird logo (2010–2011)
