= RTR-Planeta =

Russian international television channel

RTR-Planeta/Russia-RTR PTP-Планета/Россиа-РТР
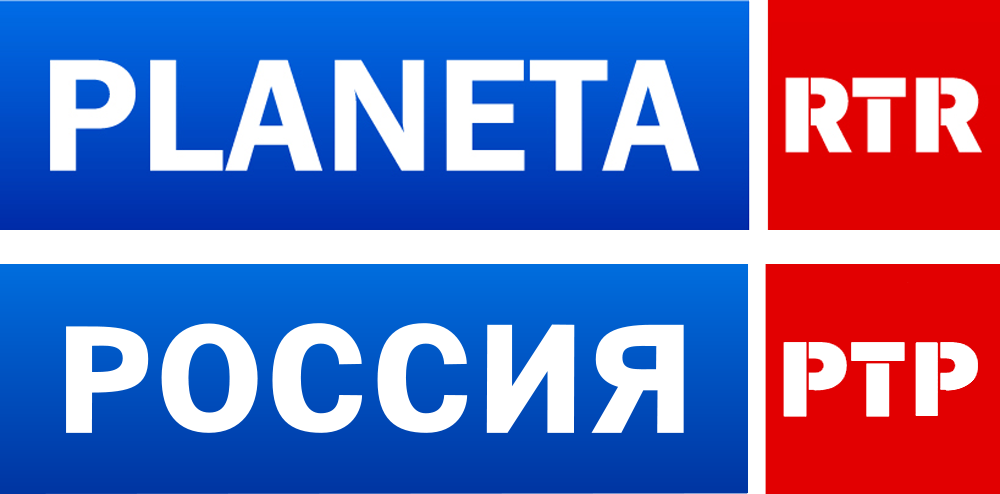
- Country: Russia
- Broadcast area: Russia, Central Asia, Central and Eastern Europe, North America, Southeast Asia, Middle East, Western Europe, Nordic Regions, Sub-Saharan Africa and until 2015 the Baltic countries.
- Network: VGTRK
- Headquarters: Moscow, Russia

Programming
- Languages: Russian; English (subtitles)
- Picture format: 1080i HDTV (downscaled to 576i for the SDTV feed)

Ownership
- Owner: VGTRK
- Sister channels: Carousel International (TV channel)

History
- Launched: July 1, 2002; 24 years ago
- Closed: April 2015 (Lithuania) January 2019 (Lavita) April 2022 (EU)

Links
- Website: www.rtr-planeta.com

Availability

Streaming media
- russia.tv: RTR Planeta Live
- Smotrim: smotrim.ru/channel/512

RTR-Planeta (Rossiyskoe televidenie i radio - Planeta, Russian: PTP-Планета, Российское телевидение и радио — Планета) is the international TV channel of VGTRK, a state-owned broadcaster in Russia. It is available worldwide via cable and satellite as Россия РТР (Russia RTR) for the CIS countries and the Asia-Pacific region, and as Planeta RTR for other countries, referred to on air as RTR.

== History ==
On June 30, 2002, VGTRK executive Oleg Dobrodeev announced the creation of RTR-Planeta, targeted towards Western Europe and the Middle East with plans to launch in North America by autumn. According to Dobrodeev, RTR-Planeta wasn't "a commercial project", meaning that there would be no commercial advertising "for the time being". The channel launched on July 1, 2002 via the Express-3A satellite. Programming included morning relays of Euronews, RTR's programming (including Vesti's editions, its TV series and movies), as well as some programming from Kultura. The channel was financed by VGTRK's internal reserves and did not receive funding from the State. The Russian version of the channel aired with foreign advertising.

In October 2003, the channel started broadcasting in Ukraine, replacing Channel One Russia Worldwide for low-income cable subscriptions (free tiers) in the capital. The new channel obeyed Ukrainian laws of the time, including advertising laws which forbade advertising of tobacco and alcohol, but had not adopted the local content rating system. VGTRK claimed that it had more "favorable conditions" than Channel One on the basic cable packages, much to Channel One's annoyance. The main RTR channel was still broadcast illegally in some areas.

On June 1, 2004, the channel started broadcasting in Moldova replacing the Russia-1 channel, thanks to a new agreement with local company TeleDixi. The Russia-1 channel was in high demand, but the switch to RTR-Planeta became necessary due to rights issues. The company ceased carrying RTR-Planeta on June 3, 2005, as it had signed an agreement with STS.

On December 29, 2005, it was announced that, beginning on January 1, 2006, 25 Russian channels would be removed from cable networks in Tallinn, among them RTR-Planeta. Between January 2 and 4, the channel was unavailable in Estonia.

On March 11, 2006, an edition of Formula of Power featuring the President of Ukraine Viktor Yushchenko was removed from the Russian channel; instead, an interview with the Prime Minister of India Manmohan Singh was shown. The interview with Yushchenko, however, was shown on RTR-Planeta. On April 15, 2006, it was made available on the basic package of the Ukrainian cable company Volia.

It was reported on December 26, 2009 that authorities in Azerbaijan would switch off the channel within the country on January 1, 2010. The official reason for the move was the shutdown of Russian television channels to potentiate the local television industry; however, it was also believed that this was an attempt to silence media coverage of the Nagorno-Karabakh conflict. On July 10, 2007, the carriage of the channel in Azerbaijan was extended by one month; on August 20, this was extended to the start of September. The channel was turned off on January 1, 2008 in Azerbaijan, due to a lack of an agreement otherwise. On January 22, the chairman of the National Council of Azerbaijan on Television and Radio, Nushiravan Maharramov, stated that the TV channel broadcast would be restored if Russia, in exchange, broadcast an Azerbaijani channel within a territory equal in area to Azerbaijan.

On May 29, 2008, the National Television Company of Ukraine expressed its intention to seek removal of RTR-Planeta's license due to the broadcast of that year's Eurovision Song Contest held in Serbia in parallel with the First National Channel, which owned exclusive rights to broadcast it in the country.

On July 1, 2008, the Minsk television company Capital TV launched RTR-Belarus in Belarus, based on the version of RTR-Planeta in CIS countries. Before this, the country had broadcast the Russian version with local advertising and some of its own content.

On July 22, 2008, The National Council of Ukraine on Television and Radio Broadcasting warned several Russian channels, including RTR-Planeta, of its intention to assess the legality of their presence on Ukrainian cable networks. On August 8, 2008, carriage stopped in Tbilisi, and the following day, to all of Georgia.

In September 2008, RTR-Planeta began broadcasting in Belarus as part of the "Premiere" package of Zala, the IPTV service of the operator Beltelecom.

The channel's suspension in Tajikistan was announced on January 21, 2009. VGTRK owed 4,8 million rubles for technical services in Tajikistan, as well as for the increased cost in electricity bills. A version for the Baltic states was launched on February 2, 2009.

== Broadcasting ==
RTR-Planeta is the only provider of Russian-language programming to the Asia-Pacific region covered by the AsiaSat 2 satellite, utilizing IPTV, ADSL and other advanced network technologies.

In October 2009 a separate version of the TV channel was created to broadcast via the Eutelsat 36A satellite to Ukrainian TV viewers. This was due to a November 1, 2008 demand from the Ukrainian Television and Radio Broadcasting Council for Ukrainian cable operators to remove Russian TV channels that did not adopt the Ukrainian legislation from their broadcasting lists. The decision affected, in particular, RTR-Planeta, Channel One and TV Center.

On May 1, 2010, RTR-Planeta returned to Ukrainian cable networks.

=== Bans ===
- Lithuania: In April 2015 RTR-Planeta's broadcasts were blocked for three months in Lithuania due to transmitting "propagation of violence and instigation of war". Lithuania's Radio and Television Commission stated that RTR-Planeta “portrayed Ukrainian people as enemies of Russia and showed contempt for Ukraine's territorial integrity”.
- Latvia: On January 31, 2019, RTR-Planeta's broadcasts were blocked for three months in Latvia because of transmitting "propaganda and hate speeches, that were considered encouraging violence", with some of the hate speeches reportedly “encouraging viewers to hang Ukrainians over their political views.” This was the second time the channel received a ban in Latvia, the previous time being in 2016, when the channel was accused of spreading false information.
- European Union: At the end of April 2022, the EU Commission announced that there would be sanctions against Russian TV channels transmitted to Europe via satellite and rebroadcasting, as a consequence of the Russian invasion of Ukraine. According to politico.eu, Rossiya RTR/RTR-Planeta, Rossiya 24 and TV Centre International would be sanctioned in an effort to curtail Russian propaganda. On 3 June 2022, the ban was enacted as part of the sixth package of sanctions from the EU.
