= Russia-K =

Russian cultural television channel

Russia-Cultura Россия-Культура
- Country: Russia
- Broadcast area: Russia; Worldwide
- Network: VGTRK
- Headquarters: Moscow, Russia

Programming
- Language: Russian
- Picture format: 576i (SDTV); 1080i (HDTV)

Ownership
- Owner: Russian Government
- Sister channels: Russia-1, Russia-24, Carousel, RTR Planeta

History
- Launched: November 1, 1997
- Former names: RTR-2 (August 25 — October 31, 1997); Kultura (November 1, 1997 — December 31, 2009)

Links
- Website: smotrim.ru/pick/kultura

Availability

Terrestrial
- Analogue: Channel 6 (Limited coverage for St Petersburg except the rest of Russia)
- Digital: Channel 6

Streaming media
- CytaVision: Channel 18 SD; Channel 31 HD

Russia-K (Russian: Россия Культура, romanized: Rossiya Kul'tura "Russia - Culture") is a Russian national not-for-profit television channel that broadcasts shows regarding arts and culture. It belongs to the state-controlled VGTRK group.

== History ==
The creation of Kultura channel was authorised on 25 August 1997 after the presidential Decree No. 919 was signed by Boris Yeltsin. Its creation was supported by Mstislav Rostropovich, Dmitry Likhachyov, Rolan Bykov and other public figures. Mikhail Shvydkoy became the first editor-in-chief of Kultura. The channel began broadcasting on 1 November 1997 at 10:00 AM. At the stage of launching, it was planned that it would be called "RTR-2" (while RTR was labeled as RTR-1). The corresponding logo was briefly used in a number of printed TV programs, while the stylized "K" letter was used as the logo from the beginning of broadcast.

The channel was rebranded as Russia-Culture (Rossiya-K) on 1 January 2010 along with three other main channels of the VGTRK group.

The channel re-transmitted Euronews European news channel from 2 October 2001 to 3 September 2017. From 2007 until 2010, it broadcast children's programming produced by Bibigon. Sergey Shumakov has been the editor-in-chief since 2009. The TV channel does not broadcast advertisements, but it promotes cultural events.

=== 1997–2001: The Beginning of Broadcasting ===
The "Kultura" TV channel began broadcasting on November 1, 1997, at 10:00 Moscow Time. It was initially distributed through the network of the GTRK "Petersburg — Channel Five", except for frequencies in Saint Petersburg and the Leningrad Oblast. During the planning stages, the channel was intended to be named "Kultura" ("RTR-2"). This name and logo were briefly used in some printed TV guides, but the on-air logo from the start was a stylized letter "K".

The channel's staff largely consisted of off-screen employees from the disbanded "Lad" studio of Russian Television. Among them were director of musical programs Andrei Torstensen, chief editor of musical programs Valentin Ternyavsky, and head of artistic programs Ekaterina Andronikova. Some, like chief editor Arkady Bederov, had previously worked on the educational channel "Russian Universities," produced by VGTRK, whose airtime was transferred to NTV in 1996.

Initially, "Kultura" broadcast from 8:00 to 0:30 on weekdays and from 10:00 to 0:30 on weekends. In the Moscow region, weekday broadcasting was truncated, starting at 12:30. During its first year, "Kultura" shared its frequency in Moscow and the Moscow Oblast with the "Teleexpo" channel during morning and late-night hours, and from September 26, 1998, to October 2, 2001, with "MTV Russia". In Saint Petersburg, the channel did not broadcast initially due to the lack of an available frequency. Later, the channel's programs were temporarily retransmitted by the "OTV" company on channel 49 until "Kultura" acquired its own frequency on channel 29, which occurred on July 2, 2001.

On July 10, 1998, Tatyana Paukova was appointed chief editor of the channel by decree of the President of the Russian Federation.

In its early years, "Kultura" primarily aired content from the archives of the Gosteleradiofond, as well as select programs and documentaries previously shown on RTR and "Russian Universities". This was due to chronic underfunding of the channel and the limited production of cultural programming in the 1990s. The schedule also included short news segments from RTR's "Vesti," which were presented as "News" with their own hosts. As new projects were launched, the number of these segments decreased. A significant portion of the early programming was produced in Saint Petersburg, with the TPK "Petersburg" being the main contractor. Additional content was provided by VGTRK's own production units, such as "Rost" and "Arena," which also worked with RTR. From 1998 to 2002, the channel occasionally aired sports events that did not fit into RTR's schedule, including the 1998 and 2000 Olympic Games, the Euro 2000 match between Italy and Turkey, the 1999 World Championships in figure skating and skiing, the Russian Football Championship, the Volleyball World League, and the Kremlin Cup tennis tournament. All sports programming was removed from "Kultura" after the launch of the "Sport" channel in 2003.

From September 1 to 3, 2000, due to a fire at the Ostankino Tower, "Kultura" and NTV jointly broadcast to Moscow and the Moscow Oblast.

=== 2001–2006: Alexander Ponomarev ===
In June 2001, Alexander Ponomarev, former general director of TV-6, became the general director of the "Kultura" TV channel. He later headed a new subsidiary of VGTRK — GTRK "Kultura" (until July 2001, the entity responsible for the channel was the Federal State Unitary Enterprise "GTC 'Telekanal Kultura", and earlier, from 1997 to 1998, it was the "Main Editorial Office of the 'Kultura' TV Channel of VGTRK"). Simultaneously, a team of top managers who had previously worked with Ponomarev at TV-6 joined the channel: Deputy General Director Stella Neretina, Technical Director Alexander Zolotnitsky, Deputy General Director for Regional Network Development Elena Zlotnikova, Deputy General Director for Financial Affairs Andrei Voskresensky, and Deputy Head of Artistic Film Programming and Head of Special Projects Anna Lyubashevskaya. Under Ponomarev's leadership, the channel underwent significant changes: the quality of programming and inter-program design improved markedly, and by 2002, all departments of the channel had gradually moved to a new building on Malaya Nikitskaya Street. By September 24, 2001, the company "Teleatelie," founded by TV designer Semyon Levin after the dissolution of "NTV-Design," created a new visual identity for the "Kultura" channel. The new logo featured a capital letter "K" next to a floating tricolor.

Starting October 2, 2001, the "Kultura" channel partnered with the Russian-language version of "Euronews". Initially, "Euronews" broadcast only in the Moscow region, overlapping with some of "Kultura's" programming. From November 30, 2002, to September 3, 2017, "Euronews" was integrated into the "Kultura" broadcast schedule across all regions. Initially, its morning broadcasts ran from 6:30 to 12:30 on weekdays and from 6:30 to 10:00 on weekends. From September 30, 2002, it aired daily from 7:00 to 10:00, and from October 2, 2006, to September 3, 2017, it aired from 7:00 to 10:00 on Mondays and from 6:30 to 10:00 on other days. In the Moscow and Moscow Oblast version, in addition to the morning block, there was a nighttime block — initially from 0:30 to 3:00, but the start time shifted over time: from April 1, 2002, it ran from 1:00 to 3:00, from September 29, 2003, from 1:30 to 3:00, and from October 3, 2006, from 2:00 to 3:00 (except on Mondays).

On September 1, 2002, the channel's logo changed again: the word "Kultura" replaced the capital letter "K" next to the floating tricolor.

On September 30, 2002, coinciding with the launch of a new studio complex, the "Kultura" channel transitioned to zonal broadcasting. Program distribution was divided into four broadcast zones: "M" (Moscow time), "Double-3" (+2 hours), "Double-2" (+4 hours), and "Double-1" (+7 hours). At the same time, the channel began broadcasting at 10:00 in all regions without exception. After the expiration of the license for OJSC "MTK 'Teleexpo" on channel 33 in Moscow (which occurred on June 8, 2003), the "Kultura" channel launched a separate version for residents of Moscow and the Moscow Oblast. Despite this, in Moscow and the Moscow Oblast, the channel went on an official weekly technical break from 1:45 to 6:30 on Tuesday mornings. Starting in 2003, during quarterly maintenance work on the "Kultura" channel across Russia, the breaks occurred from Sunday to Monday night from 1:30 (later 2:00) to 7:00 (later 6:30 starting in 2017) and from Tuesday to Wednesday until 10:00. In the latter case, if such a technical break occurred, "Kultura" would start broadcasting immediately at 10:00 Moscow Time. From 2001 to 2003, during maintenance days, the main "Kultura" channel still broadcast, initially in an extended format until 15:30–16:00, and later until the start of regular programming at 10:00.

=== 2006–2009: Tatyana Paukova ===
After Alexander Ponomarev moved to the TVC channel in early 2006, Tatyana Paukova once again took the helm of "Kultura" as the channel's chief editor. By the end of that year, GTRK "Kultura" ceased to exist as an independent legal entity, becoming a branch of VGTRK, which Paukova also headed. Despite this, until July 2017, the copyright notice "GTRK 'Kultura'" continued to appear at the end of programs and documentaries produced either in-house or by third parties.

Throughout the broadcast period of the children's channel "Bibigon" (from September 1, 2007, to December 26, 2010), programs from this channel were aired during daytime slots in a dedicated block on "Kultura". Until January 1, 2010, the "Kultura" logo was adapted to resemble the "Bibigon" logo during these broadcasts.

On June 24, 2009, by decree of the President of Russia, the "Kultura" channel was included in the first multiplex of Russia's digital television as a mandatory channel for nationwide distribution.

Since November 19, 2009, Sergey Shumakov has served as the chief editor and director of the channel.

=== Since 2010: Sergey Shumakov ===
On January 1, 2010, the channel changed its logo to "Rossiya-K," styled to match the new branding of VGTRK. The full name of the channel became "Rossiya-Kultura." Starting in January 2011, the informational programs on "Kultura" began to be sponsored by VTB Bank, marking the first time in the channel's history that a contract was signed with a commercial organization.

After the federal law "On Protecting Children from Information..." came into force in September 2012, all programs aired on the channel (with very few exceptions) were broadcast without any age restrictions.

On the channel's 15th anniversary (November 1, 2012), a special episode of the program "Nablyudatel" was aired, lasting a record-breaking 9.5 hours.

From March 15, 2015, following a decision by VGTRK's leadership, the terrestrial broadcasting operator FGUP "Russian Television and Radio Broadcasting Network" (RTRS) gradually phased out analog broadcasting of the channel in a number of localities across 61 regions of Russia. Broadcasting continued only as part of the first multiplex (RTRS-1).

In June 2017, the channel underwent staff optimization: according to official data, 114 employees were laid off (out of approximately 700), while other sources reported that the staff was reduced by almost 40% (previously, it had been 800 people). The reasons for this included preparations for relocating to the Shabolovka Television Center, where "Kultura" had been partially housed until 2002], transitioning to high-definition (HD) broadcasting, and moving to a centralized signal distribution system under VGTRK.

In July 2017, due to financial and programming considerations, the long-running talk show "Kulturnaya Revolyutsiya," which had been airing since the early 2000s, was permanently canceled. This was done in favor of another talk show hosted by Mikhail Shvydkoy, titled "Agora," which launched in May 2017.

On July 19, 2017, the channel's logo underwent a partial change: the font of the word "Rossiya" on the blue rectangle was replaced, and the logo became opaque. Starting August 1, 2017, new episodes of the channel's programs, as well as the translation and dubbing of foreign documentaries and films, were produced directly under the order of VGTRK, with their intros mentioning the full name of the channel — "Rossiya-Kultura."

From September 4, 2017, the channel began broadcasting from 6:30 to 3:00 in all regions of Russia, including the version for Moscow and the Moscow Oblast. As a result, the "Euronews" block was completely removed from the broadcast on this frequency. Pyotr Fedorov, Director of the International Relations Directorate at VGTRK, explained the necessity of this decision by citing the outdated format of "a channel within a channel," the shift of the block's audience to watching the channel online or via gadgets, and requests from "Kultura's" chief editor, Sergey Shumakov. Other reasons included the claim that "Kultura," forced to share airtime with Euronews, was allegedly losing its audience. Additionally, starting from this date, the channel began its broadcasts with the Russian national anthem (previously, broadcasts started with a clock and the main intro).

In 2018, the channel transitioned to 16:9 format broadcasting. The transition occurred in two stages: from January 17, the "active picture" (the on-screen image) switched to this format, while actual broadcasting continued in 4:3 format until February 1. From April 24, 2019, video recordings of new episodes of the channel's programs were uploaded to its website in HD format. Starting March 27, 2020, the channel began broadcasting in high definition as part of the digital HD multiplex on channel 58 in Moscow and the Moscow Oblast.

From March 30 to June 23, 2020, due to the coronavirus situation, the channel adjusted its broadcast schedule following the closure of theaters, cinemas, and concert halls by presidential decree. The airing of almost all programs, including "Novosti Kultury," "Nablyudatel," "Glavnaya Rol," "Spokoynoy Nochi, Malyshi," "Agora," "Vlast Fakta," and several documentary projects, was gradually suspended. The slogan "Kultura Doma" (Culture at Home) was added below the channel's logo until June 2. In August–September, after informational programs returned to the schedule, the logo of their sponsor, VTB Bank, was removed from their intros.

In the fall of 2020, the channel canceled talk shows launched during Alexander Ponomarev's tenure: "Tem Vremenem. Smysly" and "Chto Delat?". The programs "Kult Kino," "Pyatoe Izmerenie," and "SAS. Te, s Kotorimi Ya..." ceased production following the deaths of their hosts, Kirill Razlogov, Irina Antonova, and Sergey Solovyov, respectively.

On November 1, 2020, a media platform named "Smotrim" was launched. It began hosting fresh videos of current programs and news segments from VGTRK's three main channels ("Rossiya-1," "Rossiya-Kultura," and "Rossiya-24"), with registration requiring an SMS code sent to a phone number. A month later, all existing videos, news, and program pages on the channel's website were also moved to this platform and merged with those of "Rossiya-1."

== Programming ==
The channel specializes in programs about Russian and world history, science, literature, music, fine and decorative arts, and architecture. The programs include classical music concerts, operas, ballets, and musical competitions. Among the channel's other programs are culture news, documentaries, lectures by leading domestic and foreign scholars, discussions on various aspects of social life. The channel often features interviews with artists, writers, scientists, politicians, and military figures.

== Logo history ==
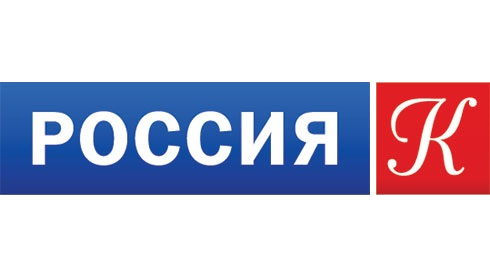
Russia-K's fifth logo only used in 2010

Russia-K's seventh logo used from 2017 to present-day. Initially used as a secondary logo between 2010-2017.
