= 2015 in Russia =

- Decades: 1990s; 2000s; 2010s; 2020s
- See also: History of Russia; Timeline of Russian history; List of years in Russia

The following lists some of the events from the year 2015 in Russia.

== Incumbents ==
- President of Russia: Vladimir Putin
- Prime Minister of Russia: Dmitry Medvedev

=== Governors ===
- Amur Oblast: Oleg Kozhemyako (until March 25, ER), Alexander Kozlov (starting March 25, ER)
- Arkhangelsk Oblast: Igor Orlov (ER)
- Astrakhan Oblast: Alexander Zhilkin (ER)
- Belgorod Oblast: Yevgeny Savchenko (ER)
- Bryansk Oblast: Alexander Bogomaz (ER)
- Chelyabinsk Oblast: Boris Dubrovsky (ER)
- Irkutsk Oblast: Sergey Yeroshenko (until October 2, ER), Sergey Levchenko (starting October 2, CPRF)
- Ivanovo Oblast: Pavel Konkov (ER)
- Kaliningrad Oblast: Nikolay Tsukanov (ER)
- Kaluga Oblast: Anatoly Artamonov (ER)
- Kemerovo Oblast: Aman Tuleyev (ER)
- Kirov Oblast: Nikita Belykh (Independent)
- Kostroma Oblast: Sergey Sitnikov (ER)
- Kurgan Oblast: Alexei Kokorin (ER)
- Kursk Oblast: Aleksandr Mikhailov (ER)
- Leningrad Oblast: Alexander Drozdenko (ER)
- Lipetsk Oblast: Oleg Korolyov (ER)
- Magadan Oblast: Vladimir Pechnyony (ER)
- Moscow Oblast: Andrey Vorobyov (ER)
- Murmansk Oblast: Marina Kovtun (ER)
- Nizhny Novgorod Oblast: Valery Shantsev (ER)
- Novgorod Oblast: Sergey Mitin (ER)
- Novosibirsk Oblast: Vladimir Gorodetsky (ER)
- Omsk Oblast: Viktor Nazarov (ER)
- Orenburg Oblast: Yury Berg (ER)
- Oryol Oblast: Vadim Potomsky (CPRF)
- Penza Oblast: Vasily Bochkarev (until May 25, ER), Ivan Belozertsev (starting May 25, ER)
- Pskov Oblast: Andrey Turchak (ER)
- Rostov Oblast: Vasily Golubev (ER)
- Ryazan Oblast: Oleg Kovalyov (ER)
- Sakhalin Oblast: Alexander Khoroshavin (until March 25, ER), Oleg Kozhemyako (starting March 25, ER)
- Samara Oblast: Nikolai Merkushkin (ER)
- Saratov Oblast: Valery Radaev (ER)
- Smolensk Oblast: Alexey Ostrovsky (LDPR)
- Tambov Oblast: Oleg Betin (until May 25, ER), Aleksandr Nikitin (starting May 25, ER)
- Tomsk Oblast: Sergey Zhvachkin (ER)
- Tula Oblast: Vladimir Gruzdev (ER)
- Tver Oblast: Andrey Shevelyov (ER)
- Tyumen Oblast: Vladimir Yakushev (ER)
- Ulyanovsk Oblast: Sergey Morozov (ER)
- Vladimir Oblast: Svetlana Orlova (ER)
- Volgograd Oblast: Andrey Bocharov (ER)
- Vologda Oblast: Oleg Kuvshinnikov (ER)
- Voronezh Oblast: Alexey Gordeyev (ER)
- Yaroslavl Oblast: Sergey Yastrebov (ER)
- Jewish Autonomous Oblast: Alexander Vinnikov (until February 24, ER), Alexander Levintal (starting February 24, ER)

== Events ==
=== January ===
- 1 January – Musa Zavgaev, known as Emir of the Nadterechny and Naursky Districts of Chechnya, and his accomplice, Bashir Omarov, were killed during a special operation in the outskirts of the village of Mekenskaya, Naursky District of Chechnya. Both of them had directly involved in organizing the 4 December assault on Grozny.
- 3 January – An image of a BPM-97 apparently inside Ukraine, in Luhansk, appeared to deliver further evidence of a Russian military presence there.
- 9 January – Russia bans transsexual and transgender individuals from obtaining driving licenses.
- 12 January – A controversial drama film, Leviathan, directed by Andrey Zvyagintsev wins the Best Foreign Language Film award at the 72nd Golden Globe Awards.
- 13 January
  - The Islamic State releases a video of a young boy gunning down two alleged Russian FSB agents captured by the militants.
  - War in Donbas:
    - A passenger bus has been shelled near Volnovakha south of the city of Donetsk, killing 12 and wounding 18 civilians. The Ukrainian authorities accused Russia and its backed separatists for the incident.
  - Mass protests in Armenia have taken place near the Russian consulate and the Russian 102nd Military Base after a Russian soldier brutally murdered a local family of seven, including a two-year-old and a 6-month-old.
- 15 January
  - Russian financial crisis:
    - One US dollar equals 66 Russian rubles. Moody's Investors Service has downgraded Russia's government bond rating to Baa3/Prime 3 (P-3) from Baa2/Prime 2 (P-2).

=== February ===
- 27 February – Russian politician Boris Nemtsov was shot and killed in the center of Moscow.

=== March ===
- 7 March – Russian authorities arrest two men, Anzor Gubashev and Zaur Dadayev, suspects from the rebellious North Caucasus region, according to Russian state media reports, relying on a statement from the Federal Security Service Director Alexander Bortnikov. However, Nemtsov's daughter, Zhanna Nemtsova, speaking from Germany, says she has no idea who they are. Many still suspect Russian governmental involvement in his death.
- 11 March – A fire in the shopping center Admiral in Kazan kills 17 people and injures 55.
- 15 March – The documentary film Crimea. The Way Home is released on Rossiya 1 and on YouTube.

=== April ===
- 2 April – The Russian-flagged fishing trawler Dalniy Vostok sinks off the Kamchatka Peninsula in the Sea of Okhotsk, killing 56 of its 132 crew. Sixty-three people have been rescued by other fishing vessels, while 12 are still missing.
- 4 April – Twenty-six workers of the Vostochny Cosmodrome have begun a hunger strike, joining over 100 laborers protesting delayed wage payments since 24 March.

=== May ===
- 9 May - Russia's 2015 Victory Day Parade was held on Red Square in Moscow, to celebrate the 70th anniversary of the defeat of Nazi Germany in the Great Patriotic War in 1945. Over 10,000 troops of the Russian Armed Forces and 1,300 troops from 10 foreign countries were also on parade, including contingents from nations in the Commonwealth of Independent States, as well as contingents from China, India, Serbia, and Mongolia participated in the parade.

=== June ===
- 15 June - The Russian Foreign Ministry issued a warning towards military presence at its western borders after the New York Times reported that the U.S. had offered to store milirary equipment in allied eastern European countries.
- 16 June - At a military and arms fair, President Vladimir Putin announced the addition of over 40 ballistic missiles to its nuclear arsenal that year that could overcome "even the most technically advanced anti-missile defense systems.”
- 23 June - President Vladimir Putin holds a meeting of the Council for Science and Education at the Kremlin.

=== November ===
- Russian Sukhoi Su-24 shootdown

=== Scheduled ===
- 2008-2015 Federal program is expected to end.

=== Sports ===
- 2015 World Aquatics Championships will take place from 24 July to 9 August.
- 2015 Bandy World Championship
- 2014–15 Russian Premier League
- 2014–15 Russian Bandy Super League

=== International sports competition ===
- Russia will participate in many international athletic competitions: 2015 Men's World Ice Hockey Championships, 2015 IIHF World Championship, 2015 European Figure Skating Championships, 2015 FIFA Women's World Cup qualification – UEFA Group 1, and 2015 Rugby World Cup.

== Deaths ==
=== January ===
- 1 January – Boris Morukov, 64, physician and cosmonaut, STS-106 mission specialist.
- 3 January – Olga Knyazeva, 60, fencer, Olympic champion (1976).
- 10 January – Denis Tsygurov, 43, ice hockey player (Buffalo Sabres, Los Angeles Kings).
- 12 January – Elena Obraztsova, 75, mezzo-soprano.
- 15 January – Rimma Markova, 89, actress.
- 17 January – Origa, 44, singer (Ghost in the Shell: Stand Alone Complex).
- 23 January – Alexander Lastin, 38, chess grandmaster.

=== February ===
- 1 February – Viktor Shekhovtsev, 74, footballer.
- 9 February
  - Valeri Poluyanov, 71, footballer.
  - Roman Sidorov, 59, footballer.
- 15 February – Mikhail Koulakov, 82, abstract painter.
- 16 February – Alexander Melentyev, 60, sport shooter, Olympic champion (1980).
- 21 February – Aleksei Gubarev, 83, cosmonaut.
- 23 February – Maria Golovnina, 34, journalist, Reuters bureau chief for Afghanistan and Pakistan.
- 27 February – Boris Nemtsov, 55, politician, First Deputy Prime Minister (1997–1998), Deputy Prime Minister (1998).

=== July ===
- 29 July – Liya Shakirova, 94, linguist and professor of pedagogical science.

== See also ==
- List of Russian films of 2015
- Russia at the 2015 European Games
