= Shekhovtsov =

Shekhovtsov (Russian: Шеховцов) is a Russian and Ukrainian surname.

- Anatoly Shekhovtsov (1930–2012), Ukrainian scientist in the area of internal combustion engines
- Anton Shekhovtsov (born 1978), Ukrainian academic
- Viktor Shekhovtsev (1940–2015), Soviet association football midfielder and Ukrainian coach.
- Volodymyr Shekhovtsov (born 1963), Ukrainian footballer and football manager
- Kirill Shekhovtsov (born 1998), Russian football player
