= Poluyanov =

Poluyanov (Russian: Полуя́нов; masculine) or Poluyanova (Russian: Полуя́нова; feminine) is a Russian last name shared by the following people:

- Grigory Poluyanov (1922—1945), Hero of the Soviet Union
- Natalia Poluyanova (born 1981), Russian politician
- Nikolay Poluyanov (born 1952), Russian politician
- Valeri Poluyanov (1943–2015), Soviet footballer
