= Smotrim =

Russian state multimedia online platform

- Website type: Multimedia online platform
- Available in: Russian
- Owner: VGRTK
- Website: smotrim.ru
- Commercial: Yes
- Registration: Required
- Launched: 1 November 2020

Smotrim (Russian: Смотрим) is a Russian state multimedia online platform developed by the largest state media holding All-Russia State Television and Radio Broadcasting Company (VGRTK). It began operating on November 1, 2020. The platform combines the content of all the holding's assets: federal channels Russia-1, Russia-24, Russia-K and the international channel RTR-Planeta, regional broadcasting of 79 branches throughout the country, radio stations Radio Rossii, Radio Mayak, Vesti FM, Kultura and Radio Yunost. The platform features news and reports, political talk shows, TV series, movies, podcasts, cartoons, humor, concerts, performances, documentaries, educational programs, entertainment shows, as well as live broadcasts of more than 20 Russian channels and radio stations. The platform has also an archive of programs produced by VGTRK for the Carousel TV channel in 2010–2023, and archive of programs from the Bibigon and Russia-2 TV channels, which were closed in 2010 and 2015, respectively.

== History ==
The smotrim.ru domain appeared back in 2006. The name "Smotrim" was first used by VGTRK in the spring of 2020, during the self-isolation regime due to the Coronavirus pandemic in Russia: from March 27 to June 9, the "Smotrim at home" plate was used on the website of the Russia-1 TV channel instead of its logo, from which the second word was then removed. In the summer of the same year, a license was obtained as an online publication.

In October 2020, it was announced that it would create its own media platform that would unite all VGRTK content.

This service will become an aggregator of all the company's content resources. SMOTRIM.RF will contain everything that can be seen or heard on the air of the media holding's channels: federal and regional news, analytical programs, films and series, premieres, exclusives. This is a media space for VGTRK content, where it is updated and found.

On November 1, 2020, VGRTK presented the Smotrim media platform — a website and an application for mobile devices. The company's executives spoke of a "revolutionary breakthrough", "convenience" and "reliability" for millions of users. At the official presentation, VGTRK Deputy General Director Anton Zlatopolsky said that they "worked very carefully and for a long time on the new digital platform, did tests, held focus groups". According to Denis Kuskov from TelecomDaily, the cost of developing and launching Smotrim should have amounted to tens of millions of rubles.

From December 2020 to January 2021, all existing videos, news and program pages on the websites of the Russia-1, Russia-K and closed Rossiya-2 TV channels, as well as in the My Planet application, were transferred to this platform. From March to May 2022, the same was done for the RTR-Planeta TV channel and all VGTRK radio stations.

On March 14, 2021, the Russia-1 channel announced that the number of service users had exceeded one million.

In March 2021, the platform began providing a selection of VGTRK documentaries, access to which was limited by the YouTube video hosting service. Among them are Crimea. The Way Home (author - Andrei Kondrashov), Beslan (author - Alexander Rogatkin), Rzhev. 500 Days in Fire, The Great Unknown War, The Munich Conspiracy. Invitation to Hell, Panfilov's Men. Legend and Fact, The Land of Aylan Kurdi, The Great Russian Revolution, The Warsaw Pact. Declassified Pages, Volyn-43. Genocide for the Glory of Ukraine", "Mussolini. Sunset" and others, to which YouTube applied sanctions.

In September 2022, the platform presented a selection of films from the Mosfilm studio.

== Functionality ==
The application makes it possible to read world news, as well as news from each region (watching regional Vesti and other programs from regional branches of VGTRK).

There is access to movies and TV series that have ever been broadcast on VGTRK, including exclusive content. There is a "Broadcast" section, which contains live broadcasts of a number of the main channels and radio stations of VGTRK. Due to the fact that VGTRK is one of the founders of the "Vitrina TV" service, broadcasts of some third-party channels are also available through the application.

In addition to the above, in the application you can watch live broadcasts of various (mainly political) live broadcasts.

Live broadcasts of TV channels are available regardless of the country of location: "RTR - Planeta" (all 4 takes are broadcast - Asia, CIS, Europe and the USA) and "Russia-24. World" (end-to-end global broadcasting).

Live broadcasts of TV channels are available only in Russia, depending on the user's location: "Russia-1" (all 10 takes are broadcast), Russia-24 (through broadcasting throughout Russia) and "Russia-Culture" (all 4 takes are broadcast), other channels, including their HD takes and radio stations. Also available is the broadcast of the TV channels "Russia-1" and "Russia-24" with inserts of all regional branches of VGTRK.

Full access to the platform is possible after registration, it is free.

== Availability ==
The platform is available in desktop versions on the smotrim.ru website, in applications for mobile devices based on the iOS and Android operating systems, as well as on Samsung and LG smart TVs.

In 2021, the Smotrim platform was included in the list of applications required to be pre-installed on smart TVs sold in Russia from April 1 of the same year.

On April 1, 2021, the media platform became available on Apple TV set-top boxes, as well as on TVs and media players based on Android TV, on Apple TV the application was a complete copy of the existing application of the Rossiya TV channel.
