= GTRK Kaliningrad =

Russian regional broadcaster

GTRK Kaliningrad (Russian: Государственная телевизионная и радиовещательная компания «Калининград», romanized: Gosudarstvennaya televizionnaya i radioveshchatelnaya kompaniya «Kaliningrad») is a VGTRK subsidiary covering Kaliningrad Oblast, a Russian exclave. Its facilities are located on the oblast capital Kaliningrad and is also in charge of Zapad 24, a regional news channel for western Russia.

== History ==
Radio broadcasts started in 1947, after Kaliningrad was put up under Soviet rule. Television broadcasts began on 25 June 1958, the first program seen being a concert featuring local residents. Since 1960, it became in charge of the coverage of television broadcasts of the DKBF parades in Baltiysk for the national network. Kaliningrad was given channel 12, but before broadcasts began, radio amateurs had set up a station on channel 4, which interfered with the Vilnius Television Center's transmitter.

In 1975, it started producing its output in color. In 1982, it started broadcasting its own channel, on VHF channel 6, which in 1984, was operational from 6pm to 9pm. The Kaliningrad Television Center also had airtime on Programme Two's frequencies in the oblast, with a 6pm-9pm schedule, though with different programming.

With the fall of the Soviet Union and the creation of the VGTRK, on 5 February 1992, the company was renamed GTRK Yantar (ГТРК Янтарь), broadcasting its programs on RTR's frequency. The former service on channel 6 was occupied by the Kaskad holding, which had the right to relay TNT on that channel and STS on UHF channel 34. From 1998 to 2004, it had a separate channel on UHF channel 27. In August 2004, Yantar broadcast its programs there in the early evening hours, with limited output on channel 6 and some on channel 12, coinciding with Russia's slots given to local programming, especially the local editions of Vesti. On weekends, some programs were relayed on channel 30 in the eastern side of the oblast.

On 24 November 2006, Yantar was renamed GTRK Kaliningrad. Beginning 2 March 2020, it started providing Zapad 24 (West 24), a regional news channel. On 31 March 2021, it was given obligation from the Russian government to broadcast on channel 22 on cable companies throughout the region.
