= All-Russia State Television and Radio Broadcasting Company =

Russian national state-owned broadcaster

- Trade name: Russian Television and Radio
- Native name: Всероссийская государственная телевизионная и радиовещательная компания
- Formerly: Russian State Television and Radio Broadcasting Company (RTR)
- Type: Unitary enterprise
- Industry: Mass media
- Founded: 14 July 1990; 36 years ago
- Headquarters: Moscow, Russia
- Key people: Oleg Dobrodeev
- Services: Television, radio, internet
- Revenue: $518 million (2017)
- Operating income: $363 million (2017)
- Net income: $45.9 million (2017)
- Total assets: $868 million (2017)
- Total equity: $29 million (2017)
- Owner: Federal Government of Russia
- Website: vgtrk.ru www.vgtrk.com

The All-Russia State Television and Radio Broadcasting Company (RTR), (Note: Russian: Федеральное государственное унитарное предприятие «Всероссийская государственная телевизионная и радиовещательная компания» (ВГТРК), romanized: Federal'noye gosudarstvennoye unitarnoye predpriyatiye «Vserossiyskaya gosudarstvennaya televizionnaya i radioveshchatel'naya kompaniya» (VGTRK)) also known as Russia Television and Radio, (Note: Russian: Россия. Телевидение и радио, romanized: Rossiya. Televideniye i radio) is a national state-owned broadcaster which operates a number of television and radio channels. The company, founded in 1990, is based in Moscow.

Nationwide TV and radio channels are broadcast from Moscow via regional transmitters of the Russian Television and Radio Broadcasting Network, the terrestrial transmitting network. TV and radio channels are also delivered to the regions via satellite. Regional programs are produced in regional production studios. RTR's holding company reported in December 2019 that it broadcast in 54 languages (including from local studios), up from 53 languages in 2010; this includes the moribund Nganasan language, spoken by less than 1,000 traditionally semi-nomadic people.

RTR has been accused of spreading propaganda and disinformation, inciting discord and hate during the Russo-Ukrainian war. Unlike RT, it is primarily produced for internal consumption. In 2015, its international television channel, RTR Planeta, was banned in Lithuania.

== History ==
The first Congress of People's Deputies adopted a 21 June 1990 resolution about RSFSR media, instructing the Council of Ministers to establish the Committee for Television and Radio Broadcasting of the RSFSR. On 14 July, a Presidium of the Supreme Soviet decree established the Russian State Television and Radio Broadcasting Company. Former Moscow News deputy editor Oleg Poptsov, was appointed its first chairman.

On 10 December of that year, Radio Rossii began broadcasting on a channel with the All Union First Programme of All-Union Radio, Radio Mayak and the Third All-Union Radio. RTR began broadcasting television to Russia on 13 May 1991 (after a postponement from March of that year) along with Programme Two. Soviet Central Television's Programme Two closed on 16 September, and RTR took over the remaining airtime. In April 1992, the Russian Universities TV channel began to replace Programme Four.

Russian Universities broadcast with the Ostankino 4th channel from 6 July 1992 to 16 January 1994, and after 17 January 1994 with NTV as part of RTR. In accordance with a February 1996 presidential decree by Boris Yeltsin, Oleg Poptsov stepped down as chairman and Eduard Sagalaev, then president and founder of the Moscow Independent Broadcasting Corporation (MIBC), was appointed in his place. On 11 November 1996, Russian Universities ceased broadcasting and its airtime passed to NTV. On July 19, 1996, its first satellite TV networks, Meteor-Sport and Meteor-Kino, were launched. On 1 November 1997, RTR began broadcasting the "Kultura" educational channel.

A presidential decree "On Improvement of Public Electronic Media" was drafted on 8 May 1998, based on information about RTR. Based on the decree, the Voice of Russia was created and Radio Mayak was reorganised. In 2001 RTR acquired a 1.8-percent stake in Euronews, which launched a Russian-language service later that year.

RTR began test broadcasts of the Kino-TV channel on 3 December 2012. It began test broadcasts of the high-definition TV channel Rossiya HD on 17 December, which began regular broadcasting on 29 December 2012. On 29 January 2013, at the Annual Exhibition and Forum of Television and Telecommunications (CSTB-2013), RTR announced the merger of eleven digital channels as "Digital TV". It includes documentary, sports, entertainment, and movie channels: History, Russian-HD, My Planet, Nauka 2.0, Sport, Sport-1-HD, The Fighting Club, Russian Roman, Russian Bestseller, Strana, and Sarafan. RTR began the Russian Detective channel (with domestic detective films and TV series) on 4 April 2014, and launched the international entertainment channel IQ HD eleven days later.

As a reaction to the 2022 Russian invasion of Ukraine, the European Union expressed plans for a ban of three of the largest Russian state-run broadcasters in early May of that year. The BBC reported that they were thought to include the RTR channels Rossiya and RTR Planeta. The EU had already banned RT and Sputnik, which broadcast in English, German, and Spanish. The Russian Ministry of Defense announced in June that the one million residents of the occupied southern Ukrainian Kherson region would receive RTR channels instead of Ukrainian television. On 8 July, the company was sanctioned by Canada.

In March 2022, YouTube blocked its RTR channel along with other Russian state media outlets. YouTube blocked several dozen other RTR channels in February 2024, including regional channels in Rostov-on-Don, Pskov, Vologda, and Murmansk.

== Operations ==
RTR owns and operates five national television stations, an international television network, twenty narrowcast digital television channels, five radio stations, over eighty regional broadcasters, and a multimedia online streaming platform. It joined the European Broadcasting Union in 1993. The EBU suspended RTR's membership on 1 March 2022 after the company announced its intention to withdraw from the union when the EBU excluded RTR from the Eurovision Song Contest as a consequence of Russia's invasion of Ukraine. The suspension was made indefinite at a meeting of the EBU executive board on 26 May of that year.

=== Television ===
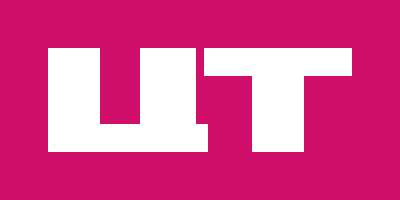
2016 Digital Television logo

- Russia-1 (Россия-1) — entertainment, news (formerly Russia, RTR-1, RTR and RTV)
- Russia-24 (Россия-24) — news channel (formerly Vesti)
- Russia-K (Россия-К) — cultural programming (formerly Culture, RTR-2)
- Carousel (Карусель) — children's and youth programming (jointly with Channel One Russia)

==== International channel ====
- RTR-Planeta (РТР-Планета)

==== Narrowcasting ====
- Moscow 24 (Москва 24) — News channel broadcasting in Moscow (formerly Stolitsa and TV Tsentr Stolitsa)
- 360° Moscow Region
- 20 channels as Digital Television

==== Former channels ====
- Bibigon (Бибигон) – a channel for children and adolescents, replaced by Carousel in 2010
- Russia-2 (Россия-2) — sports, entertainment, documentaries, movies, news; acquired by Gazprom-Media in 2015 and replaced by Match TV

=== Radio ===
- Radio Kultura (Радио Культура) – cultural radio, broadcast terrestrially on 91.6 FM in Moscow
- Radio Mayak (Радио Маяк) – general entertainment, current affairs, and adult contemporary music
- Radio Rossii (Радио России) – talk radio and regional programming
- Radio Yunost (Радио Юность) – Online only; formerly European and American pop music, now Soviet-era music
- Vesti FM (Вести FM) – news

=== Online ===
- Smotrim (Смотрим) – Multimedia online platform with content from all of VGTRK's assets

=== Regional ===
In addition to its Moscow operations, RTR includes 83 regional production studios and five territorial branches, providing coverage to every region in Russia. Regional production studios are located in the capital or administrative center of federal subjects, regardless of population. At a minimum, each produces regional newscasts during regional variation in the schedule of Russia-1. Many produce supplementary regional newscasts for insertion into Russia-24, regional news magazines and current-affairs programming for insertion into Russia-1 and Russia-24. Most also produce regional radio newscasts and cultural programming for insertion into Radio Rossyia and—less commonly—Radio Mayak, Vesti FM or both. Some have their own television channels and radio stations, broadcasting additional regional programming. Territorial branches produce their own television and radio newscasts (generally in lesser quantities than regional production studios) for broadcast to a smaller area. Each territorial branch is subordinate to a nearby regional production studio.

The names of regional production studios and territorial branches begin with GTRK, (Note: Russian: Государственная телевизионная и радиовещательная компания (ГТРК), romanized: Gosudarstvennaya televizionnaya i radioveshchatelnaya kompaniya (GTRK), lit. 'State television and radio broadcasting company') and are grouped by federal district in the table. Each territorial branch is grouped with its associated regional production studio.

Regional operations
Federal district	Regional production studio	City	Coverage area
Central	GTRK Belgorod	Belgorod	Belgorod Oblast
Central	GTRK Bryansk	Bryansk	Bryansk Oblast
Central	GTRK Ivtelradio	Ivanovo	Ivanovo Oblast
Central	GTRK Kaluga	Kaluga	Kaluga Oblast
Central	GTRK Kostroma	Kostroma	Kostroma Oblast
Central	GTRK Kursk	Kursk	Kursk Oblast
Central	GTRK Lipetsk	Lipetsk	Lipetsk Oblast
Central	GTRK Oka	Ryazan	Ryazan Oblast
Central	GTRK Oryol	Oryol	Oryol Oblast
Central	GTRK Smolensk	Smolensk	Smolensk Oblast
Central	GTRK Tambov	Tambov	Tambov Oblast
Central	GTRK Tula	Tula	Tula Oblast
Central	GTRK Tver	Tver	Tver Oblast
Central	GTRK Vladimir	Vladimir	Vladimir Oblast
Central	GTRK Voronezh	Voronezh	Voronezh Oblast
Central	GTRK Yaroslavia	Yaroslavl	Yaroslavl Oblast
Northwestern	GTRK Kaliningrad	Kaliningrad	Kaliningrad Oblast
Northwestern	GTRK Karelia	Petrozavodsk	Republic of Karelia
Northwestern	GTRK Komi Gor	Syktyvkar	Komi
Northwestern	GTRK Murman	Murmansk	Murmansk Oblast
Northwestern	GTRK Pomorie	Arkhangelsk	Arkhangelsk Oblast
Northwestern	GTRK Pomorie	Naryan-Mar (GTRK Zapolyarye) (Note: Territorial branch)	Nenets Autonomous Okrug
Northwestern	GTRK Pskov	Pskov	Pskov Oblast
Northwestern	GTRK Saint Petersburg	Saint Petersburg	Saint Petersburg
Northwestern	GTRK Saint Petersburg	Saint Petersburg	Leningrad Oblast
Northwestern	GTRK Slavia	Veliky Novgorod	Novgorod Oblast
Northwestern	GTRK Vologda	Vologda	Vologda Oblast
Southern	GTRK Adygea	Maykop	Adygea
Southern	GTRK Donetsk	Donetsk	Donetsk People's Republic (Note: Internationally recognized as part of Ukraine)
Southern	GTRK Don-TR	Rostov-on-Don	Rostov Oblast
Southern	GTRK Kalmykia	Elista	Kalmykia
Southern	GTRK Kuban	Krasnodar	Krasnodar Krai
Southern	GTRK Kuban	Sochi (GTRK Sochi)	Sochi
Southern	GTRK Lotos	Astrakhan	Astrakhan Oblast
Southern	GTRK Lugansk	Lugansk	Lugansk People's Republic
Southern	GTRK Sevastopol	Sevastopol	Sevastopol
Southern	GTRK Tavrida	Simferopol	Republic of Crimea
Southern	GTRK Volgograd-TRV	Volgograd	Volgograd Oblast
North Caucasian	GTRK Alania	Vladikavkaz	North Ossetia–Alania
North Caucasian	GTRK Dagestan	Makhachkala	Dagestan
North Caucasian	GTRK Ingushetia	Nazran	Ingushetia
North Caucasian	GTRK Kabardino-Balkaria	Nalchik	Kabardino-Balkaria
North Caucasian	GTRK Karachay-Cherkessia	Cherkessk	Karachay-Cherkessia
North Caucasian	GTRK Stavropol	Stavropol	Stavropol Krai
North Caucasian	GTRK Vainakh	Grozny	Chechnya
Volga	GTRK Bashkortostan	Ufa	Bashkortostan
Volga	GTRK Chuvashia	Cheboksary	Chuvashia
Volga	GTRK Mari El	Yoshkar-Ola	Mari El
Volga	GTRK Mordovia	Saransk	Mordovia
Volga	GTRK Nizhny Novgorod	Nizhny Novgorod	Nizhny Novgorod Oblast
Volga	GTRK Orenburg	Orenburg	Orenburg Oblast
Volga	GTRK Penza	Penza	Penza Oblast
Volga	GTRK Perm	Perm	Perm Krai
Volga	GTRK Samara	Samara	Samara Oblast
Volga	GTRK Saratov	Saratov	Saratov Oblast
Volga	GTRK Tatarstan	Kazan	Tatarstan
Volga	GTRK Udmurtia	Izhevsk	Udmurtia
Volga	GTRK Volga	Ulyanovsk	Ulyanovsk Oblast
Volga	GTRK Vyatka	Kirov	Kirov Oblast
Ural	GTRK Kurgan	Kurgan	Kurgan Oblast
Ural	GTRK South Ural	Chelyabinsk	Chelyabinsk Oblast
Ural	GTRK Tyumen-Region	Tyumen	Tyumen Oblast
Ural	GTRK Ural	Yekaterinburg	Sverdlovsk Oblast
Ural	GTRK Yamal	Salekhard	Yamalo-Nenets Autonomous Okrug
Ural	GTRK Yugoria	Khanty-Mansiysk	Khanty-Mansi Autonomous Okrug
Siberian	GTRK Altai	Barnaul	Altai Krai
Siberian	GTRK Gorny Altai	Gorno-Altaysk	Altai Republic
Siberian	GTRK Irkutsk	Irkutsk	Irkutsk Oblast
Siberian	GTRK Irkutsk	Ust-Ordynsky (GTRK Ust-Orda)	Ust-Orda Buryat Okrug
Siberian	GTRK Irtysh	Omsk	Omsk Oblast
Siberian	GTRK Khakassia	Abakan	Khakassia
Siberian	GTRK Krasnoyarsk	Krasnoyarsk	Krasnoyarsk Krai
Siberian	GTRK Krasnoyarsk	Dudinka (GTRK Taymyr)	Taymyrsky Dolgano-Nenetsky District
Siberian	GTRK Kuzbass	Kemerovo	Kemerovo Oblast
Siberian	GTRK Novosibirsk	Novosibirsk	Novosibirsk Oblast
Siberian	GTRK Tomsk	Tomsk	Tomsk Oblast
Siberian	GTRK Tuva	Kyzyl	Tuva
Far Eastern	GTRK Amur	Blagoveshchensk	Amur Oblast
Far Eastern	GTRK Bira	Birobidzhan	Jewish Autonomous Oblast
Far Eastern	GTRK Buryatia	Ulan-Ude	Buryatia
Far Eastern	GTRK Chita	Chita	Zabaykalsky Krai
Far Eastern	GTRK Chita	Aginskoye (GTRK Aginskoye)	Agin-Buryat Okrug
Far Eastern	GTRK Chukotka	Anadyr	Chukotka Autonomous Okrug
Far Eastern	GTRK Far East	Khabarovsk	Khabarovsk Krai
Far Eastern	GTRK Kamchatka	Petropavlovsk-Kamchatsky	Kamchatka Krai
Far Eastern	GTRK Magadan	Magadan	Magadan Oblast
Far Eastern	GTRK Sakha	Yakutsk	Sakha
Far Eastern	GTRK Sakhalin	Yuzhno-Sakhalinsk	Sakhalin Oblast
Far Eastern	GTRK Vladivostok	Vladivostok	Primorsky Krai
