= GTRK Donetsk =

GTRK Donetsk (Государственная телевизионная и радиовещательная компания «Донецк») is a VGTRK subsidiary covering the Donetsk People's Republic, a Russian breakaway republic which consists of Russian-captured areas of Ukraine's Donetsk oblast. It was created after the annexation of parts of four Ukrainian oblasts in 2022, which is contested under international law.

== History ==
The DPR already had its media outlets upon establishment, chief among them being Oplot TV. In the wake of an annexation of four captured oblasts, VGTRK announced its creation.

On 4 September 2023, British intelligence reported that Russian state media group VGTRK set up stations in the Ukrainian territories Russia annexed, including the DPR. Local news is delivered in the local editions of Vesti, Russia-1's news service, but giving a one-sided, pro-Russian account of the news. According to VGTRK, it took them more than one year to prepare its launch; the delay was due to the constant reection of trained expertise. Ukrainian news and its viewpoint are only accessible via VPNs. Since its establishment, its director is Andrey Vladimirovich Rudenko, who supported the Russian invasion of Ukraine, commissioning "staged" stories to air on the national news service. On 31 December 2024, he took part on that year's edition of Little Blue Light.
