= Oleg Dobrodeev =

Russian journalist and media manager (born 1959)

Oleg Borisovich Dobrodeev
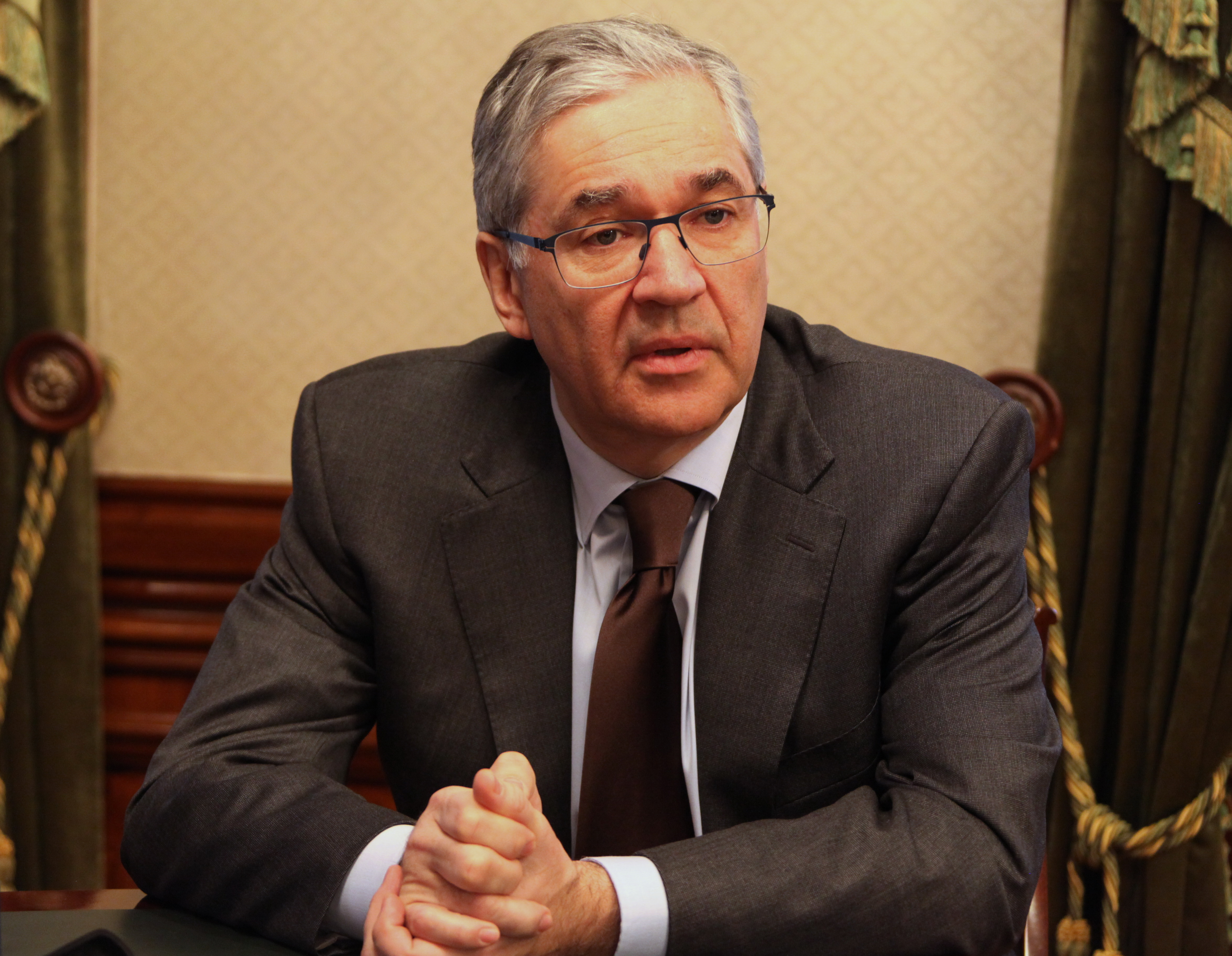
- Dobrodeev in 2019
- Born: Oleg Borisovich Dobrodeev; 28 October 1959 (age 66); Moscow, Russian SFSR, Soviet Union
- Education: Moscow State University
- Organization(s): 1st General Director of VGTRK (2004–n); Chairman of the All-Russian State Television and Radio Company (2000–04); 2nd Director of NTV (1997-2000).
- Awards: Order of Merit for the Fatherland (2019), Certificate of Honor of the President of the Russian Federation 2009, Order of Kadyrov (2008)

Oleg Borisovich Dobrodeev (born 28 October 1959) is a Russian journalist and media manager, general director of the All-Russian State Television and Radio Broadcasting Company (VGTRK).

Due to the Russian invasion of Ukraine, as a propagandist, he is included in the sanctions lists of all EU countries, the United Kingdom and a number of other countries.

== Personal life ==
Oleg Borisovich Dobrodeev was born 28 October 1959, in Moscow. The Son of screenwriter Boris Tikhonovich Dobrodeev (1927–2022). A scriptwriter and Film Makers Union secretary, Oleg's father produced documentaries on Karl Marx and the family grew up in a community of writers North of Moscow. Dobrodeev Jr. also has an older brother, Dmitry Dobrodeev (born 1950), a writer, who lives in the Czech Republic.

In 1981 Dobrodeev graduated from the Faculty of History of Moscow State University (MGU) with a degree in Modern and Contemporary History of France. After graduation, he became a researcher at the Institute for the US and Canada of the USSR Academy of Sciences. In 1982 he studied at the graduate school of the Institute of the International Labor Movement.

Oleg Borisovich Dobrodeev is married and has one Son, Boris (born 1984), who worked as CEO of Mail.ru Group.

== Television career ==
Oleg Borisovich Dobrodeev began his career in television in 1983 as an employee of the Central Television of the USSR State Radio and Television (TsT). He began his work here as a junior editor, then was a correspondent, commentator on the Vremya program and deputy editor-in-chief of the Main Editorial Information.

For a short time Dobrodeev led the program 120 minutes. In 1990 he created weekly program of the Central Television Seven days. From 1990 to September 1991, he was the director of the news program Vesti.

From September 1991 to September 1993 Oleg Borisovich Dobrodeev was chief editor of the Information Television Agency of the State Television and Radio Company "Ostankino". On 5 January 1992, ten days after the fall of the Soviet Union Dobdrodeev launched the show Itogi in the Vremya time slot.

Oleg Borisovich Dobrodeev founded of the commercial television company NTV with Evgeny Kiselev and Vladimir Gusinky. Since September 1993, he has been the editor-in-chief of the Information Program Service of the NTV television company. From 1993 to 1997 - Vice President of the NTV television company. Since July 1996 - one of the founders of NTV-Plus CJSC . Since January 1997 - one of the founders of CJSC " Media-Most ". From December 1997 to January 2000 - General Director of NTV Television Company. Since 13 April 2000, he has also been the editor-in-chief of the United Editorial Office of Electronic Media of the Rossiya Channel and the Vesti State Television Company.

Dobrodeev also founded the state news channel Russia-24 owned by VGTRK which has a stated goal to broadcast stories of Russian life beyond the borders and has broadcast since 2006. The channel is banned in the European Union,Ukraine,Kyrgyzstan, Moldova, United Kingdom, Turkmenistan.

On 23 July 2018, Oleg Borisovich Dobrodeev oversaw at the opening of the VGTRK branch in the occupied Crimea. He noted, "And this is really the main element in this information chain,” to talk “, about the final informational return of Crimea to the Homeland".

== Sanctions ==
Following Russia's invasion of Ukraine, the European Union imposed sanctions on Dobrodeev "for actively supporting or implementing actions or policies that undermine or threaten the territorial integrity, sovereignty and independence of Ukraine" in April 2022

The European Union notes that "Oleg Dobrodeev actively participated in the Kremlin's propaganda, creating and disseminating distorted information in the interests of the political leadership of the Russian Federation." In addition, Oleg Dobrodeev is the initiator and main creator of the state-owned TV channel "Russia-24", the owner of the TV channel "Russia-1".

On 4 May 2022, the United Kingdom sanctioned Dobrodeeev as a person "associated with a person involved in obtaining benefits from the Government of Russia.”

Canada sanctioned Dobrodeev on 7 July 2022, as a Russian figure of disinformation and propaganda, as well as Switzerland and New Zealand.

Ukraine sanctioned Dobrodeev in July 2022 for a period of 10 years.

== Gallery ==
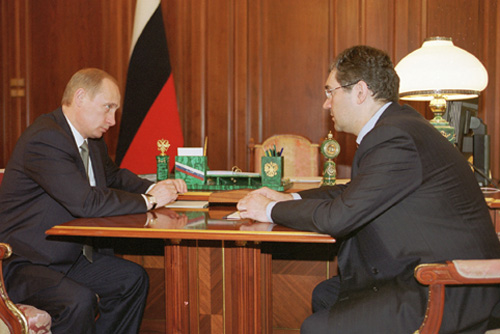
With Vladimir Putin from NTV affair (16 April 2001)

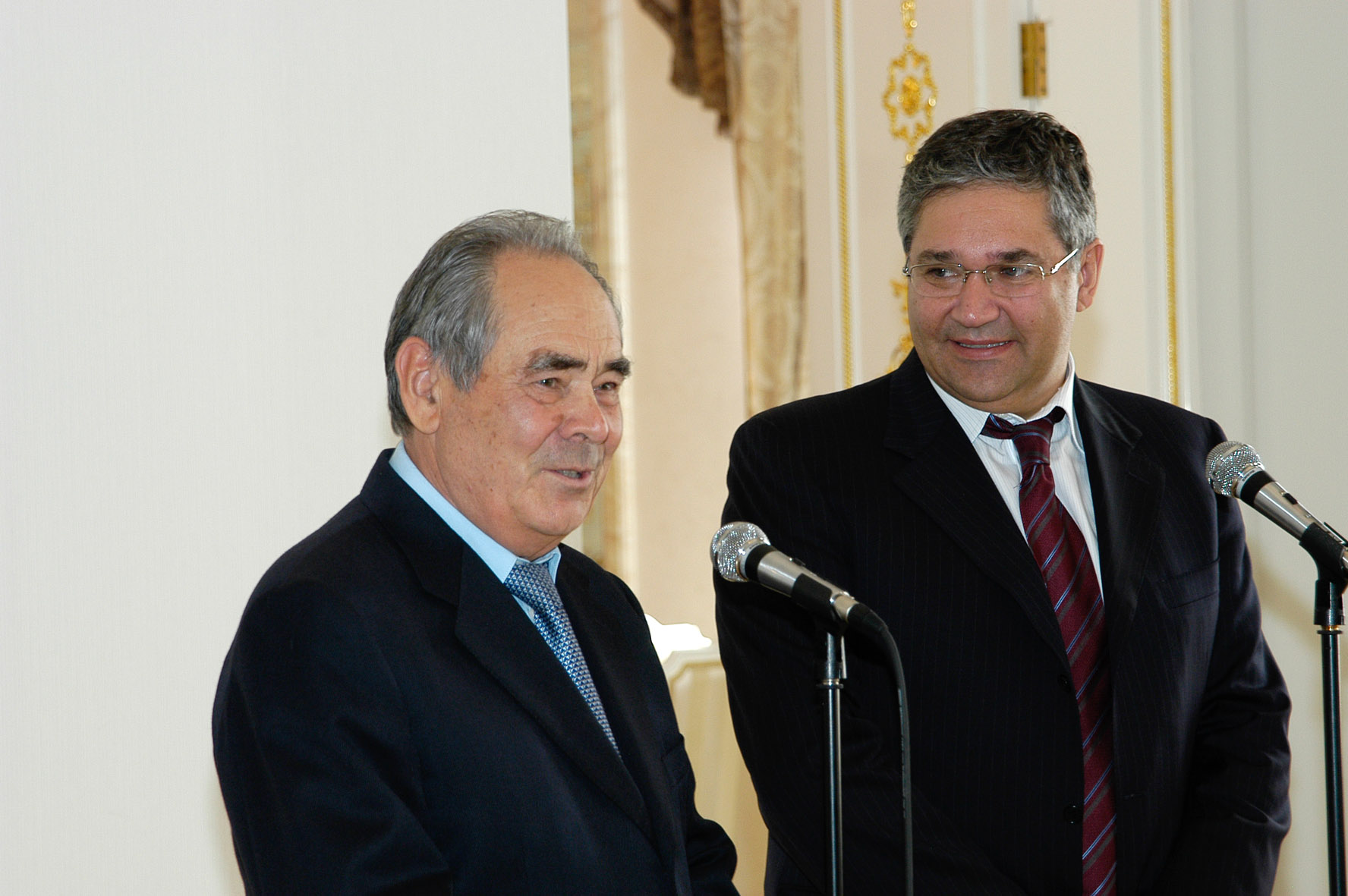
With Mintimer Shaimiev (5 September 2005)

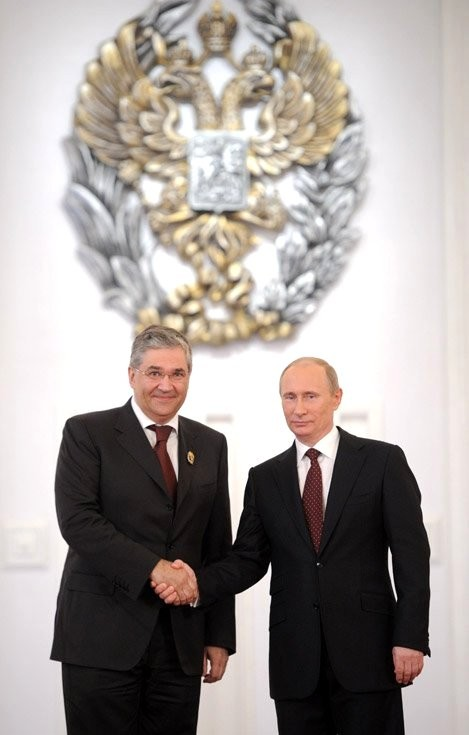
Presentation of the State Prize of the Russian Federation (12 June 2012)

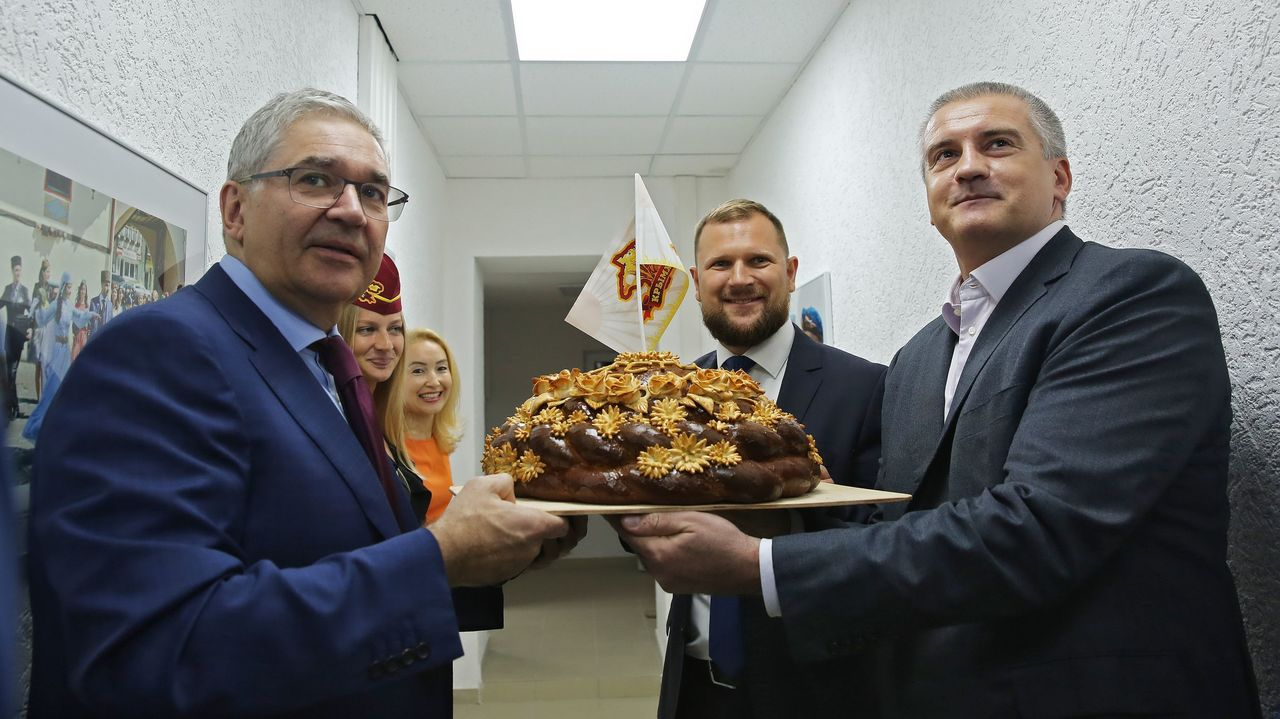
With Sergei Aksyonov (22 July 2018)

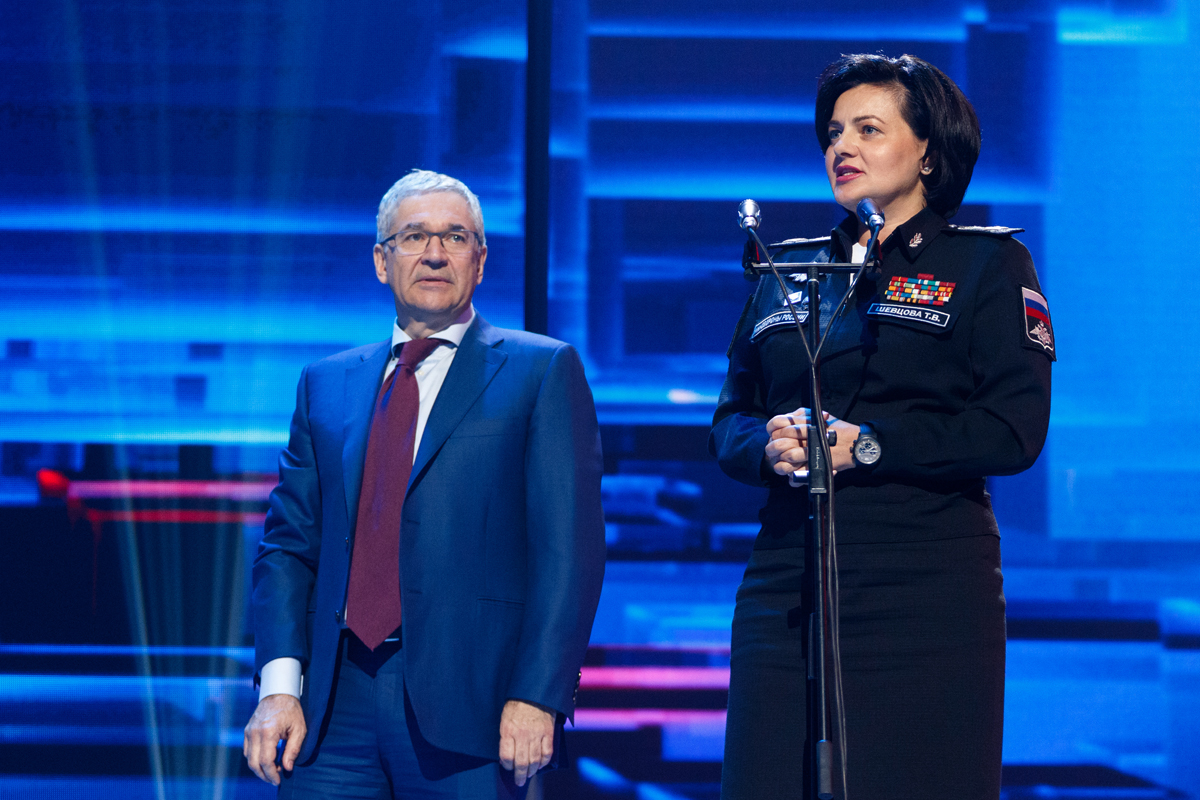
With Deputy Minister of Defence Tatiana Shevtsova on Media-AS 2019 (23 May 2019)

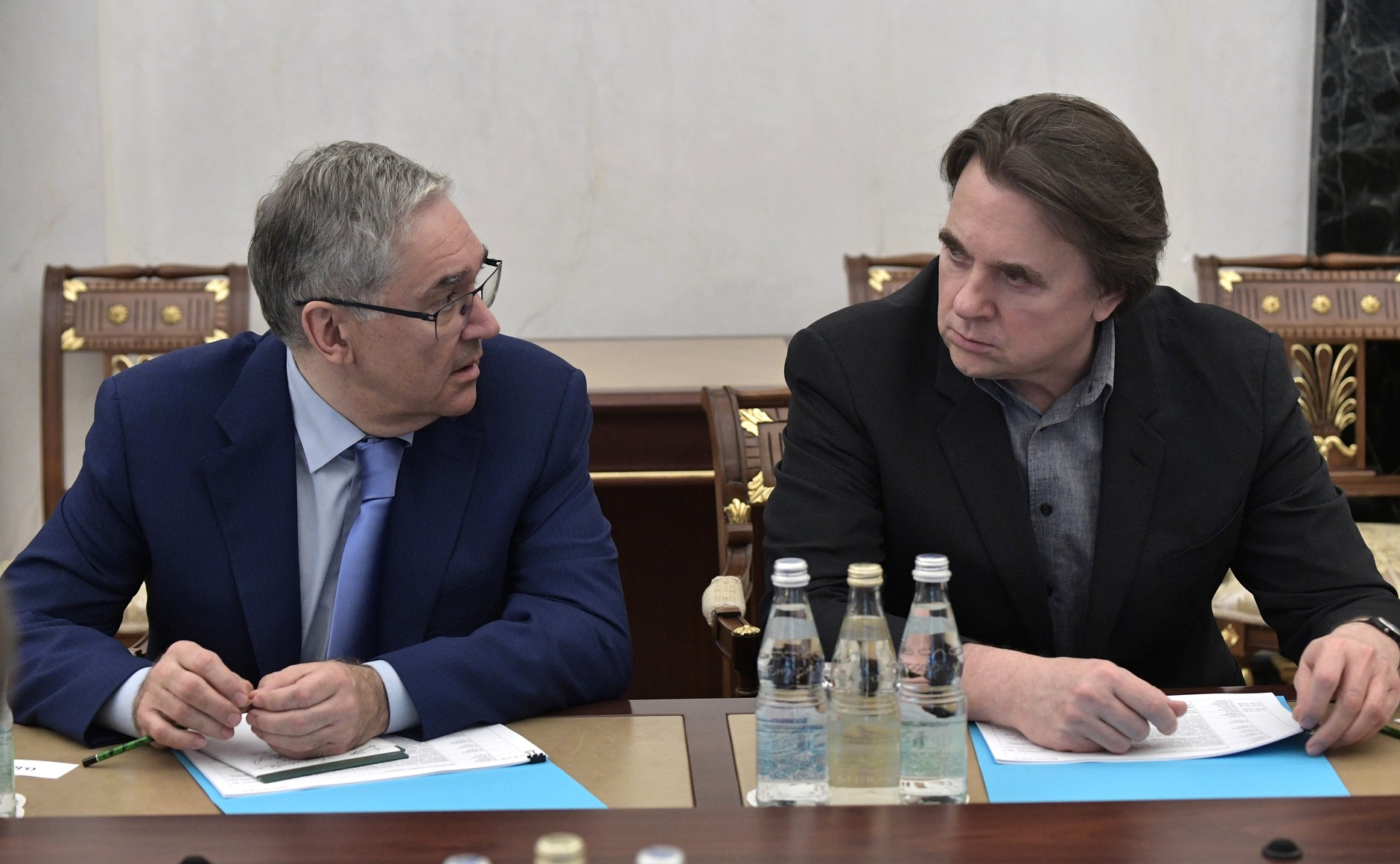
With Konstantin Ernst (19 June 2019)

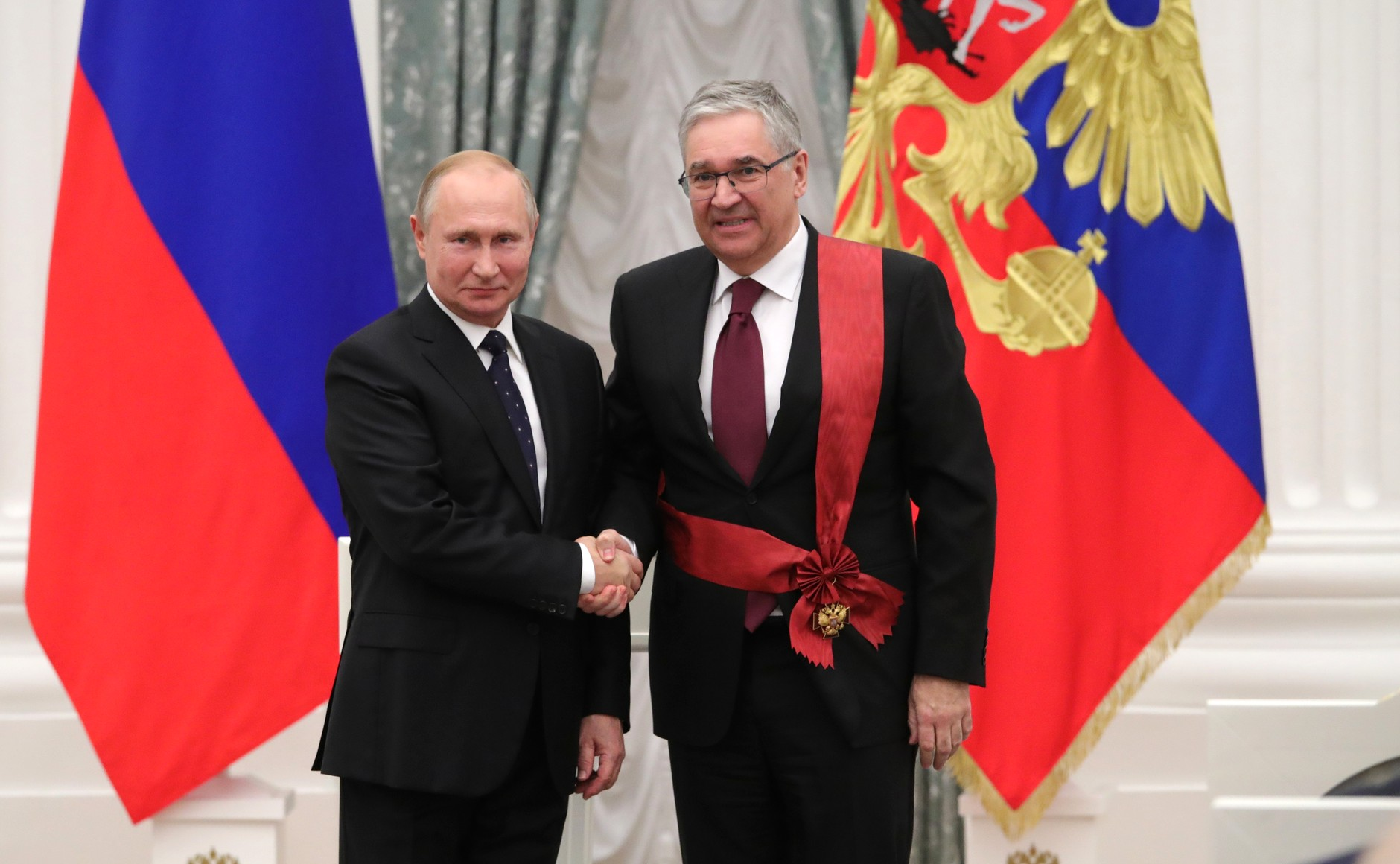
Presentation of the Order "For Merit to the Fatherland", 1st class (21 November 2019)
