= GTRK Chukotka =

GTRK Chukotka (Государственная телевизионная и радиовещательная компания «Чукотка») is a VGTRK subsidiary covering the Chukotka Autonomous Okrug. Its facilities are located in Anadyr and produces programs in Russian and Chukchi languages.

== History ==
The first radio broadcast in Chukotka took place on 22 December 1935, coinciding with the fifth anniversary of the establishment of the Chukotka National Okrug, bringing Soviet Central Radio to the region; local news bulletins began in the late 1930s. By 1960, local radio programs were broadcast 2 1/2 hours a day, while also beginning programs in Chukchi. In 1967, programs for the Chukchi language family started, with the aim of targeting the native population not only in Chukotka, but also in Alaska. The program was initially presented by Zoya Nenlyumkina, being replaced with Nina Emmynkau in 1976. New radio premises were erected in 1979.

On 31 October 1967, television broadcasts began in Anadyr, days ahead of the establishment of the Ostankino Tower. Viewers saw a filmed feature about the masters of Soviet circus. At the time, only two television sets were installed in town. The first Chukchi face to appear on television was Nadezhda Kuchina. As of 2009, she was the only Chukchi journalist on local television, responsible for the translation of the items for the Chukchi news service.

With the dissolution of the USSR and the creation of VGTRK, Radio Chukotka and the Anadyr Television Studio merged to form the Chukotka Radio and Television Broadcasting Company. On 16 May 1995, the company got a six-year license to operate a second television channel, Chukotka, on VHF channel 9 in Anadyr. The station later affiliated with STS until 2004, which as of January 2003, had two daily inserts (late morning and prime time) for local programming, including repeats of Vesti Chukotka.

On 3 November 2017, its television unit held a 50th anniversary event at the Polarny cinema, which included video features on how the local news service was made, as well as interviews with current and former staff. In January 2020, it was the last VGTRK unit to upgrade its equipment, following a plan initiated in 2009. This enabled the broadcaster to begin producing and relaying programs in high definition and 4K. The last time GTRK Chukotka had upgraded was in 2005. Before the conversion, the local edition of Vesti was criticized for its lack of image quality.

== Programming ==
The television station produces Vesti Chukotka. In early 2020, the station gained an extra hour of programming on weekend mornings, which was seen as "unpractical". It was believed that the increase in airtime was due to the shutdown of STS affiliate Belyy Veter (White Wind). Invitee in the Studio, which aired on the former STS affiliate until the end of 2019, moved to Russia-1 Chukotka as a result. It aired after the 8am repeat of the Friday evening news bulletin.

Television broadcasts are shared with GTRK Kamchatka, as both regions use the same Russia-1 feed. However, Kamchatka receives more regional programming because it has a larger population. Following a technological upgrade in the early weeks of 2020, viewers in nine villages lost access to Vesti Chukotka on Russia-1 for local news and instead had to rely on Russia-24, which is carried on the second multiplex.

Television programming in Chukchi language is limited. In January 2003, GTRK Chukotka aired Эйгыскʼын on Thursdays on the late afternoon opt-out slot on RTR. By the late 2000s, a news bulletin in Chukchi premiered, Пынʼылтэ. It is a mere translation of the previous evening's Russian bulletin, initially running for twenty minutes. In 2009, it was mainly viewed in Anadyr, where the ethnic Chukchi population is low. Пынʼылтэ was even joked by people, saying it was for the elderly, due to its mid-afternoon timeslot (15:20). As of April 2025, it runs for twenty-five minutes in a morning timeslot (09:30), while on Fridays, it is repeated at 11:30 and 21:10, where, on other days, the Russian local edition is broadcast.
