= Gyumri massacre =

2015 mass murder in Gyumri, Armenia

Coordinates: 40.7833°N 43.8333°E

- Location of Shirak Province in Armenia
- Location: Gyumri, Shirak Province, Armenia
- Date: January 12, 2015; 6:10 – 6:30
- Attack type: Mass murder, mass shooting, killing spree
- Weapons: AK-74, knife bayonet
- Deaths: 7
- Perpetrator: Valery Permyakov
- Convictions: Life imprisonment
- Convicted: Murder

The Gyumri massacre was a mass murder of seven members of the Armenian Avetisyan family in Gyumri, Armenia, on January 12, 2015. The suspect, Valery Permyakov, a Russian serviceman from the Russian 102nd Military Base, was apprehended by the Armenia-based Russian Border Guards near the border with Turkey and brought into custody at the Gyumri base for further investigation under the Russian jurisdiction. Spontaneous demonstrations in Gyumri and Yerevan ensued, demanding that Permyakov be tried and serve his sentence in Armenia. Perceived inadequate government response further triggered public outrage in Armenia in early 2015 following the incident. In August 2016, Permyakov was sentenced to life on charges of murder by an Armenian court; the court's ruling was upheld in December 2016 by the Appeals Court in Yerevan.

== Background ==
Several incidents have occurred in Gyumri involving the Russian military base. In 1999, two drunken soldiers, Denis Popov and Alexander Kamenev, armed with AK-74 assault rifles, killed two men, Vaghinak Simonyan and David Soghomonyan, and injured 14. The two men were tried in Armenia. Popov was sentenced to 14 years in prison and Kamenev to 15. Whether or not the two served their entire terms in Armenia is unclear and little is known about this court's investigation and punishment. In an interview published on January 16 with News.am, Popov's lawyer, Tamara Yailoyan, claimed that her former client had been transferred to Russia "after two to three years," and, "we later learned, set free." In 2013, two children were killed by a mine on the training field in the vicinity of the military base. The field was not fenced or given proper warning, but nonetheless the command of the military base never punished anyone and also ignored the official complaints of the locals.

== Murder ==
On January 12, 2015, six people were found dead in Gyumri, Armenia. The Armenian Investigative Committee named Valery Permyakov, a Russian servicemen stationed at the Russian 102nd Military Base in Gyumri, as a suspect. Permyakov reportedly deserted the base. He left a gun and his military uniform at the scene of the crime.

The six victims were identified on the same day. They include a couple, their son and daughter-in-law, a 2-year-old granddaughter, and an unmarried daughter. The victims were:

- Seryozha Karapeti Avetisyan (born 1961, father)
- Hasmik Rafiki Avetisyan (born 1959, mother)
- Aida Seryozhahi Avetisyan (born 1979, daughter)
- Armen Seryozhahi Avetisyan (born 1981, son)
- Araks Avetisyan (born 1990, Armen's wife)
- Hasmik Armeni Avetisyan (born 2012, Araks and Armen's daughter).
- Seryozha Armeni Avetisyan (Araks and Armen's 6-month-old son) survived the attack and was taken to a local hospital in critical condition. The infant died of wounds on January 19 in a Yerevan hospital.

== Perpetrator ==
The murderer is Valery Pavlovich Permyakov (Russian: Валерий Павлович Пермяков), a soldier of the Russian 102nd Military Base. His parents – Pavel Gennadievich and Maria Kuzminichna are Christians of Evangelical Faith. His father repairs refrigerators and is a pastor of "Evangelical Christians in Zabaykalsky Krai". Permyakov has an older brother and four sisters (three of them are from the first marriage of his father), his brother was convicted of murder or attempted murder. The family has relatives in the United States.

Permyakov had completed nine years of high school in the town of Baley in Zabaykalsky Krai. On 20 May 2014 he was drafted from Baley. On 3 December he was transferred from Chita to Gyumri, and served in a tank battalion. According to his colleagues, he gave the impression of a normal person and had no problems with the service.

== Protests and official response ==
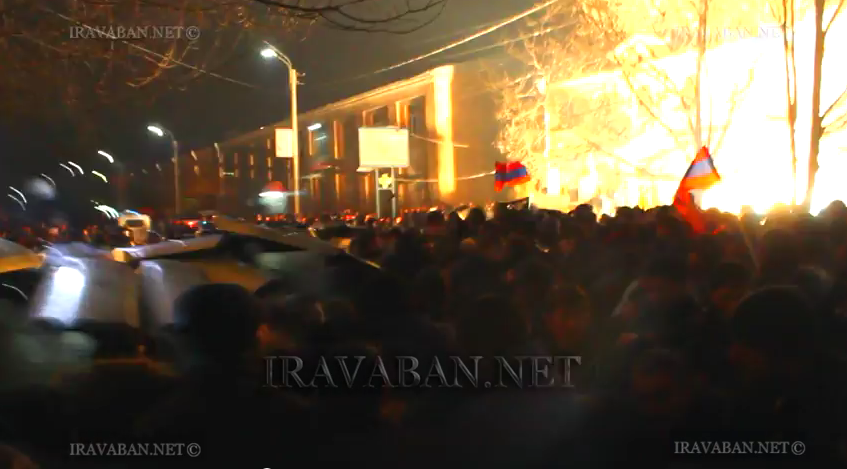
Clashes between protesters and police near the Russian consulate in Gyumri, January 15

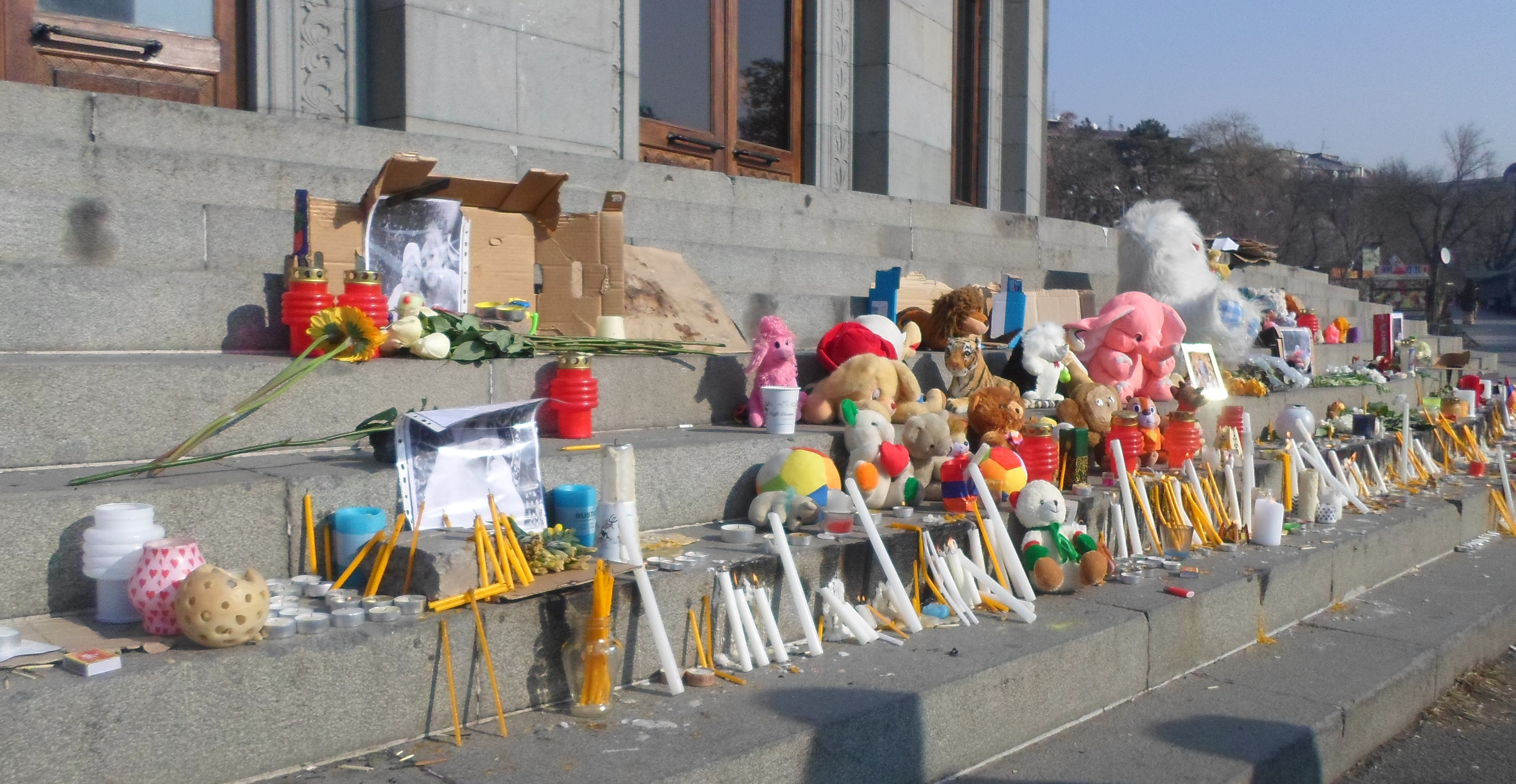
Candles, flowers, and toys on the stairs of the Yerevan Opera House on January 20, 2015, after the death of six-month-old Seryozha.

On January 13, 2015, protest took place at the Russian embassy in Yerevan. Protesters demanded the removal of the Russian military base from the territory of Armenia and the expulsion of the Russian ambassador. Residents of Gyumri also held a spontaneous rally in the city's central square, calling attention to the massacre. On January 13 a rally was held in Gyumri by hundreds of citizens demanding the case be handled by Armenian law-enforcement agencies.

On January 14 a car rally was held in Gyumri demanding the transfer of Permyakov to the Armenian law enforcement agencies. Around two thousand people marched to the territory of Russian military base with the same demand, but the police blocked the road leading to the facility.

On January 15 the funeral of the Avetisyan family took place in Gyumri. Thousands of people from Gyumri, Yerevan and other Armenian cities came to bid farewell to the victims of the massacre. Mass protests took place both in Yerevan and Gyumri all day long. Police and protesters clashed near the Russian consulate in Gyumri. At least 14 people were injured during the clashes in Gyumri. A number of activists were detained during the protest near the Russian embassy in Yerevan, among them director Tigran Khzmalyan. Dozens of protesters tried to burn the Russian flag. At least 38 people were detained from Yerevan's Freedom Square. They were freed the next day. According to Armen Grigoryan, "In part, mass frustration and disappointment has grown because the Armenian president and prime minister have not made any public statements to address the case."

Armenia's Prosecutor-General Gevorg Kostanyan promised to make an official request to Russian authorities to transfer Permyakov to the Armenian law enforcement agencies.

On January 19 dozens of people put candles, flowers and toys on the stairs of the Yerevan Opera House in the memory of the six-month-old Seryozha. In Gyumri, people gathered before the house of the Avetisyan family and left candles there. The infant was buried on January 21 in Gyumri. His funeral service at Gyumri's Surb Nshan Church was attended by hundreds.

== Arrest and investigation ==
Police began a manhunt and called on citizens to inform about the possible whereabouts of the suspect. Permyakov was detained some 16 km away from Gyumri, near the village of Bayandur, near the Turkish border by Russian border guards.

The office of Armenia's Prosecutor-General stated on the first days that the case was under the jurisdiction of Russian authorities. The legality of this action was widely questioned and caused controversy in Armenia.

Permyakov was, upon arrest, kept in custody at the Russian base, where the case has been under investigation since by the Russian military authorities.

Permyakov confessed to the crime on the first day in detention. He claimed he entered the family's home because he wanted something to drink.

On February 3 the Armenian Prosecutor-General Gevorg Kostanyan formally asked his Russian counterpart to hand over Permyakov. On the same day, Kommersant reported that the two sides agreed to try the soldier in a Russian military court at the 102nd base.

On February 5 the Russian media outlets cited military officials as saying that Permyakov has intellectual disability and should not have been drafted in the first place.

== Media coverage ==
Although media in Armenia covered the case extensively, the state run TV in Armenia initially "avoid[ed] information about the investigation and the protest campaign."

Russian media was largely silent about the massacre initially, with none of the three major Russian-wide channels, Russia-1, First Channel, and NTV, providing any coverage within the first day. On the second day, NTV reported only that a soldier fled the Russian military base in Gyumri and had been found, leaving out any mention of the murders. Another major TV station Russia-24, likewise reported a day late, and had emphasized that Permyakov was "excellent" in his military service.

Following the death of 6-month-old Seryozha, Russian journalist Vladimir Solovyov called for a public execution of Permyakov.

== Impact ==
Thomas de Waal wrote that the protests "show that the Armenian public has a much broader spectrum of views than do their political leaders. The political fallout of the horrible Gyumri massacre will not result in a strategic orientation away from Russia. But it will further hollow out public support for President Sargsyan and his government."

=== Anti-Russian sentiment ===
The massacre caused a wave of anti-Russian sentiment among some Armenians, especially in Gyumri. According to Armen Grigoryan, the "anti-Russian sentiments [in Armenia] can be expected to grow" unless Russia transfers the case's jurisdiction to Armenia.

=== Armenia–Russia relations ===
The response of the Russian government was criticised from within Russia as being potentially damaging to bilateral relations.

Armenian analyst Richard Giragosian, in an opinion piece for Al Jazeera, "Armenia can't count on Russia any more", predicted long-term political effects of the massacre by writing: "this unexpected challenge to Armenia's reliance on Russia will not dissipate any time soon".

Russian sociologist and historian Sergey Arutyunov (ru) stated that the killings could damage relations between Armenia and Russia.

=== 102nd Base and its future ===
The massacre triggered calls for the removal of the Russian base in Gyumri. Analyst Saro Saroyan, writing for the independent Hetq Online, concluded that the base's future depends on the relations and possible partnership between Iran and the West and the "strategic partnership" between Russia and Azerbaijan.

On February 7, 2015 Raffi Hovannisian, the leader of the national liberal Heritage party called for the removal of the Gyumri base if Permyakov is not handed over to Armenia.

According to Russian media reports, an unnamed source in the General Staff of the Russian Armed Forces declared that the 102nd base "will be staffed exclusively by personnel serving under contracts starting from the spring of 2016."

== Reactions ==
=== Armenia ===
The office of President of Armenia Serzh Sargsyan released a statement on January 12 saying "Currently, all necessary steps are being taken to find the perpetrator of this barbarian act, and these steps are under the direct control of the president." On the same day the president held a consultation with the heads of law enforcement agencies.

The parliamentary party Heritage demanded the severe punishment of the perpetrator(s) of the massacre.

On January 19 President Serzh Sargsyan's office issued a statement offering condolences regarding the death of Seryozha Avetisyan.

=== Russia ===
The Russian embassy in Yerevan expressing condolences in a statement, saying Armenia and Russia are working together on the case. The Foreign Ministry also extend condolences to the relatives of the deceased and affirmed that the ministry provide all the necessary assistance.

In response to protests in Gyumri and Yerevan, Russian Ambassador in Armenia Ivan Volynkin stated "this problem must not be politicized. Crime has no nationality, especially in this case. We must not make politics of this."

On January 18, almost a week after the massacre, Russian President Vladimir Putin expressed his condolences in a call with President Serzh Sargsyan. He also stated that he is confident that "the investigation will be completed as soon as possible and the perpetrator will be punished".

Foreign Minister Sergey Lavrov stated: "We can see attempts of politicizing this situation that stem neither from the Armenian government, nor from Russia. There are many who desire to use this tragedy in order to receive its geopolitical dividends."

On January 20 Russian Investigative Committee spokesman Vladimir Markin said the investigation and criminal proceedings against Permyakov "will be held exclusively on Armenian soil."

=== Other ===
Ambassadors of the United States, United Kingdom, France, Georgia, and Lithuania offered condolences. on February 16, 2015, Georgia's Parliament Speaker Davit Usupashvili stated during his visit to Armenia: "We are standing next to you and share your pain of the Gyumri tragedy."

== Conspiracy theories ==
Conspiracy theories spread in Armenia about the possible causes of the massacre, mostly involving Azerbaijan or Turkey. Tevan Poghosyan, a Member of Parliament from the Heritage party, suggested the massacre was a "part of a foreign subversive operation". He added that "Azerbaijan's intelligence service might have recruited Permyakov, and this could have explained the Russian soldier's attempt to cross the border into Turkey."
