= Maria Golovnina =

Japanese-Russian journalist

- Born: 4 June 1980; RSFSR, USSR
- Died: 23 February 2015 (aged 34); Islamabad, Pakistan
- Cause of death: Asphyxiation
- Occupation: Journalist
- Years active: 2001-2015

Maria Golovnina (Russian: Мария Васильевна Головнина; 4 June 1980 – 23 February 2015), was a Japanese-Russian journalist, best known for her reporting in Central Asia, being the Reuters bureau chief for Afghanistan and Pakistan, and for the circumstances of her death.

Golovnina was referred to as "one of the greats" of Reuters by the agency's former head of Europe, Middle East and Africa, Michael Stott.

== Personal life ==
Golovnina was born in Russia, and raised in Japan. Her father was long time ITAR-TASS Tokyo correspondent Vasily Golovnin. She was distantly related to the Russian explorer Vasily Golovnin.

Although her first languages were Russian and Japanese, her reporting for Reuters was largely in English.

== Career ==
Golovnina began working for Reuters in 2001 in Tokyo. She worked in London, Singapore and Seoul before being posted in Russia from 2002 to 2005, where she covered topics such as the Moscow theater hostage crisis. In 2005, she became Reuters' chief correspondent in Central Asia. She covered the presidential election in Afghanistan in 2009 and did several stints in Iraq. She moved to the London editing desk in 2010. In 2011, she traveled to Tripoli to cover the Libyan Civil War, where she was a part of the team that received Reuters' first Pulitzer Prize nomination in its history. In 2013, she became Reuters' bureau chief for Afghanistan and Pakistan, a position she held until her death in 2015.

In 2010 Golovnina saved the life of Reuters’ photographer Shamil Zhumatov in Kyrgyzstan, who had been attacked and beaten by a crowd of protesters in the central square of Bishkek. Golovnina rallied other journalists and a crowd of locals and convinced the protesters to release Zhumatov who she then took to a hospital.

== Death ==
In 2015, Golovnina was found unconscious in the bathroom of her office in Islamabad, after reporting that she felt sick to her stomach, and was rushed to hospital but died on the way, at the age of 34. Preliminary autopsy findings at the Pakistan Institute for Medical Sciences concluded that she died of asphyxiation due to a blockage in her upper respiratory tract. The autopsy also reported that markings were found around Golovnina's neck, though the cause of the marks has not been determined. Tissue and fluid samples were sent to the Punjab Forensic Science Agency for further analysis, and to rule out poisoning as a cause of death.

A memorial service took place for Maria Golovnina in June 2015, attended by 200 people, at St. Bride's Church, London's so-called journalists' church.
