= Anatoly Shekhovtsov =

Ukrainian scientist

Anatoly Fedorovich Shekhovtsov (Ukrainian:Анатолій Федорович Шеховцов; November 25, 1930 – August 14, 2012) was a Ukrainian scientist in the area of internal combustion engines.

From 1970 to 2001, he was a chairman of the Department of Internal Combustion Engines, Kharkiv Polytechnic Institute, making it one of the leading in Ukraine. From 1979 up to his retirement in 2007 he was a Full Professor of that department. During his career, Anatoly Shekhovtsov established a scientific school, being a scientific advisor for 18 candidates and six doctors of technical sciences, published over 300 scientific papers, including 3 monographs, and over 10 manuals and textbooks.

In 2008, he was awarded the State Prize of Ukraine in the field of Science and Technologies for the "Internal Combustion Engines" series of textbooks.
