= Russian 102nd Military Base =

Russian military base in Armenia

102nd Military Base
- Gyumri, Armenia

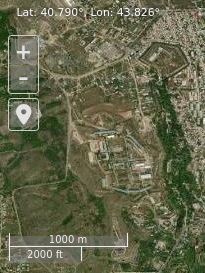
- Satellite imagery of the military base

Site information
- Type: Military Base, former division
- Controlled by: Russian Federation

Location
- Coordinates: 40°47′24.07″N 43°49′32.40″E

Site history
- Built: 1941
- In use: 1940s–present

Garrison information
- Current commander: Colonel Andrey Ruzinsky
- Garrison: 3,000 troops

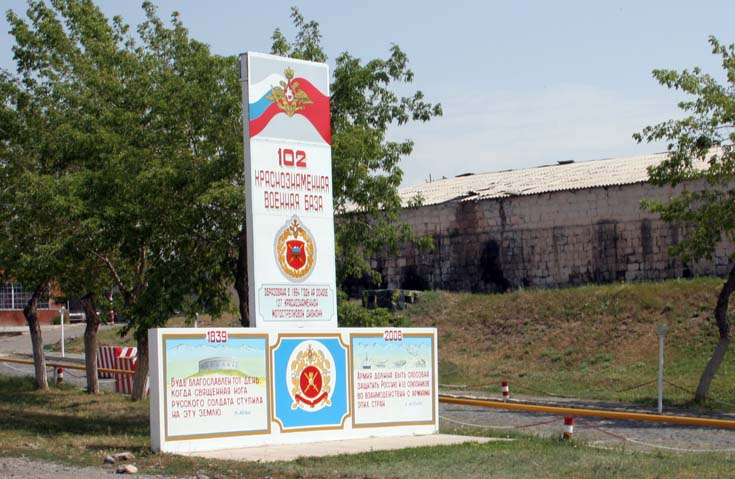
Entrance to the Russian 102nd Military Base

The Russian 102nd Military Base (Armenian: Ռուսական 102-րդ ռազմակայան; Russian: 102-я российская военная база) is a Russian military base in Gyumri, Armenia, under the command of the Southern Military District of the Russian Armed Forces.

During the Soviet era, forces in Armenia were part of the Transcaucasian Group of Forces. It was formerly the base of the 127th Motor Rifle Division of the Soviet Seventh Guards Army. The base is about 120 kilometers (75 mi) north of the Armenian capital, Yerevan. The base is also located near the Armenian-Turkish border.

== History ==
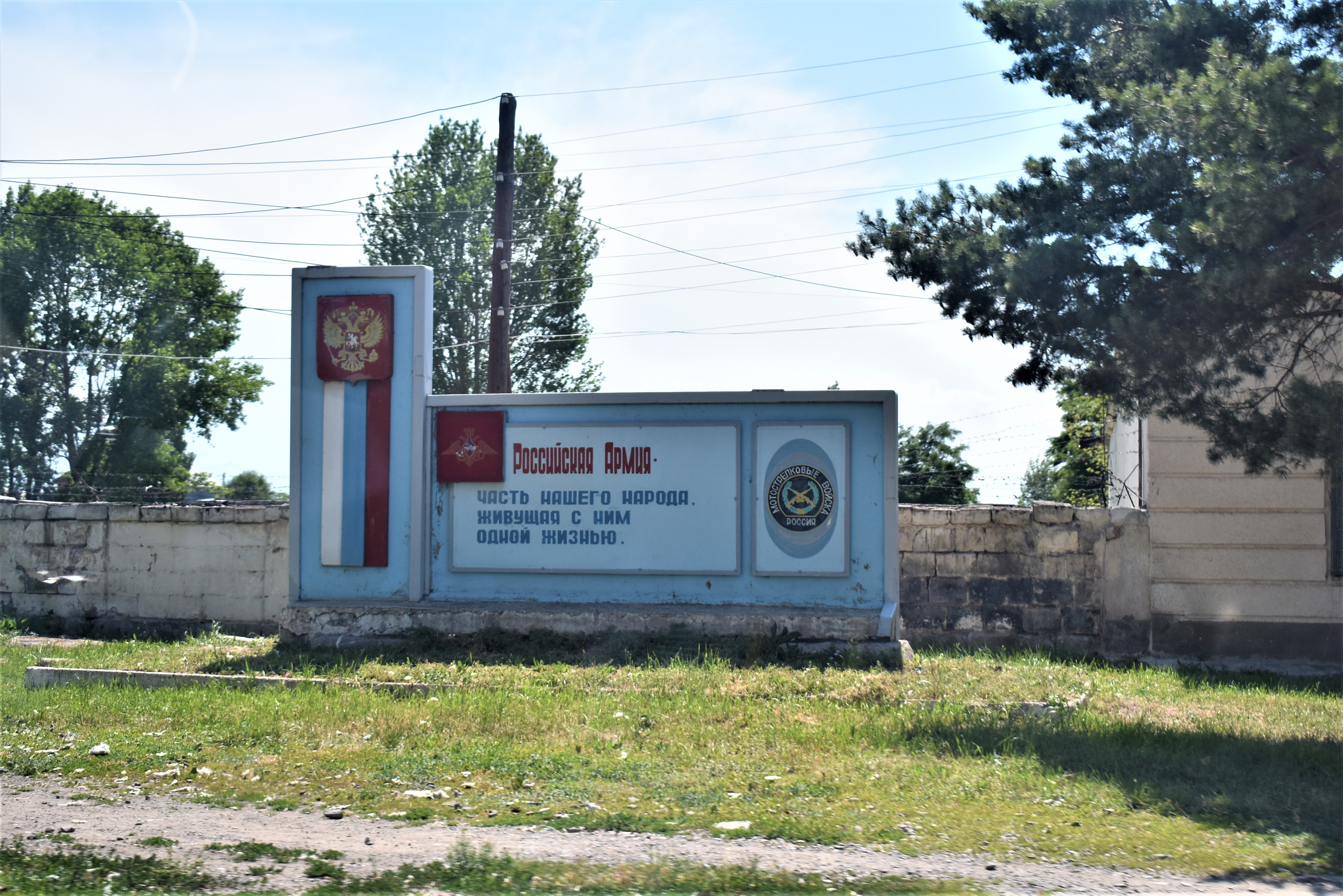
A Russian Army sign near the base

=== World War II ===
The base traces its history to the 261st Rifle Division of the Soviet Union's Red Army. The 261st Rifle Division began forming on 18 July 1941 at Berdiansk in the Odessa Military District. It was made up from a combination of reservists, militia, and volunteers, and its basic order of battle was as follows:

- 974th Rifle Regiment
- 976th Rifle Regiment
- 978th Rifle Regiment
- 809th Artillery Regiment

The division went into Southern Front in August, first as part of 6th Army, but was reassigned to 12th Army, in the same Front, by September 1. It remained with that Army up to at least August 1942 but then was assigned to the Transcaucasian Front's Black Sea Group of Forces. It then spent much of the later part of World War II, from January 1, 1943, onwards with the small 45th Army of the Transcaucasian Front, which was guarding the Soviet borders with Turkey.

=== Postwar ===
After the war ended, the 261st Rifle Division was transferred to Leninakan. It became part of the 7th Guards Army and in 1955 was redesignated as the 37th Rifle Division. On 25 June 1957, it became the 127th Motor Rifle Division. In April 1990, the division's 120th Guards Tank Regiment was divided into the 116th Separate Guards Tank Battalion and the 1360th Motor Rifle Regiment.

=== Armenian Independence ===
Following the dissolution of the Soviet Union, on 21 August 1992 the 127th Motor Rifle Division of the Soviet Army became the 102nd Military Base, the first numbered military base of the successor Russian Ground Forces. A bilateral treaty autorizing the base was signed on March 16, 1995, which was for a term of 25 years with a possible extension by 5 years by unanimous consent. Although Russia does not pay the Armenian government for the military base stationed in Gyumri, the Armenian side takes care of all public utilities, water, electricity, etc.

By the mid-late 1990s the composition of the 127th Motor Rifle Division had changed, following the departure of the majority of the Soviet forces from Armenia. It consisted of the 123rd, 124th, and 128th Motor Rifle Regiments, the 992nd Artillery Regiment, and the 116th Independent Tank Battalion. The 123rd Motor Rifle Regiment was formed from the former 164th Motor Rifle Division, also stationed in Armenia.

In May 1996, the 3624th Air Base, located in the city of Yerevan, became part of the 102nd military base.

In 1997, Armenia and Russia signed a far-reaching friendship treaty, which calls for mutual assistance in the event of a military threat to either party and allows Russian border guards to patrol Armenia’s frontiers with Turkey and Iran.

In August 2003 the base's commanding officer, General Major Alexander Titov, was dismissed for reportedly not maintaining military discipline and allowing corruption and the sale of state equipment. In early 2009, the motorized arm of the base was divided two separate motor rifle brigades.

In 2010 a protocol to the treaty establishing the base was signed, which extended the term of the agreement to 49 years, with the new expiry in 2044.

In 2013, the chief commander of 102nd military base Andrey Ruzinsky said in an interview that "If Azerbaijan decides to restore jurisdiction over Nagorno-Karabakh by force the [Russian] military base may join in the armed conflict in accordance with the Russian Federation’s obligations within the framework of the Collective Security Treaty Organization (CSTO)."

== Present-day ==
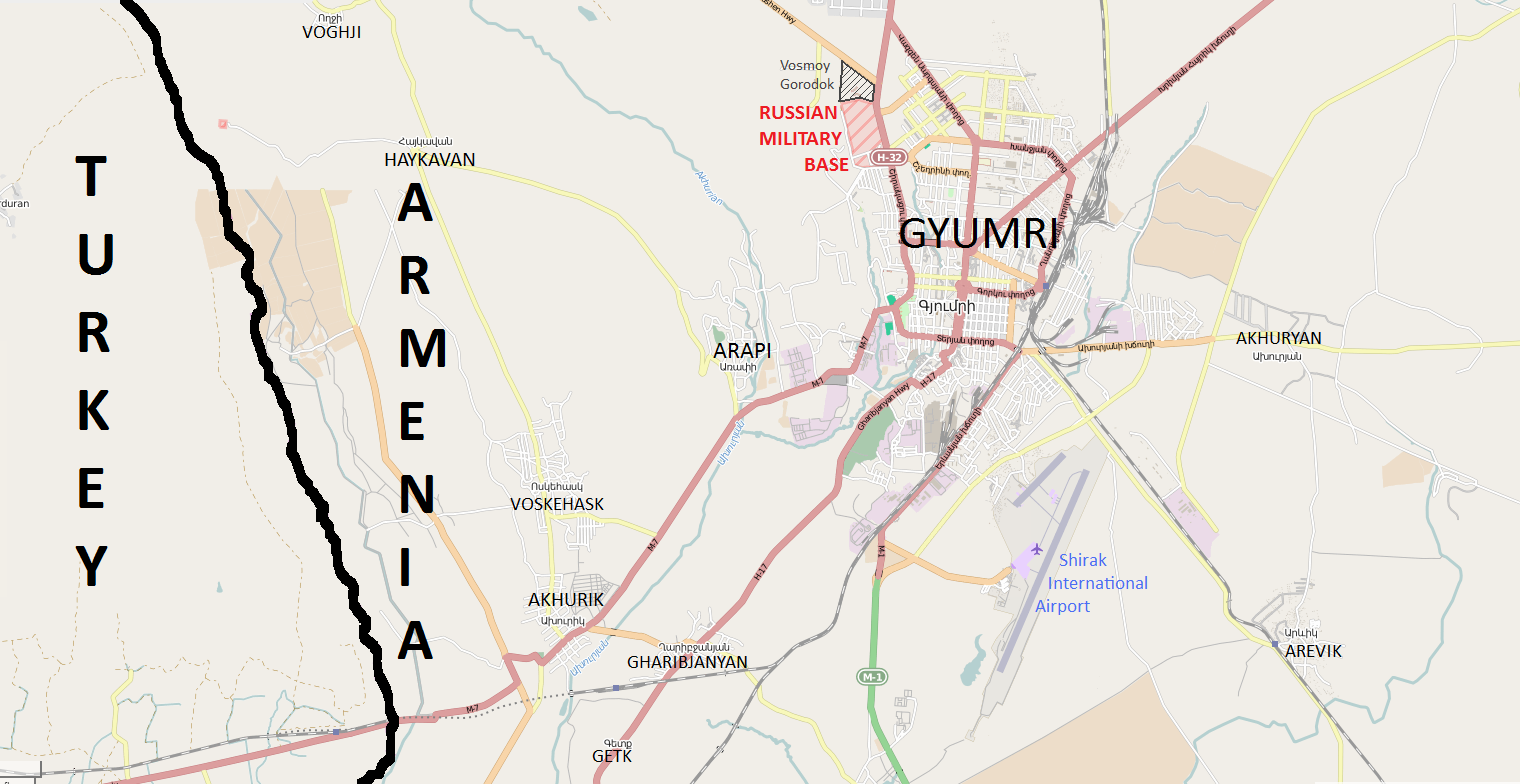
Map of Gyumri and its vicinity. The base is shown in pink. The Gyumri city quarter inhabited by Russian servicemen, known as "Vosmoy Gorodok" (8-й городок) is immediately north of the base (shown in black)

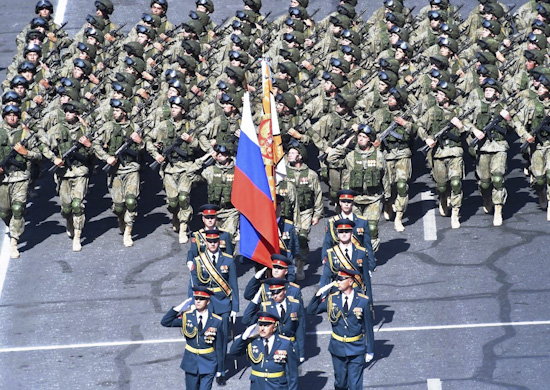
Troops of the base during a parade in Yerevan in 2016.

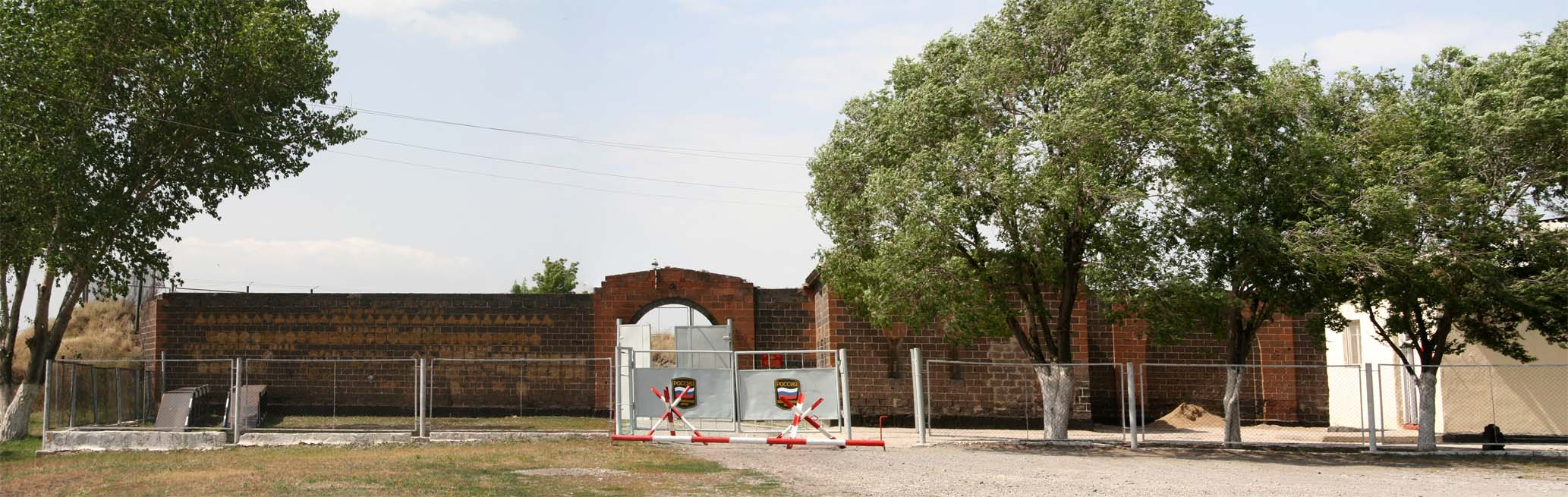
The main gate

There are 3,000 Russian soldiers officially reported to be stationed at the 102nd Military Base located in Gyumri. In early 2005, the 102nd Military Base had 74 tanks, 17 infantry fighting vehicles, 148 armored personnel carriers, 84 artillery pieces, 18 MiG-29 fighters and several batteries of S-300 anti-aircraft missiles. A great deal of military hardware has been moved to the 102nd Base from the Russian 12th Military Base in Batumi and the Russian 62nd Military Base in Akhalkalaki, Georgia which includes 35 tanks and armored vehicles and 370 pieces of military hardware. The military base is part of a joint air defense system of the Commonwealth of Independent States (CIS), which was deployed in Armenia in 1995. Furthermore, the Armenian Air Force relies partially upon the Russian MiG-29s, located at the military base, for the defense of Armenia's airspace.

In September 2026, after Russian President Vladimir Putin had said that it was willing to close the base if Armenia determined it was no longer required, Armenian Prime Minister Nikol Pashinyan stated that Armenia did not view it as a vital necessity, and would not object if Moscow decided to close it and withdraw its military presence.

=== Supply to the base ===
A special five-year agreement concluded with Georgia on March 31, 2006, allowed Russia access to the 102nd Military Base through Georgia's land and airspace. The agreement prohibited Russia from handing over any armament transited through Georgian territory to a third country and from transiting biological, nuclear or chemical substances, as well as weapons of mass destruction or their components. It further stipulated that the amount of military cargo should have been agreed between Russia and Georgia one year in advance. Furthermore, Georgia could refuse the transit if it posed a threat to its national security or if the final destination of the transited military cargo was a location within a conflict zone or a warring state. In December 2006, Russia accused Georgia of "sabotaging" the cargoes destined for the 102nd Military Base.

The transit of Russian military personnel and cargo was suspended by the government of Georgia in the aftermath of the 2008 war with Russia. Upon expiration of its five-year term, on April 19, 2011, the Parliament of Georgia annulled the 2006 agreement with Russia.

== Controversy ==
The question about the presence of the Russian military base in Armenia has been raised in the European Commission. Some argue that the presence of the base serves an obstacle to Western investment and reforms and that the Armenian public and political system that is too closely linked with the Russian leadership. However, most analysts and the Armenian government consider Russia the guarantor of Armenia's territorial integrity since it forms one triad of Armenia's national security framework.

=== Incidents ===
On 14 April 1999, two drunken soldiers, Denis Popov and Alexander Kamenev, armed with AK-74 rifles, went into the town and started a gunfight, killing two men, Vaghinak Simonyan and David Soghomonyan, and injuring 14. The two men were tried in Armenia, where Popov was sentenced to 14 years in prison and Kamenev to 15. Whether or not the two served their entire terms in Armenia is unclear and little is known about this court’s investigation and punishment. In an interview published on January 16 with News.am, Popov’s lawyer, Tamara Yailoian, claimed that her former client had been transferred to Russia “after two to three years,” and, “we later learned, set free.”

On 11 June 2004, a group of men attempted to enter the base and the soldiers stationed there opened fire on them killing Artur Pogosyan and Armen Aroyan, and injuring two others.

Two children Artur Mkrtchyan and Mushegh Gevorgyan were killed by a mine on the training field in the vicinity of the military base on 7 April 2013. The field was not fenced or signed to give proper warning, but nonetheless the command of the military based never punished anyone and also ignored the official complaints of the locals.

On 12 January 2015 an Armenian family of seven was massacred in their house at night by Russian deserter Valery Permyakov from the military base. He was soon apprehended, and anti-government and anti-Russian rallies ensued in Yerevan and Gyumri.

A June 2015 poll in Armenia found that 55% of respondents "find the presence of any other state’s or structure’s military bases in Armenia acceptable", mostly citing the need of protection against Turkey (24%) and Azerbaijan (16%).

In July 2020, a Russian serviceman was found dead in an apartment he rented in the city. On November 26, another Russian serviceman was found dead outside of the base.

== 127th Motor Rifle Division Order of Battle, 1989–90 ==
This listing is taken from Lenskii & Tsybin's The Soviet Ground Forces in the last years of the USSR (St Petersburg, 2001). The city of Gyumri was known as Leninakan up to 1990.

- 107th Motor Rifle Regiment (Leninakan/Ленинакан): 10 T-72s; 3 BMPs (1 BMP-1, 2 BRM-1Ks); 12 D-30s; 2 R-145BM, 1 BTR-50PUM; 15 МТ-LBs
- 124th Motor Rifle Regiment (Leninakan): 10 Т-72s; 87 BTRs (81 BTR-70s, 6 BTR-60s), 3 BMPs (1 BMP-1, 2 BRM-1Ks); 12 D-30s; 1 R-145BM, 1 BTR-50PUM; 15 МТ-LBs
- 128th Motor Rifle Regiment (Leninakan): 10 Т-72s; 110 BMPs (41 BMP-2s, 64 BMP-1s, 5 BRM-1Ks), 2 BTR-70s; 12 2S1 Gvozdikas; 2 BMP-1KSh, 4 R-145BM, 3 PU-12s; 1 МТU-20
- 1360th Motor Rifle Regiment (Leninakan): 12 D-30s; 3 1V18s, 1 1V19, 3 R-145BMs
- 120th Tank Regiment (Leninakan): 31 BTR-70s; 14 BМPs (5 BMP-2s, 5 BMP-1s, 4 BRM-1Ks), 2 BTR-70s; 1 BMP-1KShs, 2 R-145BMs; 1 BRDM-2; 2 МТU-20s
- 992nd Artillery Regiment (Leninakan): 36 D-30s; 12 BM-21 Grads
- 988th Anti-Aircraft Rocket Regiment
- 357th Separate Rocket Battalion (SSMs)
- 772nd Separate Reconnaissance Battalion (Leninakan): 1 R-145BM
- 628th Separate Signal Battalion (Leninakan): 12 R-145BM, 1 BTR-50PU
- 550th Separate Engineer-Sapper Battalion (Leninakan): 1 UR-67
- 626th Separate Battalion of Chemical Protection (отдельный батальон химической защиты)
- 174th Separate Repair and Refurbishment Battalion (отдельный ремонтно-восстановительный батальон)
- 1552nd Separate Battalion of Material Maintenance (отдельный батальон материального обеспечения)

On 19 November 1990 the 127th MRD had the following equipment:

- 61 tanks (T-72s);
- 130 BMPs (46 BMP-2s, 71 BMP-1s, 13 BRM-1Ks);
- 91 BTRs (85 BTR-70s, 6 BTR-60s);
- 12 2S1 Gvozdika self-propelled guns
- 72 D-30 artillery pieces;
- 12 BM-21 Grads

According to some unconfirmed reports of October 2020, amid the 2020 Nagorno-Karabakh conflict, the Krasukha electronic warfare system has been placed in the base to counter the Turkish-made Bayraktar armed drones used by Azerbaijan during the conflict against Armenian forces.

== 102nd Military Base, Order of Battle ==
- Brigade-sized Unit: Three motorized rifle regiments and one tank battalion
- 988th Anti-Aircraft Missile Regiment: S-300V SAM system/S-125 Neva/Krug SAM systems
- 3624th Aviation Base (Erebuni airfield): MiG-29/S/UB, Su-30SM multi-role fighters, Mi-8MT transport helicopters, and Mi-24P gunships (subordinate to the 4th Air and Air Defence Army - Rostov-on-Don)

== See also ==
- Armed Forces of Armenia
- List of Russian military bases abroad
- Collective Security Treaty Organization (CSTO)
- 2015 Gyumri massacre
