= Valeri Poluyanov =

Soviet footballer

Personal information
- Full name: Valeri Grigorievich Poluyanov
- Date of birth: 7 February 1943
- Place of birth: Soviet Union
- Date of death: 9 February 2015 (aged 72)
- Place of death: Mykolaiv, Ukraine
- Position: Forward

Senior career*
Years	Team	Apps	(Gls)
?	FC Trubnik Kamensk-Uralsky	?	(?)
1966–1967	FC Vostok	55	(13)
1968	FC KUZBASS Kemerovo	20	(4)
1969	MFC Mykolaiv	35	(3)
1970	FC Enerhiya Nova Kakhovka	?	(?)
- * Club domestic league appearances and goals

Valeri Grigorievich Poluyanov (Russian: Вале́рий Григо́рьевич Полуя́нов; 7 February 1943 – 9 February 2015) was a Soviet association football forward. In the semifinals of the 1969 Soviet Cup, his team, MFC Mykolaiv, lost to eventual champion FC Karpaty Lviv.
