= Viktor Shekhovtsev =

Soviet footballer and Ukrainian coach

Personal information
- Full name: Viktor Fedorovych Shekhovtsev
- Date of birth: 23 April 1940
- Place of birth: Moscow, Soviet Union
- Date of death: 1 February 2015 (aged 74)
- Place of death: Mykolaiv, Ukraine
- Position: Midfielder

Senior career*
Years	Team	Apps	(Gls)
1960–1961	FC Khimik Novomoskovsk	39	(0)
1962–1963	FC Krylia Sovetov Samara	23	(0)
1964	FC Metalist Kharkiv	19	(1)
1965	FC Khimik Novomoskovsk	34	(5)
1966–1973	MFC Mykolaiv	224	(7)

Managerial career
- 1996–1997: MFC Mykolaiv (ass't)
- * Club domestic league appearances and goals

Víktor Shekhotsev (Ukrainian: Віктор Федорович Ше́ховцев; 23 April 1940 – 1 February 2015) was a Soviet association football midfielder and Ukrainian coach.
