= Crimea. The Way Home =

2015 Russian pseudo-documentary film

- Genre: Pseudo-documentary
- Created by: Andrey Kondrashov
- Directed by: Sergey Kraus
- Starring: Andreii Kondrashov; Vladimir Putin; Sergey Shoygu; Sergey Aksyonov; Natalia Poklonskaya; Dmitrii Tkachiov; Andreii Makarenko
- Country of origin: Russia
- Original language: Russian
- No. of episodes: 1

Production
- Running time: 144 minutes
- Production company: VGTRK

Original release
- Release: March 15, 2015

Crimea. The Way Home (Russian: «Крым. Путь на Родину», romanized: Krym. Put na Rodinu) is a Russian propaganda television documentary about the annexation of Crimea by the Russian Federation in 2014. The film premiered both on Russian channel Rossiya 1 and on YouTube on March 15, 2015.

== Synopsis ==
The film features an interview with Russian President Vladimir Putin disclosing various aspects of the annexation of Crimea. Putin, in particular, revealed that he had taken personal charge of Crimean annexation and that in case of an "unfavorable scenario on the peninsula", Russia could have placed its nuclear weapons on combat readiness.

In the documentary, Putin said that he informed Russian top security officials of his intent to annex Crimea on 24 February 2014. Putin claimed his decision to deploy Russian troops in Crimea was necessary to protect the population of Crimea "from violence and repression by Ukrainian nationalists."

== Production ==
The film was produced over the course of eight months in Sevastopol, Simferopol, Kerch, Yalta, and other Crimean localities. Aside from Putin's interview, other interviews with participants and witnesses of Crimean crisis were recorded. A total of 398 hours were shot, of which roughly 2.5 hours were chosen for the film.

== Reception ==
Before the film's release the Prime Minister of Ukraine Arseniy Yatsenyuk asked the Ukrainian Ministry of Justice to send the film to the International Criminal Court. According to TNS Gallup Media, on the next day after the premiere the film had a TV rating of 40.6%. In Moscow, the film was watched by over 3 million people. The film was not without its critics in Russia, such as Liya Akhedzhakova and Victor Shenderovich.

== Awards and nominations ==
On 25 July 2015, the film was a nominee in the category "TV Event of the Season" at Russia's 19th annual TEFI awards, and won a special jury prize "For the comprehension of contemporary history". On 25 August 2015, it received the Grand Prix of the 16th International TV & Cinema Forum "Together" in Yalta.
