= Russian information war against Ukraine =

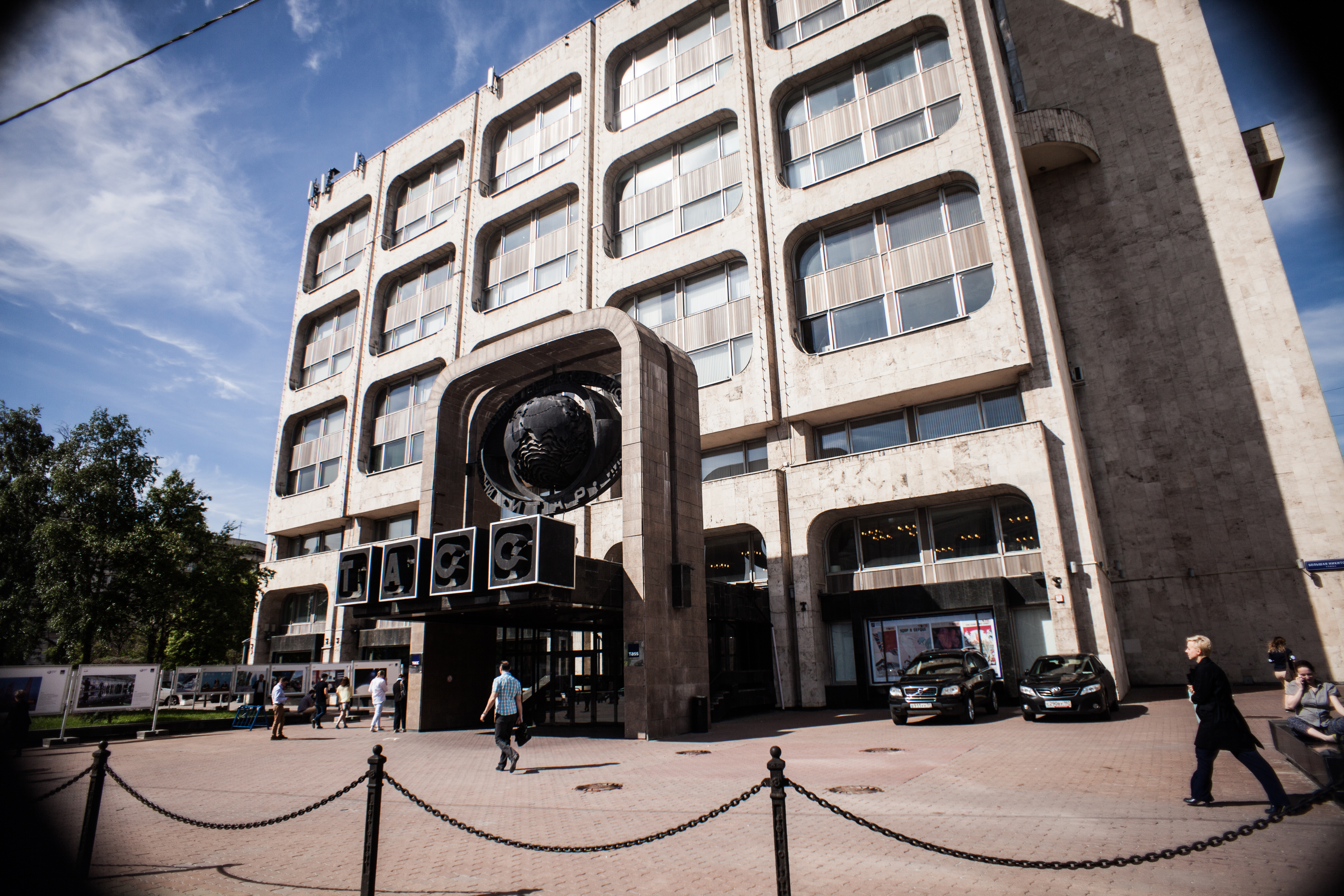
The building of TASS, a Russian state-owned news agency accused of propaganda against Ukraine

The Russian information war against Ukraine refers to Russia weaponising information and communication in order to further its own ends in the context of the Russo-Ukrainian war. The concept of informatsionnaya voyna (Russian: информационная война, lit. 'informational war') encompasses various strategies, including cyberwarfare, often described as technical defenses against technical attacks in warfare; however, cyberwarfare is just one aspect of Russia's information war, which may include shaping national narratives, manipulating the news cycle, and flooding the information space with Russian bots and trolls. The goal is to achieve strategic victory and exert reflexive control.

These efforts were used as part of its disinformation in the Russian invasion of Ukraine. Due to effective censorship, most media outlets in Russia are government-controlled, allowing Kremlin messaging to successfully sway the citizens of the Russian Federation to support its approach in Ukraine. The Kremlin has denied waging war in Ukraine, claiming it only wants to protect Russian speakers against Ukrainian Nazis. This narrative has been reinforced by Russian television since 2014, giving it an advantage through repetition and familiarity. According to a poll, 58 percent of Russians approved of this perspective between 28 February and 3 March 2022.

== Background ==
=== Doctrine ===
Valery Gerasimov, chief of the General Staff of the Armed Forces of the Russian Federation, described a novel type of warfare that incorporates elements of propaganda, demoralization, distraction, and political posturing both in times of peace and war, and above all the importance of social media, beyond both cyberwarfare and information war as NATO understands them. He suggested a 4:1 ratio of nonmilitary to military measures. Nonmilitary tactics also come under the military in Russia, and although United States Marine Corps research suggests that the ratio is still largely aspirational, it indicates recognition of "the utility of nonmilitary measures in interstate confrontation, especially during what would be considered peacetime." The Russian Federation misinforms and misleads its citizens and the audience of its television channels in other countries – Channel One Russia and Russia-24, for example.

=== Reasons for the conflict ===
==== Revanchism ====
Like Ukraine, Belarus and Russia consider the Kievan Rus as their cultural ancestor. Many Russians see Kyiv as the birthplace of their nation. Kievan Rus' reached its greatest extent under Yaroslav the Wise (1019–1054); his sons issued its first written legal code, the Russkaya Pravda, shortly after his death. In the 2000s, Russia waged a large-scale propaganda campaign in Ukraine, based on the doctrine of "Russian world", and Vladimir Putin said "we are one nation. Kyiv is the mother of Russian cities." Its ideological basis was post-Soviet revanchism in the Russian Federation for the cultural, economic, and territorial restoration of pre-1991 borders and the restoration of the former Soviet "zone of influence" in Europe and Asia.

This revanchism sees three categories of the world's population as "Russian": ethnic Russians, regardless of where they live; a Russian-speaking population regardless of nationality; and compatriots who have never lived on the territory of the Russian Empire, the Soviet Union, and other state entities, as well as their descendants. At the 2008 Bucharest summit on 2–4 April, Putin told United States President George W. Bush: "You understand, George, that Ukraine is not even a state! What is Ukraine?"

Many Russians idealize Soviet Russia under the rule of the Communist Party of the Soviet Union as a time of prosperity, and the ruling United Russia party as heir to the country's "glorious past". Since the collapse of the Soviet Union, Russian politicians have talked about restoring Russia's influence in post-Soviet countries. According to Vladimir Bukovsky, a dissident who spent a decade in Soviet prisons before his exile to the West in 1976, Putin was "totally sincere when he called the disintegration of the Soviet Union a 'geopolitical catastrophe'." During an interview with Stanford Times in January 2022, Steven Pifer (former US Ambassador to Ukraine) said that Putin "regularly refers to Russians and Ukrainians as one people, which is an utterly tone-deaf comment that many Ukrainians hear as a denial of their culture, history and language."

Putin sees the growth of NATO in Eastern Europe as an "existential threat", and has written that Russia and Ukraine are really one country. This revanchism focuses on Ukraine, whose withdrawal from the USSR led to its collapse. "Russia is restoring its unity—the tragedy of 1991, this terrible catastrophe in our history, has been overcome", RIA Novosti, Russia's primary online state news agency, exulted on 26 February 2022. The Putin regime contrasts "ours" and "others" in Ukraine, and suggests that violence against "others" is desirable and even required. The Russian government frames its hybrid war as a conflict between Russia and NATO, but while geopolitics and its desire for a post-Soviet sphere play into its focus on Ukraine, so do its domestic politics. An independent Ukrainian democracy might inspire Russians to demand their own democracy and "perhaps even challenge Mr. Putin's authoritarianism."

==== History of the war ====
In June 2014, the Ukrainian National Security and Defense Council of Ukraine (NSDC) obtained materials used to train Russian information war specialists. According to NSDC Secretary Andriy Parubiy, the documents instructed Russian soldiers to "actively influence the consciousness and system of knowledge and ideas of the target country".

Propaganda targeting the Russian people, justifying a future war against Ukraine, appeared even before Russia's first incursion into Ukraine in 2014. In 2009, Maxim Kalashnikov's "Independent Ukraine: Failure of a Project" portrayed Ukraine as a Yugoslavia on the verge of an ethnic breakup. Novels such as Fyodor Berezin's War 2010: Ukrainian Front, Georgiy Savitsky's Battlefield Ukraine: The broken trident and Alexander Sever's Russian-Ukrainian Wars posited a war against Ukraine. Activists said Russia had also waged an information war against Ukraine through cinema.

Kremlin-run media in 2014 created the impression in Crimea that "fascists, anti-Semites and extremists" were in power in Kyiv and chaos ruled the rest of Ukraine, but this had "little or nothing to do with reality". Since Ukraine's independence, Russia has waged a constant information war against it, especially under the pro-Russian President Viktor Yanukovych. In February 2014, for example, Russians flatly denied that their military maneuvers in any way threatened Ukraine: "The Russian Ministry of Foreign Affairs denies the participation of the Black Sea Fleet in destabilizing the situation in Crimea." Of the men who tried to seize the Crimean parliament, Putin said: "These were local self-defense forces."

== Information operations ==
=== Censorship ===
In February 2017, the Russian Minister of Defence acknowledged the existence of "information operations forces" in Russia. In 2021, Open Media, The Moscow Times, and the Moscow bureau of Deutsche Welle were also shut down. A Russian law signed on 4 March 2022 imposed drastic penalties for spreading "false information" or protesting or "discrediting" Russia's actions in Ukraine. Russian schools would have to follow the official curriculum. After the 2022 legislation made it illegal to publish information on the Ukrainian war that the Kremlin deems "false", some Western media withdrew their reporters, due to safety concerns. Independent Russian media outlets shut down, including TV Rain and Novaya Gazeta, whose editor had received the Nobel Peace Prize in 2021. News website Znak announced its closing, and Ekho Moskvy, owned by Kremlin-linked Gazprom, also shut down.

The websites of Deutsche Welle, the BBC, Meduza and Radio Free Europe became inaccessible from within Russia without a VPN. News sites Mediazona, Republic, Snob.ru, and Agentstvo were also blocked from the Russian internet after the law passed, and became available only by VPN. Russia also jammed commercial broadcast signals and penetrated both civilian and military communications networks. Oleksandr Danylyuk, former secretary of Ukraine's National Security and Defense Council, said that "Russia, they own or operate Ukrainian cellular companies, banks, electricity. They don't need to hack anything. It's a secret war conducted by agents of influence."

=== Telecommunications ===
Russia's Leer-3 RB-341V drone system can listen to, or suppress, cellular communications, and even send text messages to front-line soldiers. Ukrainian soldiers have received texted jeers and threats from the Russians on their cell phones, and family members of Ukrainian soldiers have also reported receiving calls saying that those soldiers were dead. The Russian Orlan-10 drone has also been extensively used in electronic warfare in Ukraine.

In a 2016 article, Estonian Military Academy researcher and University of Tartu co-professor for oriental studies Vladimir Sazonov similarly noted that Russian intelligence agencies had been conducting information warfare operations ever since the start of the war in Donbas in 2014. According to Sazonov, amongst the strategies used by Russian agents included sending text messages such as "a huge Russian military contingent will reach Kyiv in three days" and "Russian tanks are about to take over Kharkiv". These messages, which were sent to the mobile phones of Ukrainian soldiers, potential recruits, and their families before each new wave of mobilisation in the country, were intended to demoralise Ukrainians and spread panic amongst civilians.

Lack of tactical communications have been an issue for the Russian military, to the point where some troops in Georgia received their orders from an Air Force officer who arrived by helicopter. Then-president Dmitry Medvedev ordered an expansion of the military's radio system in 2009, with a contract to a manufacturer partially owned by a former Medvedev advisor. The contract was subsequently troubled by allegations of embezzlement.

=== Internet infrastructure ===
On 9 March 2022, Internet service provider Triolan suffered an outage in Kharkiv and other cities caused by a factory reset of several of its devices. Recovery efforts were hampered by shelling in the area at the time, which made it dangerous to go on-site and may have damaged internet connectivity. Attackers had previously disrupted its connectivity and DNS routing on 24 February. National telecoms operator Ukrtelecom in late March also suffered, then recovered from, a major cyber-attack.

In Russia, as of 14 March 2022, peering agreements were still in place but a new regulation was expected that would ban web hosting outside Russia and require the use of official DNS servers. In early March, Transit providers Lumen and Cogent both left Russia, but this had a limited effect on the Russian internet connectivity because they continued to peer with some of the larger Russian ISPs, such as Rostelecom and Rascom, at exchanges outside Russia.

=== War propaganda ===
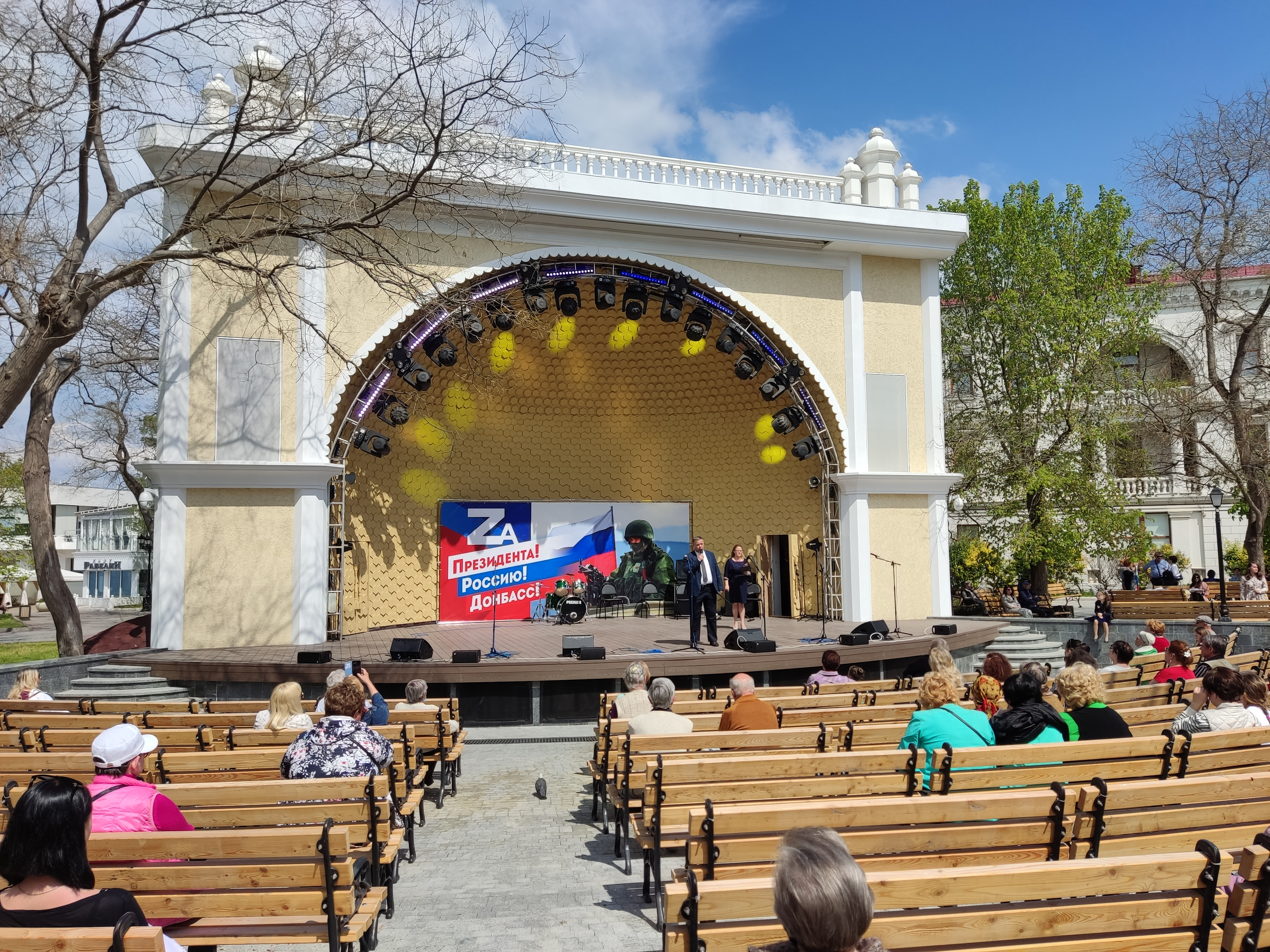
A pro-war propaganda event in Sevastopol, Crimea, 29 April 2022

Information warfare has deep roots in Russia. In addition to presenting a Russian narrative and version of events, it strives to cause confusion and cast doubt on the idea of truth. Russia transmits war propaganda through news media in its ongoing war against Ukraine. As early as September 2008, Alexander Dugin, a Russian fascist known as "Putin's brain", advocated an invasion of Ukraine and other countries that had previously been part of the USSR: "The Soviet empire will be restored. in different ways: by force, diplomacy, economic pressure ... Everything will depend on place and time."

On 28 February 2022 RIA Novosti published, then took down, an incorrect report that Russia had won the Russo-Ukrainian War and that "Ukraine has returned to Russia". On 14 March, Marina Ovsyannikova, an editor at Channel One, interrupted a live broadcast to protest the Russian invasion of Ukraine, carrying a poster that said in Russian and English: "Stop the war, don't believe the propaganda, here you are being lied to." RT, a Russian state-controlled television network, was officially banned in the European Union and suspended by television service providers in several other countries. YouTube blocked RT and Sputnik across Europe to prevent Russian disinformation. Many RT journalists resigned after Russia invaded Ukraine.

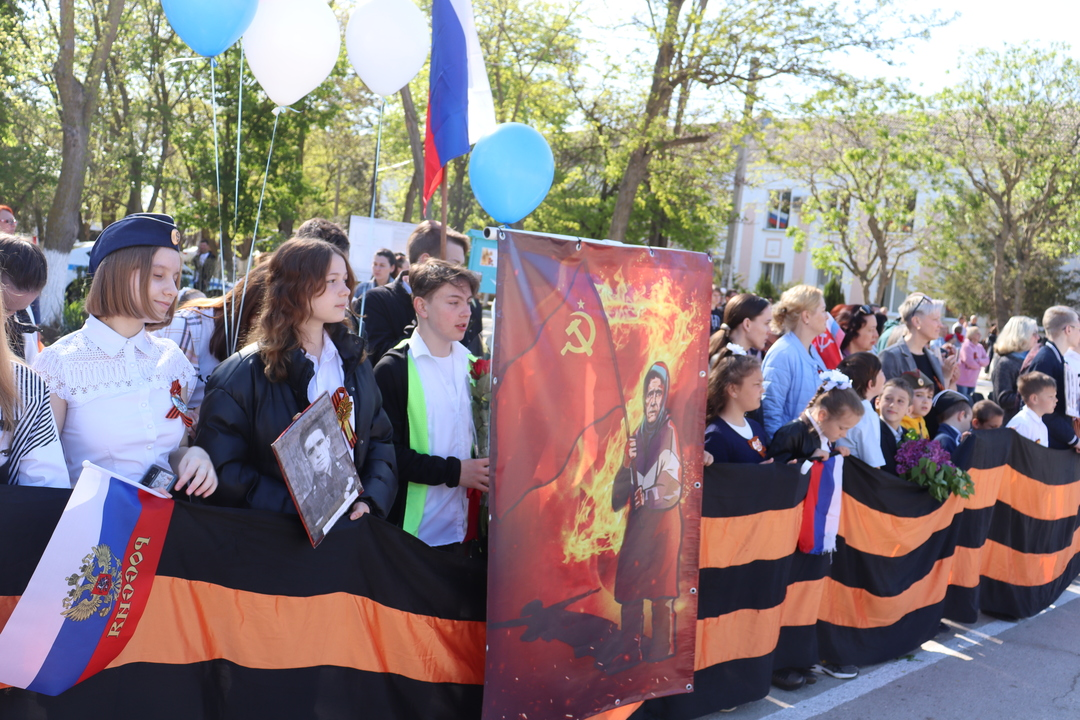
Propaganda poster of grandmother with red flag, Saky, Crimea, 9 May 2022

Russian teachers received detailed instructions on teaching about the invasion of Ukraine. The Mayakovsky Theatre in Moscow received a government email "to refrain from any comments on the course of military actions in Ukraine", warning that any negative comments would be "regarded as treason against the Motherland". The Russian government uses the "Z" symbol as a pro-war propaganda tool; Russian civilians show it as a sign of support for the invasion.

According to Pjotr Sauer of The Guardian, many Russians still support Putin and don't believe that the "special military operation" in Ukraine is related to Russian propaganda and disinformation. Polls conducted by the Levada Center, between 17 and 21 February, found that 60% of respondents blamed the US and NATO for escalating tensions, while only 4% blamed Russia. Similarly, an independent telephone survey from 28 February to 1 March found that 58% of Russian respondents approved of the military operation. However, a series of four online polls by Alexei Navalny's Anti-Corruption Foundation found that, between 25 February and 3 March, the share of respondents in Moscow who considered Russia an "aggressor" increased from 29% to 53%, while the share of those who considered Russia a "peacemaker" fell by half, from 25% to 12%.

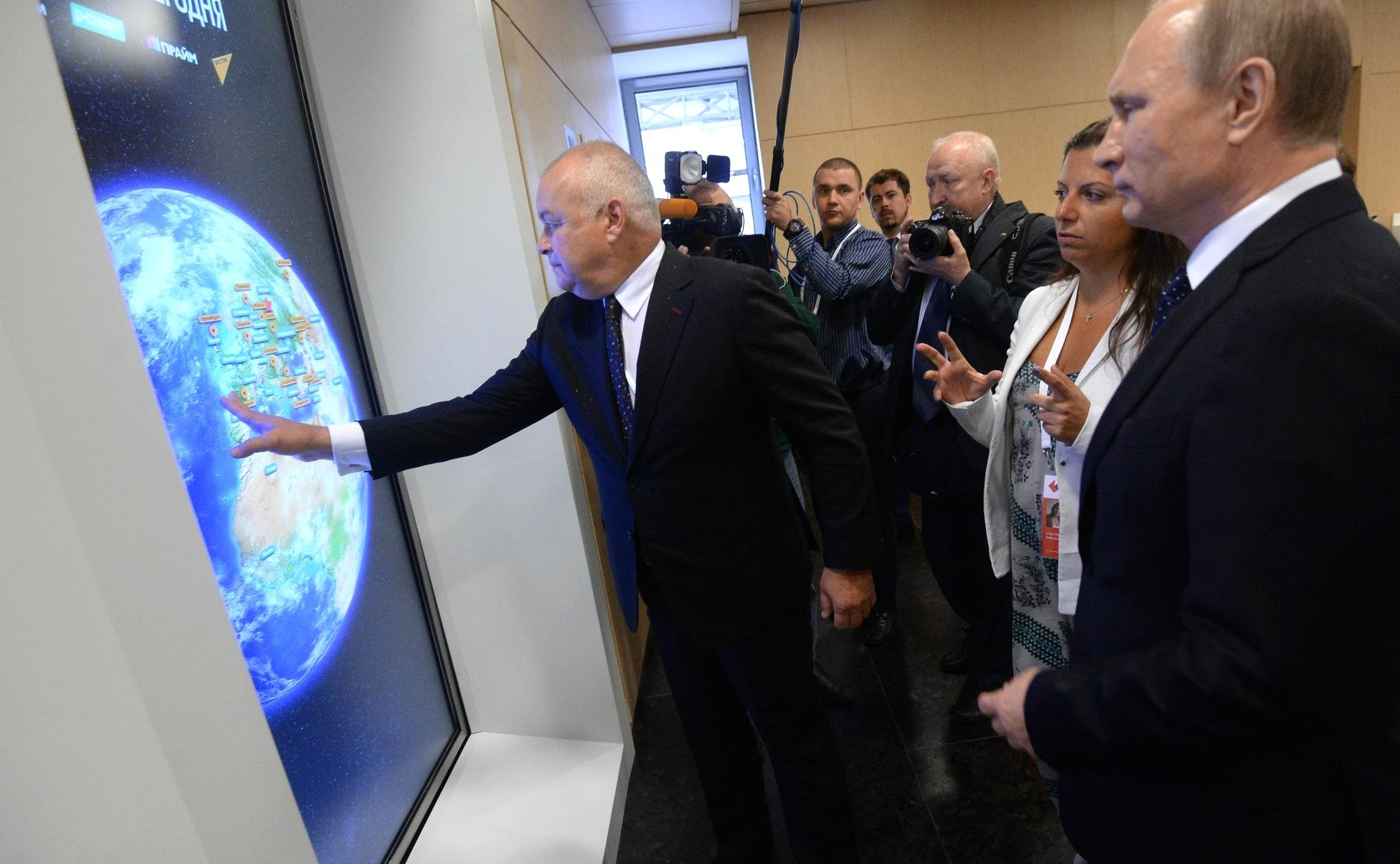
Putin and his propagandists Dmitry Kiselyov and Margarita Simonyan. Most reports in the Russian media about the war in Ukraine focus on alleged atrocities of Ukrainian "fascists" against the people of Donbas.

Some observers have noted a "generational struggle" among Russians over perceptions of the war, with younger Russians generally opposed to it and older Russians more likely to accept the narrative presented by state-controlled media in Russia. Kataryna Wolczuk of Chatham House said, "[Older] Russians are inclined to believe the official narrative that Russia is defending Russian speakers in Ukraine, so it's offering protection rather than aggression." Russian opposition politician Alexei Navalny said the "monstrosity of lies" in the Russian state media "is unimaginable. And, unfortunately, so is its persuasiveness for those without access to alternative information."

On 12 March, YouTube blocked an unspecified number of media outlets controlled by the Russian state, including RT and Sputnik, citing its policy against content that "denies, minimizes, or trivializes well-documented violent events". On 18 March, the British media regulator Ofcom revoked RT's broadcasting licence. On 2 April, it was reported that Putin's approval rating in Russia had risen to 83% a month after the invasion, from a 69% approval rating prior to the invasion during the height of the COVID-19 pandemic.

State-controlled television channels, from which most Russians consume news, presented the invasion as a liberation mission and accused Ukrainian troops of attacking civilian targets. Mediazona, an independent Russian media outlet, reported that the FSB had fabricated a video of a woman accusing Ukraine of war crimes in Mariupol, and shared screenshots of emails instructing media outlets not to reveal the source of the video.

In an op-ed published in the Russian state outlet RIA Novosti, Timofei Sergeytsev openly advocated the "purification" of Ukrainians-blurring the lines between the Ukrainian government, military, and civilians—then the cultural genocide of Ukraine through the obliteration of the Ukrainian name and culture, and finally the reeducation of the remaining civilians, together with a strict regime of censorship in order to incorporate them in a greater Russia. Alexei Navalny tweeted in April 2022 that "warmongers" among Russian state media personalities "should be treated as war criminals". On 13 April 2014, NATO Secretary-General Anders Fogh Rasmussen, in a statement posted on the alliance's website, accused Russia of promoting war and wanting to overthrow Ukraine.

In early 2022, the United States government warned that Russia was planning a false flag operation to invade Ukraine, pointing to "a pattern of Russian behavior" that included invading and occupying parts of Georgia in 2008, and noting Russia's "failure to honor its 1999 commitment to withdraw its troops and munitions from Moldova, where they remain without the government's consent." In 2014, Vladimir Putin called opponents of the war nothing more than "traitors" and a "fifth column". Children's television had also broadcast war propaganda, as when the state-owned channel Carousel broadcast a Good Night, Little Ones! episode in 2014 where the dog character Philya joins the army to become "a real defender". The throttling of information into Russia also starves the Kremlin's own information diet. The Center for Strategic and International Studies wrote in 2022 that the Ukrainian invasion "bears an eerie resemblance to Soviet decision making in 1979 to invade Afghanistan": poor intelligence, misreading the international reaction, over-optimism, and an incomprehension of the costs.

==== Propaganda in other countries ====
Chinese diplomats, government agencies, and state-controlled media in China have used the war as an opportunity to deploy anti-American propaganda, and they have amplified conspiracy theories created by Russia, such as the false claims that public health facilities in Ukraine are "secret US biolabs". Such conspiracy theories have also been promoted by Cuban state media. Russian propaganda has also been repeated by the state-controlled outlets of other countries, such as Serbia, and also Iran. In Iran, the state media criticised the British embassy in Tehran after it raised the Ukrainian flag in support of Ukraine. Reports from Sputnik have been actively republished by Iran's pro-regime media. In Latin America, RT Actualidad is a popular channel that has spread disinformation about the war. Authorities in Vietnam have instructed reporters not to use the word "invasion" and to minimize coverage of the war. In South Africa, the governing African National Congress published an article, in its weekly newsletter ANC Today, endorsing the notion that Russia had invaded Ukraine to denazify it.

=== Control of news outlets ===
==== Public relations ====
Russia has learned to use respected Western media—such as BBC News, Reuters, and AFP—to promote anti-Ukrainian propaganda. These media outlets were unprepared for the Russian-Ukrainian war in 2014, and often became unintentional distributors of Russian anti-Ukrainian propaganda. Russia has also learned to skillfully use Western public relations (PR) companies to disseminate narratives that serve the interests of various Russian government institutions and private corporations. The Kremlin has instructed official Russian television outlets to rebroadcast clips of Tucker Carlson's television shows "as much as possible". Marjorie Taylor Greene has also received favorable coverage on Kremlin media, as when she said that the US was responsible for the 2014 overthrow of the Russian puppet government in the Ukrainian Revolution of Dignity.

==== Ukraine ====
Many Ukrainian news outlets are financed by wealthy investors. Some of these investors have close ties to Russian political power. This highly concentrated ownership of Ukrainian media has set a high barrier to entry to the market. Four financial-political groups control nearly all broadcasting in Ukraine. The top 20 most-viewed TV channels almost all belong to Ukraine's wealthiest oligarchs:

- Rinat Akhmetov, richest man in Ukraine, who supports the Opposition Bloc, the successor to the Party of Regions, the party of President Viktor Yanukovych, who was ousted in 2014. He reportedly controls Media Group Ukraine.
- Viktor Pinchuk – owner of four TV channels and a popular tabloid, Fakty i Kommentarii. He has been a member of the Ukrainian parliament.
- Dmytro Firtash described as a "Kremlin influence agent in Ukraine". With his business partner Serhiy Liovochkin, he is affiliated with the openly pro-Russian Opposition Platform – For Life, which is led by Viktor Medvedchuk. He denies having ties to crime boss Semion Mogilevich
- Serhiy Liovochkin – ran Office of the President of Ukraine for Yanukovych.
- Igor Kolomoisky – majority shareholder of 1+1 Media Group.
- Petro Poroshenko – president of Ukraine from 2014 to 2019.
- Viktor Medvedchuk – often referred to as a "grey cardinal of Ukraine"; important voice of the Kremlin there; put under house arrest on 13 May 2021; allegedly was supported and funded by the Kremlin. Owner of the first independent Ukrainian TV channels 112 Ukraine and ZIK.
- Yevhen Murayev's NewsOne and Nash TV essentially replaced Medvedchuk's pro-Russian outlets and received the same funding.

A decline in advertising revenues has left media outlets even more dependent on support from politicised owners, hence hindering their editorial independence. Paid content disguised as news (known as jeansa) remains widespread in the Ukrainian media, weakening their and their journalists' credibility, especially during electoral campaigns. Media ownership remains opaque, despite a February 2014 bill requiring full disclosure of ownership structures.

- Inter Media Group is linked to gas trader Dmytro Firtash and Yanukovych-linked politician Serhiy Lyovochkin. The channel is part of GDF Media Limited since Dmytro Firtash bought 100 percent of InterInter Media Group Limited (back) from Valeriy Khoroshkovskyi on 1 February 2013.
- StarLightMedia is linked to the billionaire Viktor Pinchuk and includes six television and several other media and advertising companies.
- 1+1 Media Group is deemed owned by Ihor Kolomoyskyi, who in March 2014 was appointed governor of Dnipropetrovsk.
- 5 Kanal TV channel remains owned by the former president of Ukraine, Petro Poroshenko, despite criticism of the conflict of interest.
- UMH group was once controlled by Serhiy Kurchenko.
- Internet publications strana.ua and vesti.ua.

Oligarch-owned media outlets under the control of Rinat Akhmetov:

- Media Group Ukraine owns the following subsidiaries:
  - youth entertainment TV channel NLO-TV
  - News channel Ukraine 24, national FTA TV channel
  - Thematic TV channels Football 1, Football 2, Football 3
  - Regional TV channel Channel 34
  - Segodnya Multimedia
- Telecom Ukrtelecom
- SCM Holdings, which holds the following subsidiaries: Akhmetov has been its sole proprietor since 2009.
  - Landline business Vega Telecom.
  - Russian-language newspaper Segodnya, which has drawn criticism for coverage allegedly favoring certain politicians and public figures according to journalists at the paper.

==== Russia ====
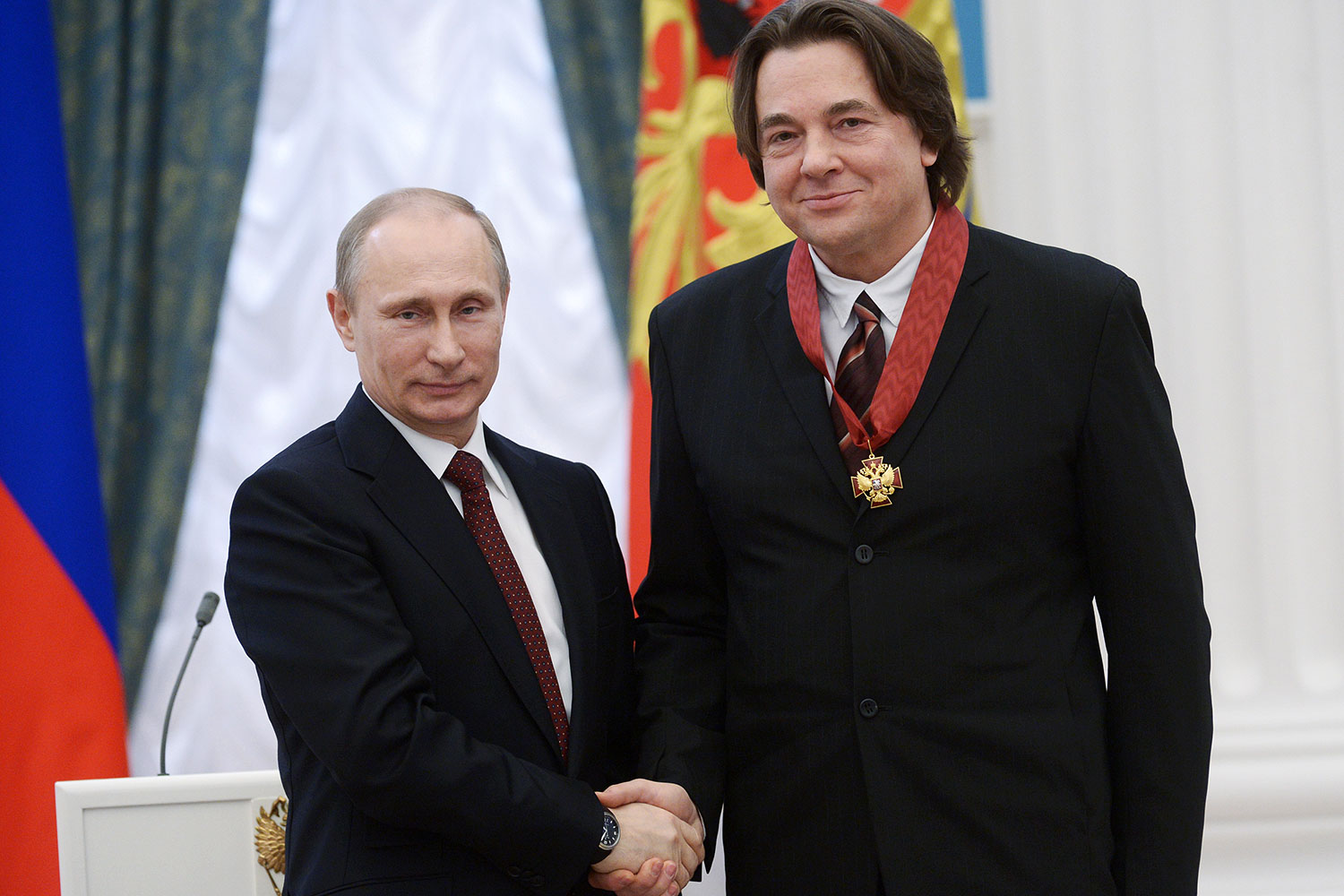
Putin and Konstantin Ernst, chief of Russia's main state-controlled TV station Channel One

About 85% of Russians get most of their information from Russian state media. Russian media have been used for propaganda to persuade domestic and world audiences. Among the best-known are Sputnik, RT (formerly RussiaToday), RIA Novosti, and Life (formerly LifeNews). Employees of Russian news outlets have been resigning since the 2022 incursion into Ukraine: "English-language RT staff member and one frequent RT contributor in Moscow have quit the network in recent days over the editorial position on the war, the Guardian has learned." Zhanna Agalakova, a correspondent for two decades for Pervy Kanal (Channel One) in New York and Paris, announced in March that she was leaving over the invasion. Liliya Gildeyeva, an anchor on the state-run channel NTV, also resigned. Marina Ovsyannikova has been hired by the German media company Die Welt, a month after she drew worldwide attention for bursting onto the set of a live broadcast on Russian state television to protest the war in Ukraine.

===== RT =====
RT is an important Russian weapon in the information war. In 2014, John Kerry, then United States Secretary of State, called it a state-sponsored "propaganda bullhorn". Its audience in 2015 was 700 million people in more than 100 countries.

RT's 2015 budget, according to its website, was 13.85 billion rubles (about $220 million at 2015 exchange rates). However, in a 2015 interview with the Russian independent media outlet Dozhd TV, Simonyan said the budget for that year was 18 billion rubles. The RT website claims its 2016 budget was $275 million (17 billion rubles), while a video published by RT contradicts this information by claiming its 2016 budget was $300 million (21 billion rubles). In 2019, RT announced on its Telegram channel that RT and Rossiya Segodnya's budget from federal funding was $440 million, yet the official federal budget number for 2019 was $430 million.

In 2012, RT had the highest government spending per employee in the world, $183 thousand per person. As of 2014, Russia had spent more than $9 billion on its propaganda. In 2021, it increased the state media budget to 211 billion rubles (about $2.8 billion), 34 billion rubles ($460 million) more than the previous year.

==== Russian interference with Ukrainian media ====
On 6 March 2014, "1 + 1" and Channel 5 in the territory of the Autonomous Republic of Crimea were turned off and Russia 24 captured the broadcasting frequencies of Crimea's private "Chernomorskaya TV and Radio Company". In Simferopol, state television and radio broadcaster Krym was surrounded by people in camouflage uniforms. General Director Stepan Gulevaty called the police, but they did not respond. On 6 March 2014, an Internet poll on the ATR TV website found that most respondents opposed the annexation of Crimea. The next day the Russian military in Crimea disconnected the ATR website. They also shut down the analogue broadcast signal of the Ukrainian TV channel Inter, on whose frequencies NTV is broadcast. On 10 August 2014, the German provider Hetzner Online AG sent a letter of apology to Glavkom. The provider had previously moved to block Glavkom at the request of the Russian Roskomnadzor for publishing material about the mock demonstration for the federalization of Siberia.

In July 2019, Hetzner Online warned The Ukrainian Week that the site would be blocked until "extremist content" was removed. The provider had received a request to do this from Roskomnadzor, which considers the website's 2015 material on Right Sector a violation of Russian legislation. For several months, distributed denial-of-service attacks (DDoS) were carried out against Ukrainian information sites—Censor.NET, Tizhden.ua, Ukrayinska Pravda, and others, as well as the website of the Ministry of Internal Affairs of Ukraine—during which ads for former-president Yanukovych were broadcast. Similarly, in January 2022 Ukrainian cyber official Victor Zhora reported attacks on over 90 websites of 22 government groups on 14 January 2022. About 50 websites were vandalized while the remainder suffered some damage.

=== Methods and resources ===
==== Disinformation ====
Russia uses disinformation: to support an image of its greatness and importance or of the weakness of its enemies, or sometimes to deny its own actions. Kyiv "hasn't been bombed by anyone", Channel One pundit Artyom Sheynin assured viewers on 24 February 2022, for example. Also on 24 February, "explosions and gunfire were heard through the day in Ukraine's capital and elsewhere in the country, with at least 70 people reported killed", according to Reuters. Most Russians get their information from television, although younger Russians tend to prefer online sources. These now require a VPN connection, making the truth now "mostly [being] discovered by people who already distrust the Kremlin and its state-sponsored media."

The untethering of Russian news sources from facts does not just affect the populace. The Kremlin has been described as "a bunch of old men who can't quite get over the fact that they're no longer running a superpower, and who also are increasingly surrounded by people who tell them what they want to hear". Other more subtle attacks, known as reflexive control, systematically distort and reinterpret words, leading "extremists" to become an accepted description of independent journalists and human rights activists, or for peaceful demonstrators to be arrested as security threats.

In February 2026, BBC Verify said that a major Russian disinformation operation was using the 2026 Winter Olympics to paint Ukrainian fans and athletes in a bad light using fake news stories, with the goal of undermining Western support for Ukraine.

===== Falsehoods and adamant denials =====
Greg Pryatt, former US ambassador to Ukraine, said: "You could spend every hour of every day trying to bat down every lie, to the point where you don't achieve anything else. And that's exactly what the Kremlin wants."^{:59}

====== 2014 ======
In November 2013, the pro-Russian Ukrainian president Viktor Yanukovych blocked the legislatively-approved (in the Verkhovna Rada, Ukraine's parliament) course towards European integration, and the Revolution of Dignity began. Putin "used disinformation to lay the groundwork to annex Crimea in 2014, and to support continued fighting in Ukraine's Eastern provinces of Donetsk and Luhansk", wrote Forbes contributor Jill Goldenziel. In 2014, Putin denied for quite some time sending troops into Ukraine. He later said Russia was "protecting" the Russian-speaking population of Ukraine. When Russia invaded Georgia in 2008, it gave many alternative explanations for its actions there as well, and denied having plans to attack it. That same year, Putin again denied his invasion, despite photos of military vehicles there from the North Caucasus Military District. The soldiers had forgotten to camouflage an icon of the Guards Division on one vehicle. They also carried the Dragunov self-loading sniper rifle), which is only used by the Russian military. In 2022, Kremlin propaganda had the goal of preparing world public opinion for the invasion of Ukraine. In March 2022, Russians said they had found evidence at the decommissioned Chernobyl nuclear power plant that Ukraine was working on a nuclear bomb. Experts scoffed at the claim, which they said was both impossible with the fuel there and not how anyone would run a secret weapons program.

====== Malaysia Airlines Flight 17 ======
The most fake tweets in a day, or on a single topic, by Russian disinformation agency Internet Research Agency (IRA), followed the shooting down of the Malaysian MH17 airliner. Russia took extensive measures and gave many narratives to hide its involvement. In the three days after the crash, the Russian Internet Research Agency posted 111,486 tweets from fake accounts, mostly in Russian. At first they said that Russian-backed rebels downed a Ukrainian plane; later tweets said Ukraine had shot the airliner down. RT quoted a Twitter account purportedly of an air traffic controller named Carlos who said he had seen Ukrainian fighter jets following the airliner. Supposedly, Ukraine mistook the airliner for the Russian presidential jet.

In August 2015, Komsomoloskaya Pravda published a wiretap transcript of two named CIA operatives planning the MH17 attack, a transcript ridiculed for its poor English that recalled "Google translated Russian phrases read from a script". On 20 December 2017, a report by the Intelligence and Security Committee of the British Parliament specifically emphasized that Russia had waged a massive information war, using intense, multi-channel propaganda to convince the world that Russia did not shoot down the plane.

====== 2022 ======
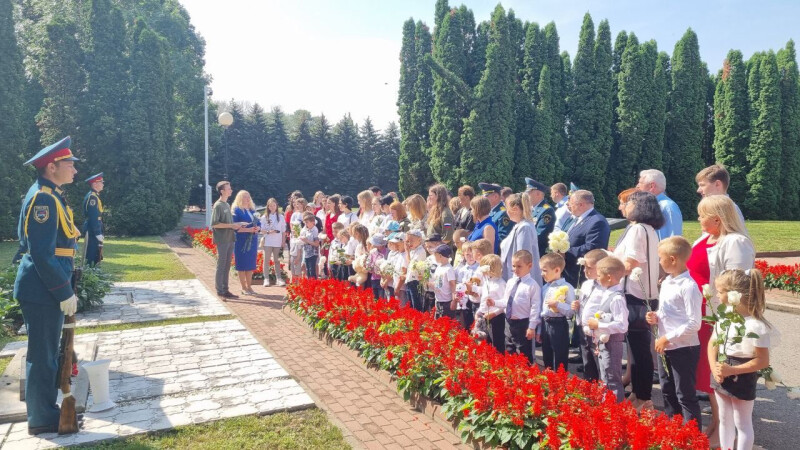
Russian children at a memorial to children allegedly killed by Ukrainian forces in Donbas, a state-sponsored event in Kursk in July 2023

In 2022 Russia insisted it was merely conducting military exercises on the Ukrainian borders, then declared that it needed to protect Russian speakers in eastern Ukraine. Russia also amassed troops at the Ukrainian border with Belarus and held naval exercises in the Black Sea and Sea of Azov that made navigation "virtually impossible" and which Kyiv called "an unjustified complication of international shipping". On 15 February 2022, Russia said it would "partially pull back" from Ukraine's borders, but, according to the US, in fact sent additional troops. "We can't really take the Russians for their word" said Canadian ambassador to the United Nations Bob Rae, after Russia resumed shelling within hours of announcing a ceasefire for civilian evacuation.

After shelling a nuclear power plant complex in Zaporizhzhia during the invasion, the Kremlin said its military seized it "to prevent Ukrainians and neo-Nazis from 'organizing provocations'". On 16 August 2022, Putin claimed that he had "decided to conduct a special military operation in Ukraine in full compliance with the UN Charter." According to Putin, "the objectives of this operation are clearly defined – ensuring the security of Russia and our citizens, protecting the residents of Donbass from genocide." On 21 September 2022, Putin announced a partial mobilisation, following a successful Ukrainian counteroffensive in Kharkiv. In his address to the Russian audience, Putin claimed that the "Policy of intimidation, terror and violence" against the Ukrainian people by the pro-Western "Nazi" regime in Kyiv "has taken on ever more terrible barbaric forms", Ukrainians have been turned into "cannon fodder", and therefore Russia has no choice but to defend "our loved ones in Ukraine."

In October 2022, Russian-American writer and professor Nina Khrushcheva said, alluding to George Orwell's novel 1984, that in "Putin's Russia, war is peace, slavery is freedom, ignorance is strength and illegally annexing a sovereign country’s territory is fighting colonialism." British historian Jade McGlynn wrote that in occupied Ukrainian territories in 2022, after seizing control over mobile internet offices and equipment and installing their own networks, Russian first unrolled propaganda of the same type as in 2014. In the first six months of occupation, the goal of propaganda was to convince Ukrainians living at the occupied territories that the Russian official version of the war is correct and the Ukrainian one is false. This propaganda was of low quality and failed to convince the population. After the initial six months, they switched to a different propaganda mode, in which the war was mentioned as rarely as possible, and the propagandists behaved as if the occupied territories had always been Russian. They instead referred to Ukrainians as occupiers, and to the territories claimed but not controlled by Russia, such as the city of Zaporizhzhia, as "temporarily occupied by Ukrainian militants". This narrative has been consistently advanced by the federal, local, and social media.

==== Tropes ====
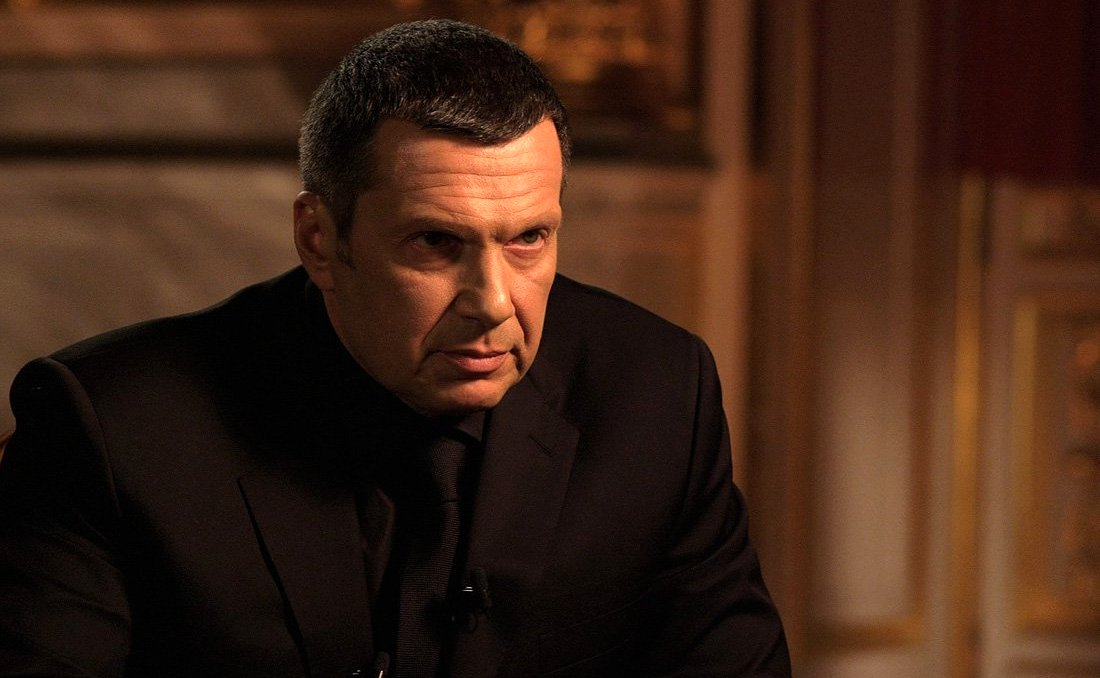
TV and radio host Vladimir Solovyov, described "as a fanatical pro-Putin propagandist", voiced support for his country's 2022 invasion of Ukraine. In 2015, he had publicly claimed that "all of Ukraine is going to be ours".

Since the collapse of the USSR, Russia has circulated propaganda and disinformation to demonize Ukrainians. The need for protection from neo-Nazis plays a recurring role in Russian propaganda, such as justifying the 2022 invasion as a necessary "denazification". In Mariupol, Russians were told in 2022, Ukrainians fired on Russian soldiers despite the cease-fire, and, according to TASS, neo-Nazis were "hiding behind civilians as a human shield."

According to Kacper Rękawek, a postdoctoral fellow with the Center for Research on Extremism at the University of Oslo, simultaneously portraying Ukrainians as fascists and depraved pro-gay liberals, as opposed to the solid conservative values of Russian speakers in eastern Ukraine, has roots in a longstanding narrative, of politicians both in and outside Ukraine, that ties Ukrainian speakers in Western Ukraine to the far-right UPA nationalists who fought against Soviets in World War II. Russia "has an extensive network of allies and front organizations, and reconstructs reality and rewrites history to legitimize itself and undermine others", said a 2018 article in Nature.

In the early 1990s, the first such propaganda tropes presented events with the phrases "after the collapse of the USSR", and "with the collapse of the USSR", to create the impression that these phenomena arose because of the collapse of the USSR, and not the reverse. Propaganda tried to portray Ukraine as economically and politically bankrupt as a state. In 2009, Russia accused Ukraine of "stealing Russian gas".

Ukrainian figures have been quoted making allegedly provocative statements. A criminal case was brought against the leader of the Ukrainian Right Sector, Dmytro Yarosh, for supposedly publishing an appeal to Dokka Umarov to carry out terrorist attacks in the Russian Federation. A day later, authorities announced that the "appeal" had been the work of hackers. In the same way as Russian propaganda sought to portray its swift victory as inevitable against incompetent Ukrainian commanders, Russian media also sought to create fear by propagating stereotypes of the savagery of its own Chechen fighters.

==== Social media ====
In 2022, Russian government groups posed as independent news entities and created fake personas on Facebook, Instagram, Twitter, YouTube, and Telegram, as well as on the Russian-language social media sites Odnoklassniki and V Kontakte, to disseminate Russian narratives, such as the alleged helplessness of Ukrainians and videos of their fighters surrendering. According to The Washington Post, in 2014 the Russian military intelligence service (GRU) created more than 30 pseudo-Ukrainian groups and social media accounts, as well as 25 "leading English-language" publications. Posing as ordinary Ukrainians, intelligence operatives concocted news and disseminated comments to turn pro-Russian citizens against anti-Russian protesters. In early 2016, Ukrainian journalists discovered a network of dozens of social media groups, run from Moscow on multiple social media, that used nationalist rhetoric to undermine the Ukrainian government and mobilize pro-Russian protesters.

===== Access to social media =====
- In October 2017, MSNBC reported that Russian information warfare operatives "reported" the Facebook posts of Ukrainian activists, baselessly claiming that they were pornography or another regulated type of message.
- On 14 July 2014, Facebook blocked the page "Book of Memory of the Fallen for Ukraine", after warning that the content of some messages "violate(d) Facebook standards". They were primarily messages about the death of Ukrainian soldiers from the Special Operations Detachment (OZSP) "Azov", of the Popular Resistance of Ukraine (NSU).
- On 5 March 2022, Russia blocked access to Facebook and Twitter, in response to the latter two companies' freezing and banning of Russian state-owned media. A few days later Russia announced it would block access to Instagram.

===== Attempts to censor Russian Wikipedia =====
Ever since the early 2010s, Russian Wikipedia and its editors have experienced numerous and increasing threats of nationwide blocks and country-wide enforcement of blacklisting by the Russian government, as well as several attempts at Internet censorship, propaganda, and disinformation, more recently during the 2014 Russo-Ukrainian war in the Donbas region and the 2022 Russo-Ukrainian War. In February and March 2022, the first week after the Russian invasion of Ukraine and breakout of the Russo-Ukrainian War, Russian Wikipedia editors warned their readers and fellow editors of several reiterated attempts by the Putin-led Russian government at political censorship, Internet propaganda, disinformation, attacks, and disruptive editing of an article listing Russian military casualties as well as Ukrainian civilians and children due to the ongoing war.

On 11 March 2022, the Belarusian political police (GUBOPiK) arrested one of the most active users of Russian Wikipedia, Mark Bernstein, for the "spread of anti-Russian materials", violating the "fake news" law, after his being doxxed on Telegram. In April–July 2022, the Russian authorities put several Wikipedia articles on their list of forbidden sites, and then ordered search engines to mark Wikipedia as a violator of Russian laws.

== Timeline ==
=== 2014 ===
During and before its annexation of Crimea and encroachment into Donetsk and Luhansk with astroturf rebellions, Russia demonized Ukrainians in the eyes of the Russian and international communities.

==== January ====
- 21 January – Protesters received text messages saying that they were "registered as a participant in the mass disturbances". Cell service providers denied sending the messages, but two of them were owned by Russian companies. Experts suggested state actor involvement.

==== February ====
- Protests in Ukraine and deposition of President Yanukovych
  - Overthrow of Ukrainian President Viktor Yanukovych, who elected to accept Russian foreign aid rather than join the EU, and violent protests broke out. Yanukovich fled Kyiv. The Ukrainian Parliament decided that he had abdicated and removed him from office.
  - Yanukovych called the vote a coup.
  - Russian foreign minister Sergey Lavrov said that "illegal extremist groups" had taken control in Kyiv. This and similar language frequently recurred in the ensuing years.
  - Parliament appointed Alexander Turchinov acting president, pending an election scheduled for May.
  - On 19 February the Russian Ministry of Foreign Affairs referred to Euromaidan revolution as a "Brown revolution" and Euromaidan protesters as "rampant thugs".
- 20 February – Russians enter Crimea
  - According to Russian media, Euromaidan supporters brutalized a bus convoy of anti-Maidan activists on the night of 20–21 February 2014, in Korsun-Shevchenkivskyi, Cherkasy Oblast, burned several buses, and killed seven passengers. On 3 April 2014, occupation forces in Crimea said seven people had died and 30 had gone missing. Amnesty International, Human Rights Watch, and the local police force all questioned the accuracy of this account. However, Putin said this story was the reason for the military operation in Crimea, and the alleged killings of anti-Maidan activists near Korsun were later reflected in the Russian pseudo-documentary Crimea. The Way Home.
  - On 27 February Russian soldiers seize the Crimean Parliament.
  - Sergey Aksyonov installed.
  - Putin gives multiple versions of Russian participation.
  - Donetsk People's Republic separatist Igor Girkin said in January 2015 that Crimean members of parliament were held at gunpoint, and forced to support the invasion and annexation of Crimea.

==== March ====
- On 2 March, Russian media reported that Ukrainian saboteurs shot at a crowd and at the House of Trade Unions near the Crimean Cabinet in Simferopol. The masked saboteurs were armed with modern Russian weapons, including the latest GM-94 grenade launcher, and the "victims" of the attack were unharmed.
- On 18 March, Russia formally annexed Crimea.
- On 19 March, Russian media reported the arrest of a 17-year-old Lviv sniper in Simferopol the day before, who had killed AFU serviceman Sergei Kokurin and a Russian mercenary. No further information about the 17-year-old sniper was given, but Russian commander Igor Girkin later admitted that his unit was responsible.
- On 24 March, several media outlets reported that the deputy commander of the Kerch Marine Battalion, Nikiforov Alexey Vladimirovich, had written a statement about joining the Russian army. However, he went to the mainland and studied at a Ukrainian military university.

==== April ====
- The Donetsk People's Republic and Luhansk People's Republic secede.
- Oleg Bakhtiyarov is arrested in a plot to storm Ukraine's parliament and Kyiv Cabinet of Ministers building. He had recruited some 200 people, paid them each $500 to help, and stockpiled petrol bombs and tools. Bakhtiyarov arranged for Russian TV channels to film the incident, then blame it on Ukrainian radicals.
- On 12 April 2014, former Russian military officer Igor Girkin took Sloviansk in the Donbas.
- Vitaliy Yarema said that Russian Special Forces units, including the 45th Parachute Guards Regiment from Moscow, were operating in Kramatorsk and Sloviansk. On 16 April 450 Russian special forces troops were said to be there.
- On 27 April, Russian media aired a story about "EU concentration camps in Ukraine". Construction began at the site in 2012, under pro-Kremlin Viktor Yanukovych, as an EU-funded project to detain illegal migrants.
- On 29 April, the Russian news agency TASS described a brutal attack by a pro-Russian mob on a peaceful Ukrainian march in Donetsk as "[Ukrainian] radicals [attacking] thousands of anti-fascist marchers".

==== May ====
- Russia's Channel One falsely claimed that Ukrainian soldiers tortured and crucified a three-year-old child.
- On 25 May, Petro Poroshenko (a Ukrainian oligarch) won the 2014 Ukrainian presidential election. During the election campaign on 7 May, a television commercial surfaced that was created in the autumn of 2013 for a Russian Defense Ministry recruitment campaign. The video was criticized for promoting war and the account that had posted it was removed from Vimeo. (It is now only posted on YouTube).

==== June ====
- In the Summer of 2014, Ukraine's Azov brigade helped retake Mariupol.
- In June 2014, after the capture of Nadezhda Savchenko, Russian TV channels NTV and Channel 5 aired a misleading sound bite, during a LifeNewd interview with Nastya Stanko, from a Ukrainian soldier named Volodymyr Kosolap, an Aidar Battalion fighter from Shchastia. Russian media presented him as a "punisher" from a barricading detachment, ordered to shoot anyone who did not want to kill members of pro-Russian armed groups. In the full video of 16 June 2014, Kosolap said that he would have shot any Aidar fighter who tried this. LifeNews took this sound byte out of context.

==== July–August ====
- On 15 July 2014, the English-language Russian broadcaster Voice of Russia published an article in which pro-Russian militants attributed the killing of Pentecostals in Slovyansk to "Ukrainian nationalists", twisting the words of Anton Gerashchenko, then a government spokesperson. The killings have since been attributed to Donetsk separatists.
- In late July to early August 2014, a video of Bohdan Butkevich of Tyzhden was widely publicized, which had Butkevich allegedly calling for the killing of 1.5 million Donbas residents. The video was a rough snippet which completely distorted the meaning of what he said.
- In August 2014, the Ukrainian government blocked 14 Russian TV channels to stop them from spreading war propaganda.
- In August 2014, captured Russian special forces from the 331st regiment of the 98th Svirsk airborne division said they had crossed the border by accident. Ukrainian spokesman Andriy Lysenko said: "This wasn't a mistake, but a special mission they were carrying out."
- In August 2014, the Ukrainian government banned a number of Russian news outlets for broadcasting war propaganda.

==== October ====
- In October 2014, Russia's Pravda and Izvestia accused the Ukrainian Right Sector of terrorizing the Jewish community of Odesa and beating more than 20 people. Mikhail Maiman, quoted by Izvestia, was fictional, and there had not been a single incident of violence.
- On 24 October, CyberBerkut claimed to hack the electronic vote counting system at Ukraine's Central Election Commission (CEC) website
- On 28 October, the Russian intelligence and security services were behind a plot to create a people's republic in Odesa, said Ukraine's SBU, which also said it had found a munitions cache and arrested the alleged separatists.

==== December ====
- In December 2014, the Ukrainian Ministry of Information was created in order to counteract "Russian propaganda". Reporters Without Borders said that "In a democratic society, the media should not be regulated by the government."

=== 2015 ===
==== January ====
- On 28 January, on the outskirts of Khartsyzk, east of Donetsk, the OSCE observed "five T-72 tanks facing east, and immediately after, another column of four T-72 tanks moving east on the same road which was accompanied by four unmarked URAL-type military trucks", as well as intensified movement of unmarked military trucks, covered with canvas.
- In January, after the shelling of residential areas in Mariupol, NATO's Jens Stoltenberg said: "Russian troops in eastern Ukraine are supporting these offensive operations with command and control systems, air defence systems with advanced surface-to-air missiles, unmanned aerial systems, advanced multiple rocket launcher systems, and electronic warfare systems."

==== February ====
- On 9 February, an artillery shell caused an explosion at a chemical plant in Donetsk.
- On 12 February, the Minsk II accords were signed.
- On 15 February, the Minsk II ceasefire took effect.
- On 16 February, the Minister of Foreign Affairs of Ukraine Pavlo Klimkin said that pro-Russian forces had fired on Ukrainians over 100 times in the past day. Separatists accused Ukrainians of violating the ceasefire.
- On 17 February, rebels conquered most of Debaltseve and encircled 10,000 Ukrainian troops in the area. Rebels claimed that the town was not protected by the recently established ceasefire.

==== March ====
- On 23 March 2015, Russian outlets broadcast a news story about a 10-year-old girl allegedly killed by Ukrainian shelling in the Petrovsky district of Donetsk. BBC correspondent Natalia Antelava discovered in Donetsk that the story was Russian propaganda. She asked Russian media employees about the girl's death, and they replied that "she is not here anymore" and that no one had been killed. When asked about the news stories they answered that the stories had been "forced".

==== June ====
- On 22 June, the European Union extended sanctions against Russia because of its actions in Crimea and eastern Ukraine. The Kremlin called the sanctions "unfounded and illegal".

=== 2016 ===
- The Oxford Dictionaries named the term "post-truth" the word of the year.
- On 12 December 2016, the press centre of the Special Operations Forces of Ukraine reported that unauthorized information resources appeared with symbols and photographic materials of the Special Operations Forces of the Armed Forces of Ukraine that might provide distorted or unverified information.
- On 13 December 2016, Russian media preliminarily accused Ukraine of gas theft.
- On 22 December 2016, the American cybersecurity company CrowdStrike released a report, according to which Russian hackers from the Fancy Bear group monitored the location of Ukrainian D-30 howitzers through an Android application written by Ukrainian gunner Yaroslav.

=== 2017 ===
- In May, President Poroshenko blocked access in Ukraine to Russian servers for VKontakte, Odnoklassniki, Yandex and Mail.ru, claiming they were participating in an information war against Ukraine.
- In July, Putin signed a bill, which took effect on 1 November 2017, that banned software and websites meant to circumvent internet filtering in Russia, including anonymizers and virtual private network (VPN) services.

=== 2018 ===
- EU Commissioner for Security Sir Julian King said that prior to the Kerch Strait incident Russia had spread rumours:
  - that the Ukrainians were dredging the Sea of Azov to prepare it for a NATO fleet;
  - that Ukraine planned to infect the Black Sea with cholera;
  - that it planned to blow up the Crimean Bridge with a nuclear bomb.

=== 2019 ===
- In April, Volodymyr Zelenskyy was elected president of Ukraine.

=== 2021 ===
- On 11 May, Viktor Medvedchuk and fellow Opposition Platform — For Life lawmaker Taras Kozak were named suspects for high treason and illegal exploitation of natural resources in Ukraine's Russian-annexed Crimea.
- On 13 May, Viktor Medvedchuk was put under house arrest and fitted with an electronic tracking device.
- In May, Russian authorities began liquidating the Russian company Novye Proekty, which allegedly was used by Medvedchuk for his alleged illegal exploitations in Crimea. In 2021, Poroshenko was named as a co-suspect in the criminal case against Medvedchuk.
- In November, President Zelenskyy accused Rinat Akhmetov of helping Russia to stage a coup in Ukraine. Akhmetov called the allegations "an absolute lie". Zelenskyy later said the plot had tried to enlist Akhmetov but without success.
- In December, Mythos Labs found 697 online accounts tweeting Russian disinformation about Ukraine, versus 58 in November. The number of Ukraine-related tweets by these accounts soared 3,270% from September to December.

=== 2022 ===
==== January ====
- On 6 January, assets of former-president Poroshenko were frozen as part of Ukrainian proceedings against him for high treason.
- On 22 January, the United Kingdom announced that it had intelligence of a planned Russian coup in Ukraine.

==== February ====
- "Russian-backed forces are already shelling targets in the east, as Moscow's propaganda organs blame the violence on the Ukrainian government."
- On 3 February, pro-Russian Ukrainian TV channel NewsOne was banned by presidential decree.
- On 18 February, the Donetsk People's Republic and the Luhansk People's Republic, the separatist areas of eastern Ukraine involved in the war in Donbas, broadcast an urgent appeal for citizens to evacuate to Russia. Investigation showed that the messages were pre-recorded.
- On 21 February, United States president Joe Biden warned of an impending invasion of Ukraine.
- On 28 February, Google turns off live traffic updates for Ukraine out of safety concerns for users.

==== March ====
- In March, the Azov Battalion is fighting Russian invaders in Mariupol.
- On 1 March, Russians explode a vacuum bomb at a Ukrainian army base in the northeastern town of Okhtyrka, killing 70 soldiers.
- On 4 March, Russia blocks access to the BBC and the Voice of America from within Russia, as well as Deutsche Welle and Radio Free Europe.
- On 9 March, A maternity hospital in Mariupol was attacked Four people died. Russian forces deny this event happened. Twitter removed a tweet by the Russian embassy in London to this effect, calling it disinformation.
- On 9–22 March, bombs were defused in Chernihiv, according to Ukrainians, who released images of what appears to be 500lb FAB-500s.
- On 13 March, Russians shelled Chernihiv.
- On 14 March, Marina Ovsyannikova, an editor for Channel One Russia, interrupted the state television channel's live news broadcast to protest against the Russian invasion of Ukraine, carrying a poster stating, in a mix of Russian and English: "Stop the war, don't believe the propaganda, here you are being lied to."
- On 16 March, the Donetsk Academic Regional Drama Theater, in Mariupol, was bombed from the air and largely destroyed. TASS said the Mariupol theater was blown up by the Azov Battalion
- On 16 March, Russian spokesman Igor Konashenkov denied that Russian forces had killed 10 civilians queuing for bread, calling footage of the event a "hoax launched by the Ukrainian Security Service"; "No Russian soldiers are or have been in Chernihiv. All units are outside of the Chernihiv city limits, blocking roads, and are not conducting any offensive action", he said.
- On 16 March, two adults and three children were killed as the result of Russian shelling in Chernihiv.
- On 16 March, Colonel-general Mikhail Mizintsev said Moscow would "turn to international organizations" because, he said, Ukraine was holding Ukrainians hostage in Kyiv, Kharkiv, Chernihiv, and Sumy rather than allowing them to travel to the Russian Federation.
- On 17 March, Russia's ambassador to the United Nations denied bombing a theatre in Mariupol that had been serving as a bomb shelter.
- On 17 March, Russian's Pravda erroneously stated that three members of the Tennessee National Guard, all relatives, had been killed while fighting as mercenaries in Ukraine. The guardsmen had been home for more than a year.
- On 21 March, Ukrainian media reported a deadly missile strike on Kyiv's Retroville Shopping Mall. Russian media released drone footage allegedly showing an multiple rocket launcher system (MLRS) stationed near the mall.

== Staged videos ==
- On 22 July 2015, the head investigator of the Luhansk Prosecutor General's Office, Leonid Tkachenko, said that a warehouse of American weapons had been discovered during the excavation of debris near Luhansk airport. The video allegedly showed army boxes and an American Stinger MANPADS. Analysis of the video found that the "Stinger" was a poorly built prop made of welded plumbing pipes. The markings on it came from the video game Battlefield 3, including the identification number and the errors in the English. The fake was distributed by Russian media, in particular Komsomolskaya Pravda, RIA Novosti, and TV-Zvezda.
- On 18 January 2016, on the eve of the Dutch referendum on the EU-Ukraine Association Agreement, Russian sources circulated a video of Azov Battalion fighters allegedly burning the flag of the Netherlands and threatening to commit terrorist acts there if the agreement was not approved. The Dutch investigative journalism group Bellingcat concluded that the video was a forgery and had been distributed if not created by the Kremlin-linked Internet Research Agency in St Petersburg.
- Another video released by the Donetsk People's Republic (DNR) and CyberBerkut had links to the IRA. The Defense Intelligence Agency considers Cyberberkut a front for the Kremlin's internet activities, and the Kremlin maintained plausible deniability as to the activities of the IRA by bankrolling it through Yevgeny Prigozhin, known as "Putin's chef". It accused Ukraine's Azov Battalion of fighting alongside ISIS militants. The photos and videos were made by pro-Russian militants showed armed men wearing ISIS and Azov symbols firing on industrial buildings. The BBC identified the buildings as hangars at the Isolation mineral wool plant in Donetsk, which in 2011 was converted into an art space known as the Isolation Art Project, and was seized in June 2014 by pro-Russian militants.
- On 23 July 2018, a video, spread through the Russian media, purported to show that a special unit of the Security Service of Ukraine (SBU) attacked a building complex used by Ukrainian volunteers using armoured personnel carriers. The video purported to show the SBU beating the volunteers. The video was exposed as fake as early as 25 July: the SBU uniforms had outdated elements and insignia; the armoured personnel carrier had white identification lines in a form that had not been used for a long time, as well as anti-accumulation grilles, which the SBU does not put on its equipment. The actors who played SBU special forces spoke with a foreign accent, used language that manifested hatred for Bandera members and, unprofessionally, seemed to kick the volunteers. On 11 September, an armoured personnel carrier was filmed in Donetsk. On 20 September, the location of the staged assault was identified — the grounds of the abandoned Reaktiv chemical plant in occupied Donetsk.
- On 16 August 2018, a video of the alleged brutal detention of a person at a Ukrainian checkpoint was published on a YouTube channel with no subscribers or other videos. The video was distributed among the Russian occupation forces, in particular through the Lost Armor website. The Ukrainian mil.in portal published a debunking. The appearances of all Ukrainian checkpoints (Majorca, Marinka, Gnutovo, Stanitsa Luhanskaya, as well as Chengar and Kharkiv) was analyzed, and none of them matched the video. There were few cars and practically no people, which would be untrue of any of the actual checkpoints. License plate numbers were also falsified. The video purported to show a rebel fighter attempting to surrender under the SBU "waiting for you at home" program, which offered amnesty to fighters who returned to a peaceful life. Since the video showed the purported fighter on the ground being kicked, it may have been an attempt to discredit the program and reduce attrition in the rebel forces.
- in March 2022, during the Russian invasion, videos were discovered purporting to show Ukrainian-produced disinformation about strikes inside Ukraine, which were then "debunked" as showing some other event outside Ukraine. However, this may be the first case of a disinformation false-flag operation, as the original, supposedly "Ukraine-produced" disinformation, was never disseminated by anyone, and was in fact preventive disinformation created specifically to be debunked and cause confusion and mitigate the impact on the Russian public of real footage of Russian strikes within Ukraine, when it eventually got past Russian-controlled media. According to Patrick Warren, head of Clemson's Media Forensics Hub, "It's like Russians actually pretending to be Ukrainians spreading disinformation.... The reason that it's so effective is because you don't actually have to convince someone that it's true. It's sufficient to make people uncertain as to what they should trust."
- On 14 March 2022, a video was released purporting to show a helicopter attacking a Russian convoy, resulting in the destruction of military aircraft and tanks. Upon further analysis, the footage was found to have been produced using the Arma 3 video game.
- On 16 March 2022, a one-minute deepfake video aired on the website of the Ukraine 24 television channel. In it, Zelenskyy appeared to tell Ukrainian soldiers to surrender. Ukraine 24 said they had been hacked, but Russian social media boosted it. Zelenskyy immediately disavowed the video and responded with one of his own, and Facebook and YouTube began to remove the fake video. Twitter allowed the video in tweets discussing the fake but said it would be taken down if posted deceptively. Hackers inserted the disinformation into the live scrolling-text news crawl. It was not immediately clear who created the deepfake.

== Results ==
On 23 November 2016, the European Parliament passed a resolution opposing Russian propaganda. Putin responded by calling the work of the Russian news agencies RT and Sputnik effective. On 1 March 2022, YouTube blocked across Europe channels connected to RT and Sputnik, then worldwide on 11 March, due to the channels' insistence that Russia was not waging war in Ukraine. Roku and DirectTV also dropped RT.

== Countermeasures ==
No precise equivalent appears to exist to the systemic Russian disinformation campaign, although Ukraine and other interested parties have used speeches, television appearances, social media, cyber warfare, and viral memes against Russia. Not all of these actions can be attributed with certainty, but the United States has deployed soft power on Ukraine's behalf: at least one self-identified anonymous account has claimed to have damaged Russian infrastructure, and a number of official Ukraine social media accounts have successfully created a favorable narrative. The U.S. government, suspecting a buildup to a false-flag attack, released its intelligence findings about Russian troop movements before the invasion began, undermining the posited plans to blame the attack on Ukraine; "the U.S. government was very forthcoming...there wasn't an information vacuum that the Russians could step in and fill", explained researcher Laura Edelson.

Ukraine has created a narrative of Ukrainian bravery and indomitability. Peter W. Singer, a strategist and senior fellow at New America, a think tank in Washington said: "If Ukraine had no messages of the righteousness of its cause, the popularity of its cause, the valor of its heroes, the suffering of its populace, then it would lose... Not just the information war, but it would lose the overall war." On 5 April 2022, Russian opposition politician Alexei Navalny said, the "monstrosity of lies" in the Russian state media "is unimaginable. And, unfortunately, so is its persuasiveness for those without access to alternative information." He tweeted that "warmongers" among Russian state media personalities "should be treated as war criminals. From the editors-in-chief to the talk show hosts to the news editors, [they] should be sanctioned now and tried someday."

=== Zelenskyy ===
Zelenskyy's speeches have repeatedly gone viral and galvanized the Ukrainian population. The New Statesman wrote that Zelenskyy was "made to play" the part of the "underdog taking on the monster", which is "one of the oldest narratives of all." Wearing a green military t-shirt, he passionately appealed for help for his people in fiery virtual speeches to the parliaments of Canada, the United Kingdom, and the European Union, as well as a joint session of the U.S. Congress, to a standing ovation each time. He has spoken to the Russian people directly, in Russian, his first language. Also in Russian, he positioned himself on 3 March as a "neighbor" and an "ordinary guy", needling Putin for recently receiving his visitors at an extraordinarily long table: "Come sit with me! Just not 30 meters away like with Macron and Scholz.... I'm your neighbor ... What are you afraid of?"

Putin's previous shirtless photo-ops sought to position him as a strong and virile leader. Images of the younger Zelenskyy wearing body armor and drinking tea with Ukrainian soldiers starkly contrasted with news broadcasts of Putin in rococo surroundings and very socially distanced. The body armor photo was taken in 2021, and he actually drank tea with the soldiers a few days before the invasion began, but the images were real if out of context, and the pictures of Putin at an enormously long table, apparently for fear of COVID-19, were also real. In March 2022, citing Singer, Sarah Sicard wrote that "Ukrainian media has been particularly savvy in playing up the eleventh hour rise of its president, Volodymyr Zelenskyy, whose line, 'I need ammunition, not a ride', may rival the likes of William Shakespeare's 'cry havoc and let slip the dogs of war' in terms of quotability."

Official Ukrainian social media accounts have sought to bolster support for efforts against the invasion and spread information, with targeted posts and videos used to recruit soldiers and call for international aid. Some media analysts have highlighted the Ukrainian officials' methods as beneficial. Several academics, including Professors Rob Danish and Timothy Naftali, have highlighted Zelenskyy's speaking ability and use of social media to spread information and draw upon feelings of shame and concern while building kinship with viewers. Real-time information about the invasion has been spread by online activists, journalists, politicians, and members of the general population, both in and out of Ukraine. Official communications of Ukrainian authorities, in particular, during the preparation of the announced 2023 offensive, were confusing, presumably intentionally, to prevent Russia from having access to information. A former Danish intelligence officer, Jacob Funk Kirkegaard, while interviewed in May 2023, opined that "every public announcement from Ukraine should be viewed as essentially misinformation".

=== Memes ===
A 25 February 2022, video of an elderly woman scolding a Russian soldier appears to record an actual event in Henichesk. She gave him sunflower seeds so sunflowers would grow when he died. The wildly popular social media legend, Ghost of Kyiv, "a Ukrainian fighter pilot who shot down six Russian planes cannot be confirmed", said Deutsche Welle on 1 March. The story was tweeted by the official Ukraine account and authenticated by former Ukrainian President Petro Poroshenko, but the photo of the pilot posted by Poroshenko turned out to be three years old. The story's verity has been questioned by both Russian and Western media. The Ukrainian military has not verified it, for one thing, and some of the images were definitely repurposed from elsewhere. But on 25 February, the Ministry of Defence of Ukraine suggested that "The Ghost of Kyiv" might be a returning reserve pilot; so, they did not deny it either.

The defiant response of a Ukrainian border guard stationed at Zmiinyi (Snake Island) began a Ukrainian framing of the war as David versus Goliath, which the videos of Ukrainian farmers towing off abandoned Russian tanks have helped to continue. Some Ukrainians say that the many memes that have circulated since the war began have helped them to cope with their uncertain future by making them laugh. Citizen contributions can also serve the more serious purpose of combating disinformation, says Daniel Johnson, a Roy H. Park Fellow at UNC Hussman's School of Journalism and former U.S. Army journalist. "It's hard to lie when I have 150 videos showing that you're not in Kyiv and you're not winning", he said.

== See also ==
- Economy of the Soviet Union
- Firehose of falsehood
- Media portrayal of the Russo-Ukrainian War
- Russian military deception
- Russian disinformation since 2000
- Russian web brigades
- Russians in Ukraine
- Dzhokhar Dudayev Battalion
- Russo-Ukrainian cyberwarfare
- International sanctions during the Russo-Ukrainian War (2014)
- Russia–Ukraine relations
- Russo-Ukrainian War
- Television in Ukraine
- Timeline of the 2014 pro-Russian unrest in Ukraine
- War crimes in the 2022 Russian invasion of Ukraine
- 2014 Russian sabotage activities in Ukraine
- Russian allegations of fascism against Ukraine
- Vulkan files leak

== Bibliography ==
- A. Bondarenko, N. Kelm, R. Kulchynsky, N. Romanenko, J. Tymoschuk (А. Бондаренко, Н. Кельм, Р. Кульчинський, Н. Романенко, Я. Тимощук,), У нас погані новини (We have bad news) // Texty.org.ua, 28 November 2018 (in Ukrainian)
- Petro Bukovsky (Петро Бурковський), Як «Страна.ua» зображає Україну агресором // Детектор медіа, (How Strana.ua portrays Ukraine as an aggressor) // Media Detector, 4 July 2018 (in Ukrainian)
- Georgy Chizhov, Pro-Kremlin influence in the Ukrainian media (in English) // The Kremlin's influence quarterly - Free Russia Foundation, 2020
- Olena Churanova (Олена Чуранова), Копіпаст російської пропаганди в українських новинах // Детектор медіа, (Copypaste of Russian propaganda in Ukrainian news) // Media Detector, 17 October 2018 (in Ukrainian)
- Gai-Nyzhnyk PP, Росія проти України (1990—2016): від політики шантажу і примусу до війни на поглинання та спроби знищення (Russia v. Ukraine (1990–2016): from the policy of blackmail and coercion to the war of takeover and attempts at destruction). МП Леся (MP Lesya), 2017. 332pp. ISBN 978-617-7530-02-1 (in Ukrainian)
- Roman Hardel (оман Хардель), Википедия как инструмент влияния на историческое сознание в контексте русско-украинской информационной войны // Sdirect24, (Wikipedia as a tool for influencing historical consciousness in the context of the Russian-Ukrainian information war) (in Russian) // Sdirect24, 2 March 2019
- Volodymyr Ivakhnenko (Володимир Івахненко), «Задача — посеять сомнения». Почему Украина обвиняет Россию во лжи // Радіо свобода, ("The task is to sow doubts": Why Ukraine accuses Russia of lying) // Radio Liberty, 18 December 2018 (in Russian)
- Konakh VK (Конах В. К.), Сучасні тенденції в захисті національних медіапросторів від російської пропаганди (Modern tendencies in protection of national media spaces from Russian propaganda) // Strategic priorities. (Стратегічні пріоритети). National Institute for Strategic Studies (Національний інститут стратегічних досліджень), 2016, v.38. ISSN 2306-5664
- Kurban OV (Курбан О. В.), Інформаційне супроводження російської гібридної агресії в Донбасі (2014—2016) (Information support of Russian hybrid aggression in Donbass (2014–2016)) // Nauk. Journal "Library Science. Documentation. Informology." 2017, No. 2. S. 66–73
- Lazorenko OA, Інформаційний складник гібридної війни Російської Федерації проти України: тенденції розвитку (Information component of the hybrid war of the Russian Federation against Ukraine: development trends). Strategic priorities (Стратегічні пріоритети). National Institute for Strategic Studies (Національний інститут стратегічних досліджень), 2015. Vol. 36. No.3, 2015. ISSN 2306-5664. (In Ukrainian)
- Фейки об Украине: о чем российские издания лгали в 2017 году // Крим.Реалії, (Fakes about Ukraine: what Russian publications lied about in 2017) (in Russian) // Krym.Realii, 2 January 2018
- G. Pocheptsov, Г. Почепцов «Сучасні інформаційні війни». Видавничий дім «Києво-Могилянська Академія». 2015 ("Modern Information Wars"). Kyiv-Mohyla Academy Publishing House. 2015 (in Ukrainian)
- Прокремлівські ЗМІ про Україну та інтерпретація ними фашизму (огляд дезінформації) // Радіо свобода (Pro-Kremlin media about Ukraine and their interpretation of fascism (review of misinformation)) // Radio Liberty, 24 July 2017 (in Ukrainian)
- Andriy Soshnikov (Андрій Сошніков), За зламом пошти Бабченка стояли люди з «ДНР», які знімали фейки про бойовиків «ІД» // BBC, (Behind the hacking of Babchenko's mail were people from the DNR, who filmed fakes about IS militants) // 4 October 2018 (in Ukrainian)
- Tkach VF (Ткач В. Ф.), Спецпропаганда як інформаційний складник гібридної війни Росії проти України (Special propaganda as an information component of Russia's hybrid war against Ukraine) // Strategic Priorities (Стратегічні пріоритети). National Institute for Strategic Studies (Національний інститут стратегічних досліджень), 2016. Vol. 38. ISSN 2306-5664 (in Ukrainian)
- Zolotukhin D. Yu. Біла книга спеціальних інформаційних операцій проти України 2014 – 2018 (White book of special information operations against Ukraine 2014–2018). 2018. 384pp. ISBN 978-966-97732-2-7 (in Ukrainian)

=== In English ===
- Jolanta Darczewska, (19 May 2015). The devil is in the details. Information warfare in the light of Russia's military doctrine. Point of View. Ośrodek Studiów Oriental. ISBN 978-83-62936-57-1
- Jolanta Darczewska, (22 May 2014). The anatomy of Russian information warfare. The Crimean operation, a case study. Point of View. Ośrodek Studiów Oriental. ISBN 978-83-62936-45-8
- David Frum, The Great Russian Disinformation Campaign // The Atlantic, 1 July 2018
- Keir Gilles. Handbook of Russian Information Warfare. Fellowship Monograph 9. NATO Defense College. ISBN 978-88-96898-16-1
- Alexei Minakov, Top 10 fakes of Russian propaganda for 2017 // InformNapalm, 5 January 2018
- Ellen Nakashima, Inside a Russian disinformation campaign in Ukraine in 2014 (in English)(переклад) // Washington Post, 25 December 2017
- Christopher Paul, Miriam Matthews, (2016). The Russian "Firehose of Falsehood" Propaganda Model. Perspectives. RAND Corporation. P.16. doi: 10.7249/PE198.
- Bret Perry, Non-Linear Warfare in Ukraine: The Critical Role of Information Operations and Special Operations (English) // Small Wars Journal, 14 August 2015
- Peter Pomerantsev, Michael Weiss, (22 October 2014). The Menace of Unreality: How the Kremlin Weaponizes Information, Culture and Money. Institute of Modern Russia. p. 44.
- Katri Pynnöniemi, András Rácz, ed. (10 May 2015). Fog of Falsehood. Russian Strategy of Deception and the Conflict in Ukraine. FIIA Report 45. The Finnish Institute of International Affairs. ISBN 978-951-769-486-5. ISSN 2323-5454. Archive of the original on 22 June 2016. Cited 6 December 2016.
- András Rácz, (16 June 2015). Russia's Hybrid War in Ukraine: Breaking the Enemy's Ability to Resist. FIIA Report 43. The Finnish Institute of International Affairs. ISBN 978-951-769-453-7. ISSN 2323-5454. Archive of the original on 22 December 2016. Cited 6 December 2016.
- Maria Snegovaya, (2015). Putin's information warfare in Ukraine. Soviet origins of Russia's hybrid warfare. Russia Report 1. Institute for the Study of War.
- Andriy Soshnikov, Inside a pro-Russia propaganda machine in Ukraine BBC, 13 November 2017
- Aric Toler, Непостійні, взаємно-суперечливі історії Кремля щодо MH-17 // Bellingcat, (The Kremlin's Volatile, Contradictory MH-17 Stories) // Bellingcat, 5 January 2018 (in English)
- Tetyana Voropaeva (Тетяна Воропаєва), Информационная безопасность как фактор укрепления обороноспособности украины // (Information Security as a Factor of Strengthening Ukraine's Defense Capabilities) (in Russian) // gisap.eu
- Mariia Zhdanova, University of Glasgow and Dariya Orlova, European Journalism Observatory. Computational Propaganda in Ukraine: Caught Between External Threats and Internal Challenges. Working Paper. 2017.9. Project on Computational Propaganda
- Dmitry Zolotukhin (Дмитро Золотухін), Біла книга спеціальних інформаційних операцій проти України 2014 – 2018 (Kremlin Fakes: Why Mr. Putin Links ISIS to Ukraine?) (in English) (Russian) // 25 May 2018 (in English)
- Committee on Foreign Relations, (2018). Putin's asymmetric assault on democracy in Russia and Europe: Implications for US national security. US Government Publishing Office.
- Russian Social Media Influence. Understanding Russian Propaganda in Eastern Europe. Research Reports. RAND Corporation. 2018. pp. 148. ISBN 9780833099570. doi: 10.7249/RR2237. RR-2237-OSD.
