= Vladimir Lefebvre =

Russian mathematical psychologist (1936–2020)

Vladimir Alexandrovich Lefebvre (Влади́мир Алекса́ндрович Лефе́вр, 22 September 1936 in Leningrad, USSR – 9 April 2020) was a mathematical psychologist at the University of California, Irvine. With his wife, V. I. Dubovskaya, Lefebvre left USSR for USA in 1974. He created equations to predict the large-scale consequences of individual actions. Among the parameters in the equations are the self image of the individual and the action as perceived via this self-image. The result is a number expressing the probability that the individual in question will perform a specific action.

Lefebvre's mathematical approach to social psychology is often referred to as reflexive theory - presumably due to the 'reflexive' nature of taking into account subjects' self-image(s). Lefebvre developed Reflexive Theory as a military researcher in the former Soviet Union, where he was born and educated prior to coming to the United States. According to Jonathan Farley, a mathematician at Stanford doing applied work on national security issues, Lefebvre's Reflexive Theory was a Soviet alternative to game theory which had been widely adopted by the American defense establishment.

Lefebvre created a mathematical theory of ethical cognition. This theory uses a three level structure: the person, the person’ perception and the person’s perception of their communication partner. This theory was used in negotiations by the governments of the US and the Soviet Union during the break-up of the Soviet Union.
