= New generation warfare =

Russian theory of unconventional warfare

New generation warfare (NGW; Russian: Война нового поколения, romanized: Voyna novogo pokoleniya) is a Russian theory of unconventional warfare which prioritizes the psychological and people-centered aspects over traditional military concerns, and emphasizes a phased approach of non-military influence such that armed conflict, if it arises, is much less costly in human or economic terms for the aggressor than it otherwise would be. It was first enunciated in 2013 by Valery Gerasimov as part of his Gerasimov Doctrine.

Numerous analysts cite the 2014 Russian annexation of Crimea and war in Donbas as specific examples that followed the guidelines of new generation warfare.

According to one analyst, "the Russian view of modern warfare is based on the idea that the main battlespace is the mind and, as a result, new-generation wars are to be dominated by information and psychological warfare, ... morally and psychologically depressing the enemy’s armed forces personnel and civil population. The main objective is to reduce the necessity for deploying hard military power to the minimum necessary."

== Terminology ==
The term new generation warfare was first introduced in Russian (Война нового поколения) in 2013, as synonyms for grey zone and hybrid warfare in the Gerasimov doctrine. These are all terms that refer to modern military theories of warfare that go beyond conventional warfare. The terms began to spread and take on various meanings, and were not always used with clarity. Some analysts use them more or less interchangeably, while others identify differences among them.

In his 2009 paper, Frank Hoffman noted the rising use of the term hybrid threat, and analyzed the multiple meanings of the term. Hoffman pointed out that there had been resistance among some analysts for the new term, who preferred older concepts of "conventional" and "irregular" warfare, while Hoffman believed that the older terms were insufficient to describe conflicts in the modern world. He defined hybrid threat as an adversary that "simultaneously and adaptively employs a fused mix of conventional weapons, irregular tactics, terrorism and criminal behavior in the battle space to obtain their political objectives".

Since being introduced, the term hybrid warfare has become trendy and is used often in debates on modern warfare. The term has gone through various stages of evolution of its meaning, and has been criticized for being overused. The term is used in official doctrines of nations, and permeates academic and policy discussions. The meaning has been extended to non-state actors, and shifted to be synonymous with "malign Russian activities" under Vladimir Putin. At first, the term was not used in Russia, but has recently been adopted and undergone its own shifting usage: before the Russo-Ukrainian war it tended to refer to trends in American military thinking, but after 2014 Russia views hybrid warfare as entirely emanating from the West, in that every conflict anywhere in the world, from hot wars to sports to vaccination to the Eurovision song contest are all aspects of "hybrid warfare" waged against them by the West. The West on the other hand views it more as a way of preventing subversion and interference from Russia, including cyberwarfare.

Russia created the concept of new generation warfare, but has also absorbed the hybrid warfare term. According to Suchkov (2021), the difference for Russian analysts is that new generation warfare is outward-facing, i.e., it's about "how to pro-actively engage with foreign adversaries", whereas hybrid warfare is about how to defend against interference from the West.

== Background ==
The Cold War was a period of geopolitical tension between the United States and the Soviet Union and their respective allies, the Western Bloc and the Eastern Bloc, which began following the end of World War II and lasted until the dissolution of the Soviet Union in 1991. A period of openness under the last Soviet leader Mikhail Gorbachev and the first post-Soviet one Boris Yeltsin ended with the 1999 accession to power of Vladimir Putin, who took a harder line and sought to reestablish Russia as a world power with a sphere of influence including the former Soviet republics.

=== Cold War ===
The Soviet Union was one of the Allied powers of World War II fighting on the same side as the United States to defeat the Nazis. After victory over Hitler in 1945, the Allies disagreed on what the map of Europe should look like and where the borders would be drawn. The Soviets effectively occupied Central and Eastern Europe, while US and Western allied forces remained in Western Europe. The Soviet Union sought to establish a sphere of influence and dominate the internal affairs of countries in its border regions. Soviet-style regimes arose in the Eastern Bloc.

The US government pursued an increasingly hard line against the Soviets, and prime minister Winston Churchill delivered his famous "Iron Curtain" speech in Fulton, Missouri and called for an Anglo-American alliance against the Soviets. Stalin dismissed the accusation that the USSR was exerting increasing control over the countries in its sphere. He argued that there was nothing surprising in "the fact that the Soviet Union, anxious for its future safety, [was] trying to see to it that governments loyal in their attitude to the Soviet Union should exist in these countries".

Forty years of simmering tensions, rearmament, and proxy wars followed between the two nuclear-armed nations, and their allies. The western bloc created NATO to protect western Europe and contain the Soviets, and the Soviets created the Warsaw Pact in response, uniting eastern European countries behind the Iron Curtain. Direct armed conflict between the two nuclear-armed superpowers was avoided (sometimes only barely), such as during the Berlin Crisis of 1961 and the Cuban Missile Crisis. In the 1960s, the United States became bogged down in the "quagmire" of Vietnam in an attempt to contain Communism; twenty years later the Russians were bogged down in Afghanistan; each superpower left an Asian war without a victory. Conflicts multiplied in Third World nations, including in Latin America, Indonesia, Israel, South Asia, and Africa. After a period of détente in the 1970s, tensions were reawakened in the 1980s and US president Ronald Reagan "went all out to fight the second cold war". Pope John Paul II provided a moral focus for anti-communism; a visit to his native Poland in 1979 stimulated a religious and nationalist resurgence centered on the Solidarity movement that galvanized the opposition, which was met by a harsh crackdown in 1981.

=== Thaw and end of the Cold War ===
Massive spending in the Soviet Union on the arms race exacerbated already deep-seated structural problems in the Soviet system, In response to the massive buildup on the Soviet side, US presidents Carter and Reagan built up the US military, culminating with the Strategic Defense Initiative ("Star Wars"), which the Soviets were not able to respond to. By 1985, when Mikhail Gorbachev became General Secretary, the Soviet economy was stagnant. Gorbachev announced economic reforms called perestroika, or restructuring. and glasnost ("openness") which increased freedom of the press and the transparency of state institutions. This contributed to the accelerating détente between the two nations, resulting in agreements which led to a scaling-back of the arms race. Tensions subsided; the START I arms control treaty was signed, Soviet forces withdrew from Afghanistan, and the Berlin Wall came down in 1989.

On 3 December 1989, Gorbachev and Bush declared the Cold War over at the Malta Summit. By 1990, Gorbachev consented to German reunification, and later that year the two former rivals were partners in the Gulf War against Iraq.

=== Dissolution of the Soviet Union ===
In 1989, the Soviet alliance system was on the brink of collapse and communist leaders of the Warsaw Pact states were losing power. The Pan-European Picnic in August 1989 in Hungary became a test of how far the Soviet leader Gorbachev was willing to go with glasnost. Thousands of holiday-makers exited Hungary at the border with Austria without interference by Hungarian border guards, and the Soviet Union did nothing to stop it. The dam broke, and tens of thousands of East Germans crossed into Austria. The Hungarian borders were opened on 11 September, and the Berlin Wall fell on 9 November. The 1989 revolutionary wave swept across Central and Eastern Europe and peacefully overthrew all of the Soviet-style east-European states; Romania was the only Eastern-bloc country to topple its communist regime violently. The Warsaw Pact disintegrated in 1991.

Greater political and social freedoms in the Soviet Union instituted by the last Soviet leader Mikhail Gorbachev created an atmosphere of open criticism. The Soviet Union finally collapsed in 1991 when Boris Yeltsin seized power in the aftermath of a failed coup that had attempted to topple reform-minded Gorbachev. The Baltic States seceded, and Ukraine and Belarus were recognized as independent on 8 December. The Soviet flag was lowered at the Kremlin for the last time on 25 December 1991, replaced by the Russian tricolor. The successor state was headed by Yeltsin until 1999.

=== Putin era ===
Since 1999 Vladimir Putin has headed Russia either as president or Prime Minister. The economy has improved, but he has also been widely accused of corruption, authoritarian leadership, and widespread human rights abuses.

== Precursors ==
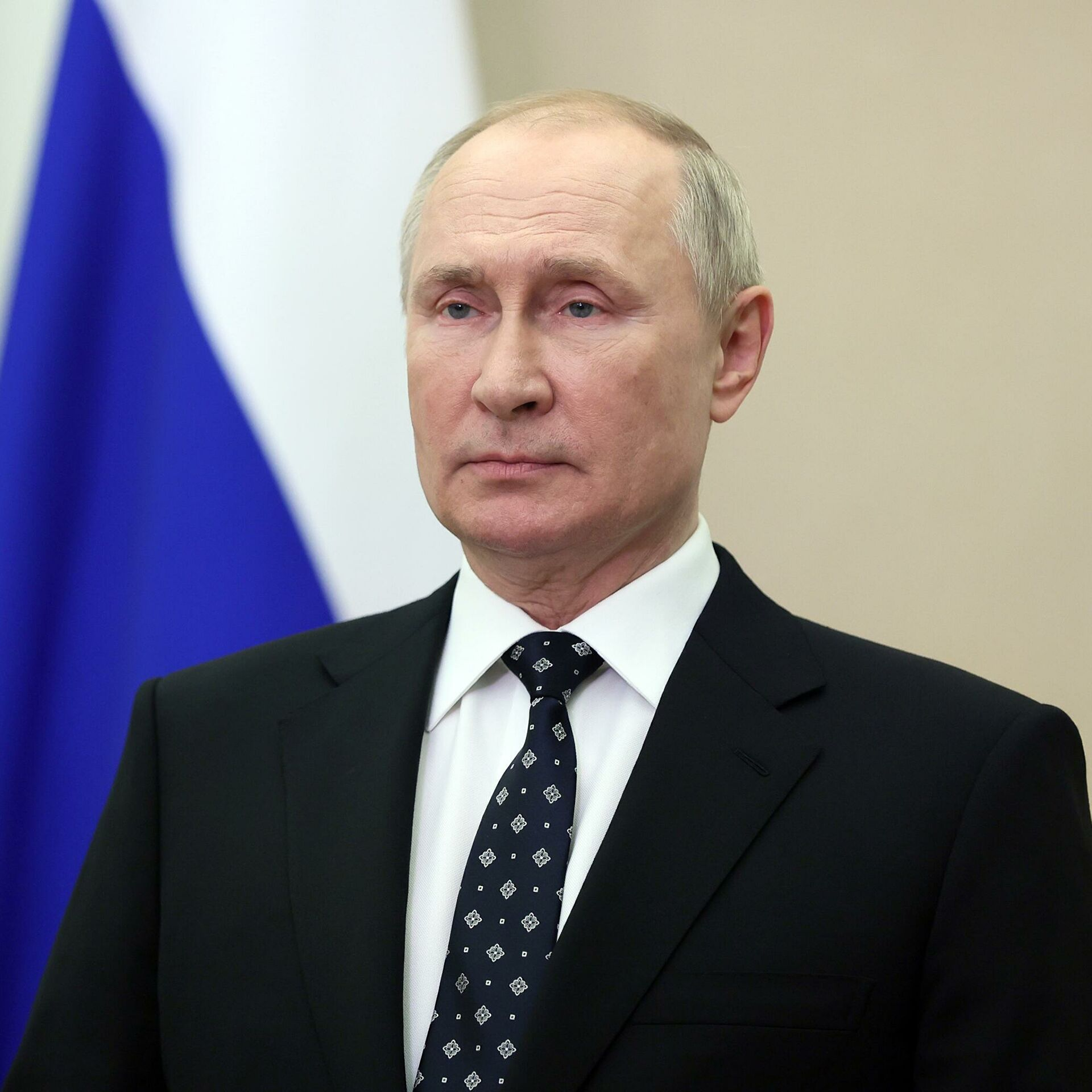
Vladimir Putin in November 2021

Phillip Karber at the National Geospatial-Intelligence Agency identified 1999 when former KGB agent Vladimir Putin came to power in Russia as a "pivotal turning point in European security". Putin has stated that "the collapse of the Soviet Union was the greatest geopolitical catastrophe of the century." Ever since, Putin has labored to reestablish Russia as a world power and dominance in Eastern Europe, and pushed to restructure the armed forces, and introduced new tactics in the 2000 Second Chechen War.

The Russian Army General Staff redesigned the Russian Army for decentralized operations including the possibility of unconventional operations, conventional weapons, and tactical nuclear environments, in order to face different kinds of threats from the high-tech West, massed armies in the east, and unconventional threats from the south. This was used in 2008 in the Georgian conflict, and practiced in field simulations against NATO, through 2013.

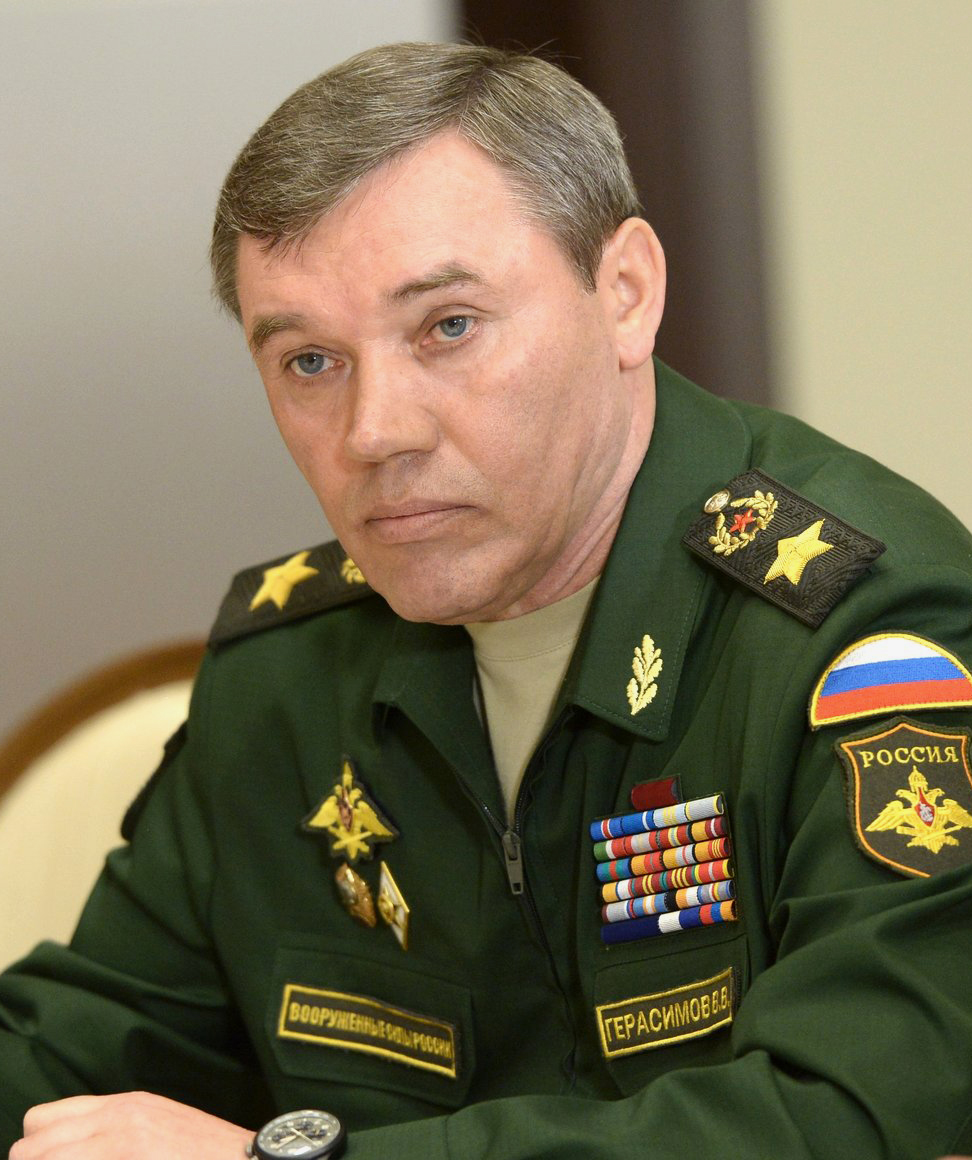
Gerasimov in 2015

It was also in 2013 that publications by Russian military writers about "new generation warfare" became available, and Chief of the General Staff General Valery Gerasimov called for "rethinking on the forms and methods of warfare." Many analysts consider the Gerasimov doctrine the best description of Russia's modern strategy of total warfare, which uses politics as well as war, and attacks on multiple fronts at once including hackers, business, media, disinformation, as well as military means. The internet has made available the possibility of new tools and approaches to destabilize or influence foreign actors, and the Gerasimov doctrine describes a framework for using them, and says that they are not just adjuncts of military force, but are in fact, the primary or preferred means to victory. The strategy is to foment chaos within an enemy state, and develop permanent unrest and conflict there. West Point analyst John Chambers uses the terms Gerasimov doctrine and new generation warfare synonymously. Chambers views the Gerasimov/new generation warfare doctrine as having been formulated specifically to exploit the weaknesses of large enemy bureaucracies such as the United States.

The Gerasimov doctrine is a foreign policy doctrine named after a February 2013 publication of an article by Valery Gerasimov, Russian chief of the General Staff, which laid out a new theory of modern warfare combining old Soviet tactics and strategic military thinking about total war which was based more on societal aspects than traditional military ones. Gerasimov wrote:

The very 'rules of war' have changed. The role of nonmilitary means of achieving political and strategic goals has grown, and, in many cases, they have exceeded the power of force of weapons in their effectiveness. … All this is supplemented by military means of a concealed character.

The prime example of the use of the Gerasimov doctrine in the field, is the 2014 unrest in Ukraine, where Russia supported extremists on both sides to exacerbate tensions and create unrest, and then used the unrest as a pretext to take over Crimea.

== Gerasimov doctrine ==
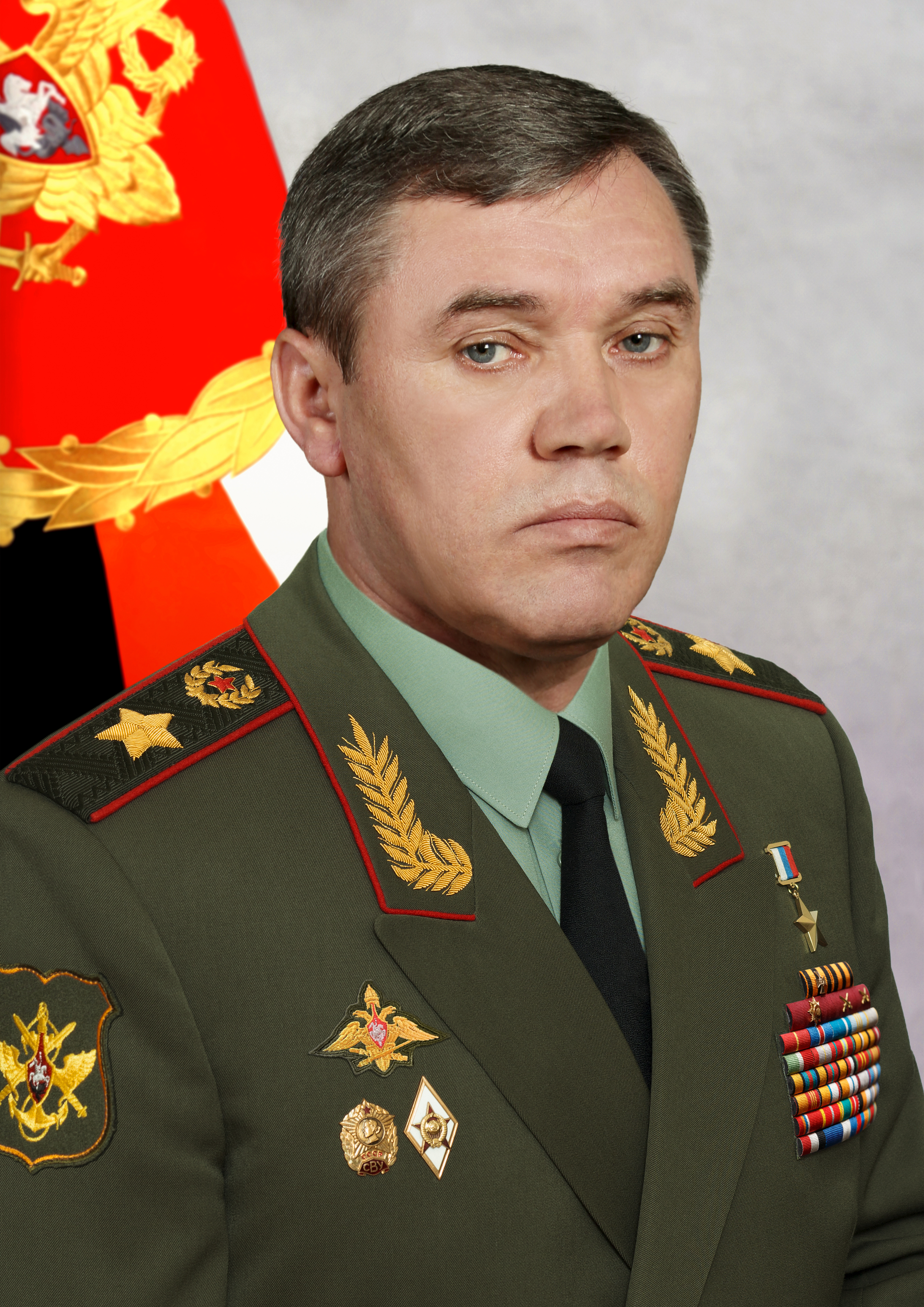
General Valery Gerasimov, Chief of the General Staff of the Russian Armed Forces

The Gerasimov Doctrine, named after Valery Gerasimov, the Chief of the General Staff of the Russian Armed Forces, is a hypothesized military doctrine of hybrid warfare used by Russia. The doctrine puts interstate conflict and warfare on par with political, economic, informational, humanitarian, and other non-military activities.

After the Russian invasion and annexation of Crimea, Mark Galeotti coined the term in his annotation and discussion of an article on doctrine written by Gerasimov before the invasion. Some Western analysts wrote that the Russian invasion reflected the "Gerasimov Doctrine", helping make the term a buzzword. However, other researchers, including Galeotti, say the "Gerasimov Doctrine" does not exist as a distinct doctrine from New Generation Warfare, or that Gerasimov's discussion of doctrine was not a statement of policy. At least one researcher said Gerasimov was stating his views on American doctrine rather than stating Russian doctrine, and that Gerasimov was using his article to ask the scientists of the Russian Academy of Military Science to do research to help him to understand the new ways of Western warfare.

=== Origin ===
The term Gerasimov Doctrine was coined by Mark Galeotti in his blog "In Moscow's Shadows" while discussing an article Gerasimov published in the Military-Industrial Courier (Russian: Voenno-Promyshlennyi Kurier) called "The Value of Science in Foresight" (Russian: Tsennost' nauki v predvidenii') in the edition of 27 February–5 March 2013. Galeotti later regretted coining the term.

One researcher says Gerasimov’s article was the draft of his annual speech to the Russian Academy of Military Science in March 2013, and expressed his views on American doctrine. This article was reprinted in the English-language magazine Military Review, and subsequently quoted many times in the Western press.

=== Gerasimov's views on future warfare ===
The doctrine calls for a 4:1 ratio of non-military (i.e politics, information, intelligence, economics (4) to military (1) components. Gerasimov emphasizes "the importance of controlling the information space and the real-time coordination of all aspects of a campaign, in addition to the use of targeted strikes deep in enemy territory and the destruction of critical civilian as well as military infrastructure." He also proposes to cloak regular military units in "the disguise of peacekeeper or crisis-management forces."

==== Military action ====
- Military measures of strategic deterrence
- Strategic deployment
- Warfare
- Peacekeeping operations

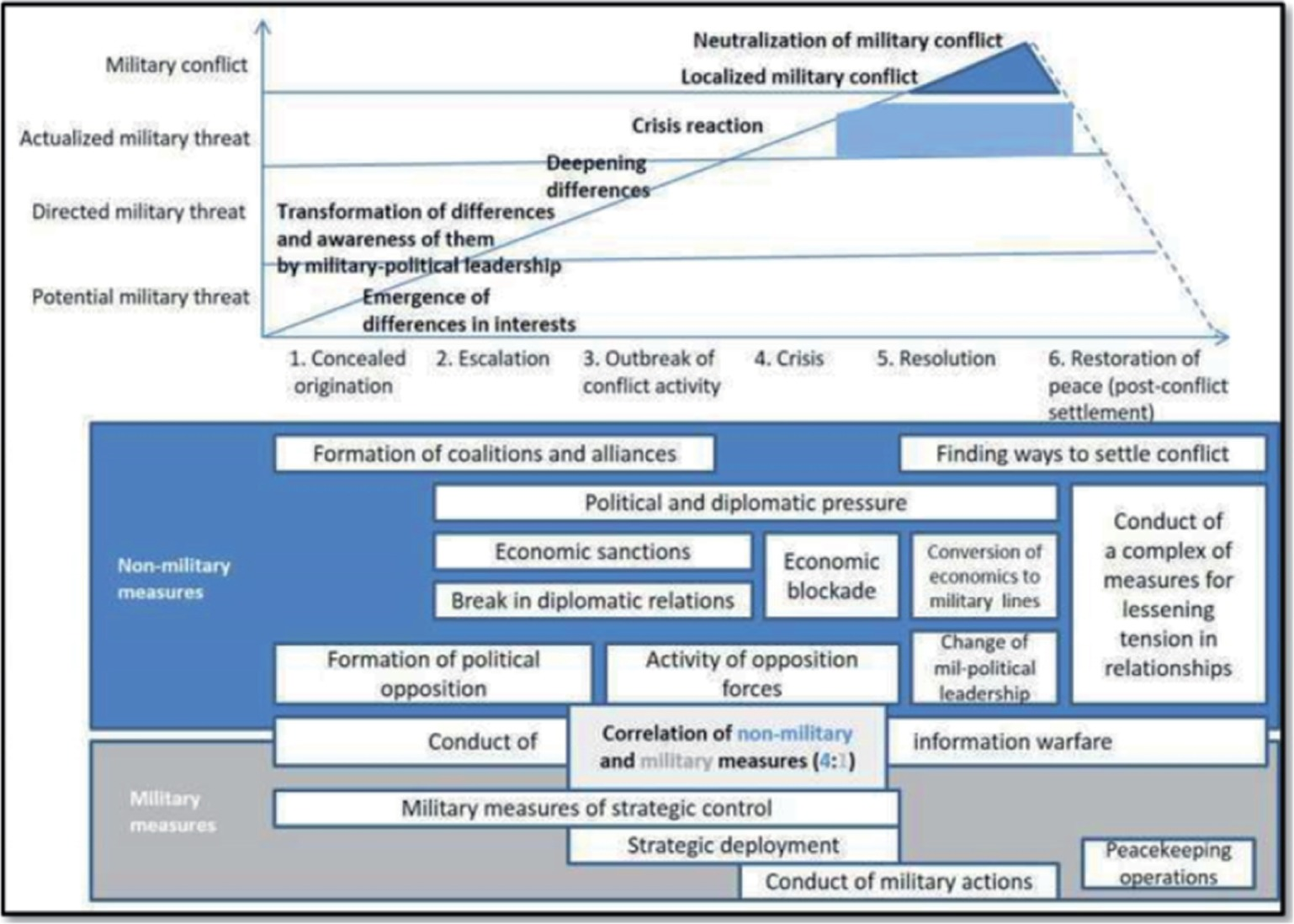
Stages and processes of hybrid warfare

==== Non-military actions ====
- Formation of coalitions and alliances
- Political and diplomatic pressure
- Economic sanctions
- Economic blockade
- Breakdown of diplomatic relations
- Formation of political opposition
- Action of opposition forces
- Conversion of the economy of the country confronting Russia to the military rails
- Finding ways to resolve the conflict
- Changing the political leadership of the country confronting Russia
- Implementation of a set of measures to reduce tensions in relations after the change of political leadership

In addition, the doctrine assumes "information confrontation," without specifying whether these activities are military or non-military.

==== Interpretation of the doctrine by some Western experts ====
According to some experts, its key elements are based on the historical roots of Russia's previous military doctrine and show a striking similarity to the provisions of China's "Unrestricted Warfare" doctrine, published in 1999. It is believed that this doctrine can be seen as a reinterpretation in the realities of the 21st century of the well-known concept of unconventional warfare, which in modern Russian military terminology are called "nonlinear".

Within this framework, the main goal of "nonlinear warfare" is to achieve the desired strategic and geopolitical results, using a wide toolbox of non-military methods and means: explicit and covert diplomacy, economic pressure, winning the sympathy of the local population, etc.

According to the U.S. military, the "Gerasimov Doctrine" represents the most complete embodiment of the latest achievements of Russian military thought in a new type of warfare, which demonstrates the unprecedented integration of all capabilities of national influence to achieve strategic advantages. Based on the discreteness of the idea of war, which was established in Russian culture by Leo Tolstoy's classic novel War and Peace, the Gerasimov Doctrine has blurred the lines between the polarised states of "war" and "peace," introducing a kind of analog to the Western idea of an intermediate continuum or grey-zone. U.S. analysts point out that the Russian military's use of the new developments surprisingly inverts some of the fundamental paradigms of armed confrontation that were laid down in the works of Carl von Clausewitz and have been considered immutable for centuries.

For example, Clausewitz's description of war as a "continuation of politics, but by other means" no longer applies in the "Gerasimov Doctrine" because it does not consider war as a continuation of politics, but politics as a continuation of war, emphasising that the effective conduct of politics may involve a broader arsenal of non-military means and methods. Similarly, the Gerasimov Doctrine forces a reconsideration of several other important tenets, such as Clausewitz's military-theoretical understanding of the "centre of gravity" as a key point of effort.

Some Western experts appear to have been concerned by the apparent focus of the Russian "Gerasimov Doctrine" on exploiting the weak links of the Western principle of managerial decision making, which is based on a system of checks and balances that implies exhaustive analysis of the situation, lengthy public discussion, and extensive coordination of the efforts of various agencies (the State Department, the Department of Defense, etc.).

In contrast, by relying upon the Russian model of governance, which according to some experts served as a partial basis for the Gerasimov Doctrine, Gerasimov was said to have aimed to seamlessly combine all the authoritative institutions, making coordination between them completely unencumbered. Their functioning is allegedly hidden from the outside observer by an impenetrable veil of secrecy, and the available tools use the applied achievements of reflexive control, which theoretically would allow the Russian authorities to act rigidly, flexibly, and quickly, and not be particularly distracted by such conventions as legality, legitimacy, etc..

=== Application of the doctrine ===
Given the release date of the Gerasimov report and Russia's subsequent actions, many experts are inclined to link these events and directly point to Russia's use of the doctrine against Ukraine and the U.S.

=== Criticism ===
The majority of Russian experts believe that Gerasimov did not present anything new, and doubt the existence of such a doctrine.

In his blog, Jānis Bērziņš, former director and senior researcher with the National Defence Academy of Latvia, and nonresident researcher with the Swedish Defence University, pointed that Gerasimov's presentation and later publication in the VPK only reflected the main points some military thinkers, notably the Russian military thinkers Chekinov and Bogdanov, have been doing for years. Bērziņš additionally noted that Gerasimov’s main point was that he expects military science to help military leaders to think about practical problems of war, since he seems to be worried about Russia’s lack of strategy to defend itself against what he called “hybrid threats.”

Michael Kofman, Research Program Director in the Russia Studies Program at CNA and as a Fellow at the Kennan Institute, Woodrow Wilson International Center in Washington, DC, agrees that Mark Galeotti invented the term and that it does not exist in Russian military thinking. He stressed that Gerasimov's speech "reflected general sentiments in Russian military thought on how the U.S. conducts political warfare via “color revolutions,” eventually backed by the employment of high precision weapons, with many of the observations derived from the Arab Spring. That article represented the Russian military interpretation (or more correctly misinterpretation) of the U.S. approach to conducting regime change, combined with a bureaucratic argument designed to link the budget of the Russian Armed Forces, consuming trillions of rubles each year, to an external challenge defined largely as political."

In 2016, Roger McDermott pointed out in Parameters journal that Gerasimov deliberately ignores the factors that conceptually unite the various wars and armed conflicts, emphasising that each has its own history and unique path of development. As McDermott writes, the denial in the context of Gerasimov's ideas of a generalising model that could be perceived as a holistic doctrine is more than compensated for by the meanings attributed to his statements by Western specialists. According to McDermott, myths about the emergence of Russia's latest and deadliest hybrid warfare doctrine are one of the most dangerous aspects of the confrontation between Russia and NATO.

== Key aspects ==
Previous military strategies focused on traditional military concerns such as logistics, strength and location of enemy forces, whereas new generation warfare identifies the battleground as the mind of the civilian public. One analyst wrote:

Thus, the Russian view of modern warfare is based on the idea that the main battlespace is the mind and, as a result, new-generation wars are to be dominated by information and psychological warfare, in order to achieve superiority in troops and weapons control, morally and psychologically depressing the enemy’s armed forces personnel and civil population."

Characterizing this emphasis on the mind, Berzins describes the theory as prioritizing "influence over destruction; inner decay over annihilation; and culture over weapons or technology", and is a "total war battlespace" that includes "political, economic, informational, technological, and ecological" aspects. The goal is to implement the theory via eight phases, starting long before there is any military conflict. "Phase Zero" is about preparing the terrain by implementing psychological, informational, and other measures that prevent conflict.

Chambers views New generation warfare as designed to use grey-zone hybrid threats, and "is focused on using non-military means of achieving political and strategic goals as well as military means 'of concealed character' to include the open use of forces 'often under the guise of peacekeeping and crisis regulation' to accomplish objectives. These tactics and techniques are particularly effective against the United States in the gray zone due to laws and regulations affecting our ability to act in Phase 0."

=== Strategic communication ===
In New generation warfare, communications and the media are used to uphold a narrative aimed both at the international community as well as at a domestic audience, using the language of law to evade the usual deterrence and whip up support at home for operations they characterize as legal uses of force to support "protection and self-defense of Russian nationals" living in Donbas and Crimea, and an invitation for intervention by local leaders there who have been the object of years of softening up by the Russians in the preparatory phases. On the surface, Russia appears or claims to be acting in support of self-defense and sovereignty, as supported by Article 51 of the UN Charter, and supported by acts of the Russian parliament. New generation warfare seeks to take the acts themselves out of the realm of military action, such that it's unclear if an armed attack has, in fact, occurred, confusing their enemy's ability to define the response as a military attack and respond to it as one.

=== Elements ===
Defense and national security expert on Ukraine Phillip Karber identified five elements of New generation warfare:

- political subversion – intelligence agents; agit-prop operations using mass media to exploit internal differences; corruption, bribery and intimidation of local officials; kidnapping, assassination and terrorism; creating local opposition cells from discontented elements
- proxy sanctuary – seizing local government centers of power, airports and military depots; arming and training insurgents; creating checkpoints; destroying ingress transportation infrastructure; cyberattacks; phony referendums; establishment of a "People’s Republic" under Russian domination.
- intervention – deploying Russian forces to the border with large-scale exercises involving ground, naval, and air force troops; clandestine introduction of heavy weapons to insurgents; creation of training and logistics camps adjacent to the border; integrating proxy troops into Russian equipped and led formations.
- coercive deterrence – secret strategic force alerts; deployment of tactical nuclear delivery systems; theater and intercontinental maneuvers; aggressive air patrolling of adjacent areas to limit their freedom of movement.
- negotiated manipulation – use and abuse of Western negotiated ceasefires to regroup and rearm their proxies; using violations as a tactic, while inhibiting other states from helping due to fear of escalation; split the Western alliance by using oil or economic incentives; selective and repetitive phone negotiations that go nowhere.

Chambers compared New generation warfare planning processes with American processes, and identified an eight-phases construct on the Russian side, and six phases on the American side. They don't line up well, and the first four phases of New generation warfare all fall within Phase 0 of US planning, the latter requiring a lot of interagency planning and communication, slowing it down, while the Russian process is designed to be nimble and work within the US phases. As Chambers puts it, "The fundamental problem with countering operations in the gray zone takes place when the United States cannot clearly identify gray-zone actors and actions (ambiguity) nor develop a clear common operating picture of actions taking place. In this case, the United States will be constrained by a bureaucracy that will likely not authorize operations until there is a clear threat. At this point, it is too late and the adversary has already used gray-zone operations to shape the battlefield and achieve its strategic objectives."

== In practice ==
The New generation warfare theory became used in practice in Crimea and Donbas in 2014, in Russia's proxy war with Ukraine. Karber stated that "As practiced in Ukraine, Russia's new generation warfare is manifested in five component elements: political subversion, proxy sanctuary, intervention, coercive deterrence, and negotiated manipulation."

The invasion of Crimea was carried out quietly using the excuse of humanitarian intervention. In just three weeks and with less than 10,000 troops, Russia managed to dislodge Crimea from Ukraine and annex it, without a shot being fired, and the surrender of 190 Ukrainian bases to the Russians. The ground was prepared for this long before, via a multi-pronged "soft" approach including bribing local officials, paying off oligarchs, providing local separatists with intelligence information, investing heavily in local Ukrainian energy and industrial businesses, and the continual emission of pro-Russian propaganda through networks owned or funded by Russia, and a process of deception known as "maskirovka" ("camouflage" in Russian) to hide its operations. It does the same thing domestically, with its vast control of local print media, but especially via television reporting, which is very dominant news source for most of the population of the country.

The strong governmental control over the media gives it a direct pipeline to influence public opinion in the country. Public support of the media is very high, with 88% believing that Europe and the United States are involved in an "information war" to manipulate Russian media, while the Russian government merely reports the facts.

Accompanying Russian aggression on the ground in Ukraine in 2014, Russia made direct nuclear threats against Ukraine, who had earlier given up their nuclear weapons under the 1994 Budapest Agreement in exchange for an explicit guarantees of its sovereignty from Moscow. Russia has continued to push the limits, operating close to NATO borders with dangerous over-flights, demonstrations of nuclear force, and hostile wargame exercises, causing anxiety among border NATO member countries as well as neutral countries.

== Compared to other theories ==
New generation warfare doctrine differs from hybrid warfare in that it combines both low-end, clandestine operations with high-end direct superpower involvement. On the other hand, William Neneth in 2015 wrote of "Russia’s State-centric Hybrid Warfare", while in the same year Balasevicius wrote of "state level hybrid war doctrine". Before May 2015, USAREUR commander Ben Hodges, who was particularly interested in the Russian plan for the "simultaneous employment of multiple instruments of war, including non-military means where information warfare, such as mass political manipulation", had referred to it as "hybrid or multidimensional war". However, in 2016 McDermott opined that hybrid warfare was alien to Russian military theory.

== See also ==
- Accelerated pluralism
- Active measures
- Cabbage tactics
- Conventional warfare
- Corporate warfare
- Cold War II
- Critical infrastructure protection
- Cyberwarfare
- Destabilisation
- Dulles' Plan
- Economic warfare
- European Centre of Excellence for Countering Hybrid Threats
- Fourth-generation warfare
- Grey-zone (international relations)
- Gunboat diplomacy
- Internet manipulation
- Irregular warfare
- Organized crime
- Political warfare
- Proactive cyber defence
- Proxy war
- Psychological warfare
- Russian separatist forces in Donbas
- Russo-Ukrainian War
- Unconventional warfare
- Urban terrain
- Urban warfare

== Works cited ==
- "1989: Malta summit ends Cold War". BBC. 3 December 1989. Archived from the original on 3 October 2018.
- Balasevicius, Tony (2015-11-10). "Russia's "New Generation War" and Its Implications for the Arctic". Mackenzie Institute. The Mackenzie Institute. Archived from the original on 2017-03-20.
- Berzins, Janis (April 2014). Russia's New Generation Warfare in Ukraine: Implications for Latvian Defense Policy (PDF) (Report). National Defence Academy of Latvia Center for Security and Strategic Research. pp. 1–13.
- Blank, S. J. (2015). IMPERIAL AMBITIONS: Russia's Military Buildup. World Affairs, 178(1), . http://www.jstor.org/stable/43555284
- Bowman, Andrew S. (20 August 2020). "Russian Armed Forces: Military Doctrine and Strategy" (PDF). No. IF11625. Congressional Research Service.
- Carliner, Geoffrey; Alesina, Alberto, eds. (1991). Politics and Economics in the Eighties. University of Chicago Press. ISBN 978-0-226-01281-0.
- Chambers, John (2016-10-18). "Countering Gray-Zone Hybrid Threats. An Analysis of Russia's 'New Generation Warfare' and implications for the US Army" (PDF). Modern War Institute at West Point. Archived from the original (PDF) on 2017-03-17.
- Clines, Francis X. (December 26, 1991). "Gorbachev, Last Soviet Leader, Resigns; U.S. Recognizes Republics' Independence". The New York Times. p. A–1.
- Diggins, John P. (2007). Ronald Reagan: Fate, Freedom, And the Making of History. W.W. Norton. ISBN 978-0-393-06022-5.
- Deutsche Welle (19 August 2014). "The picnic that changed European History". DW Akademie.
- Echevarria II, Antulio J. (2015). "How should we think about 'grey-zone' wars?". Infinity Journal. 5 (1). IJ Infinity Group: 16–21. ISSN 2312-5888. Archived from the original on 5 August 2020. "Analysts, practitioners, and scholars alike have struggled to come to terms with such uses, assigning labels such as 'hybrid wars', 'new generation wars', and 'gray-zone' conflicts, among others, to distinguish contemporary practices from those of so-called traditional wars. While the original aim of such labeling or relabeling may have been to draw the attention of busy policymakers to emerging security issues, it has evolved into something of a culture of replication in which the labels are repeated more out of habit than reflection."
- Fedyk, Nicholas (2016). "Russian 'New Generation' Warfare—Theory, Practice, and Lessons for U.S. Strategists". Small Wars Journal. 25 (6): 2–8.
- Gaddis, John Lewis (2005). The Cold War: A New History. Penguin Press. ISBN 978-1-59420-062-5.
- Gaidar, Yegor (2007-04-19). "The Soviet Collapse: Grain and Oil" (PDF). On the Issues: AEI online. American Enterprise Institute.
- Gerasimov, Valery (February 2013). "Ценность науки в предвидении" [The Value of Science in Foresight]. Военно-промышленный курьер [Military-Industrial Courier] (weekly newspaper) (in Russian). 476 (8). Archived from the original on 2017-08-20.
- Gibbs, Joseph (1999). Gorbachev's Glasnost: The Soviet Media in the First Phase of Perestroika. Texas A&M University Press. ISBN 0-89096-892-6.
- "Collapse of the Soviet Union - 1989-1991". GlobalSecurity. 2022. "Above all, we should acknowledge that the collapse of the Soviet Union was a major geopolitical disaster of the century."
- Hoffman, Frank (October 2009). "Hybrid vs. Compound War the Janus Choice". Armed Forces Journal. 147 (3) – via EBSCOhost.
- Karber, Phillip (4 June 2015). "Russia's New Generation Warfare". NGA.mil. National Geospatial-Intelligence Agency. Archived from the original on 10 September 2015.
- Karber, Phillip (12 January 2022). "'Putin Is Not Stupid': This Expert Spent 182 Days On The Russia-Ukraine Battlefields". 19FortyFive.
- McCauley, Martin (2008). Origins of the Cold War, 1941–1949. Seminar studies in history (revised 3rd ed.). Harlow, England; New York: Pearson Longman. ISBN 978-1-4058-7433-5. OCLC 191732526.
- McDermott, Roger N. (Spring 2016). "Does Russia Have a Gerasimov Doctrine?" (PDF). Parameters. 46 (1). Archived from the original (PDF) on 2017-02-09.
- McKew, Molly (5 September 2017). "The Gerasimov Doctrine". Politico.
- Neneth, William (17 April 2015). "Russia's State-centric Hybrid Warfare". RKK/ICDS Diplomaatia.
- Newman, William W. (1993). "History Accelerates: The Diplomacy of Co-operation and Fragmentation". In Goodby, James E.; Morel, Benoit (eds.). The Limited Partnership: Building a Russian-US Security Community. Oxford: Oxford University Press. ISBN 978-0-19-829161-9. Archived from the original on 29 July 2020.
- Roht-Arriaza, Naomi (1995). Impunity and human rights in international law and practice. Oxford University Press. ISBN 0-19-508136-6.
- Schmitz, David F. (1999). "Cold War (1945–91): Causes". In Whiteclay Chambers, John (ed.). Cold War (1945–91). The Oxford Companion to American Military History. Oxford University Press. pp. 147–149. ISBN 978-0-19-507198-6. OCLC 769463173.
- Suchkov, Maxim A (2021). "Whose hybrid warfare? How 'the hybrid warfare' concept shapes Russian discourse, military, and political practice". Small Wars & Insurgencies. 32 (3): 415–440. doi:10.1080/09592318.2021.1887434. S2CID 233353066.
- Towle, Philip (2000). "Cold War". In Charles Townshend (ed.). The Oxford History of Modern War. New York: Oxford University Press. ISBN 978-0-19-285373-8.
- Bērziņš, Janis (2020). The Theory and Practice of New Generation Warfare: The Case of Ukraine and Syria, The Journal of Slavic Military Studies, 33:3, 355-380, DOI: 10.1080/13518046.2020.1824109
- Bartles, Charles K. (2016), "Getting Gerasimov Right" (PDF), Military Review, 96 (1): 30–37, archived from the original (PDF) on 13 April 2016
- Chivvis C. "Understanding Russian "Hybrid Warfare". And What Can Be Done About it" RAND Corporation. 2017. — 1 марта.
- Henry Foy. "Valery Gerasimov, the general with a doctrine for Russia" Файненшл Таймс. — 2017. — 1 сентября.
- Hoffman, Frank G; Mattis, James N. "Future Warfare: The Rise of Hybrid Wars Proceedings" United States Naval Institute, 2005. pp 18–19.
- Monaghan, Andrew (1 December 2015), "The 'War' in Russian's 'Hybrid Warfare'", Parameters, 45 (4), US Army War College: 65–74
