= Soviet Information Bureau =

Soviet news agency 1941 to 1961

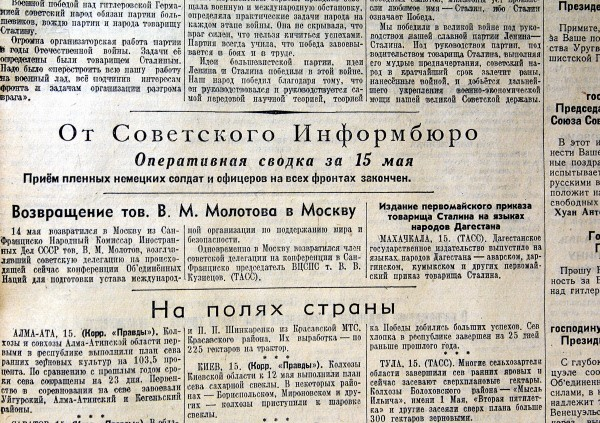
The final Sovinformburo operational summary, 15 May 1945

Soviet Information Bureau (Russian: Советское информационное бюро, romanized: Sovetskoye informatsionnoye byuro), commonly known as Sovinformburo (Совинформбюро) was a leading Soviet news agency, operating under that name from 1941 to 1961 when its name changed to RIA Novosti.

== Operation ==
From the Soviet Information Bureau by Yuri Levitan, announcing the capture of Dresden, 8 May 1945

Operational summary of 30 March 1945, announcing the rout of the Wehrmacht's Army Group Danzig by the Soviet 2nd Belorussian Front.

The Axis invasion of the Soviet Union started on 22 June 1941, opening the Eastern Front of World War II. On 24 June 1941 a directive of Sovnarkom and the Central Committee of the Communist Party of the Soviet Union established the Sovinformburo "to bring into the limelight international events, military developments, and day-to-day life through printed and broadcast media".

During World War II the Sovinformburo directed the activity of the All-Slavic Anti-Fascist Committee, the Anti-Fascist Committee of Soviet Women, the Anti-Fascist Committee of the Soviet Youth, the Anti-Fascist Committee of Soviet Scientists and the Jewish Anti-Fascist Committee (JAC). In 1944 a special bureau on propaganda for foreign countries was set up as part of Sovinformburo. In 1961 the Sovinformburo was transformed into Novosti Press Agency which was succeeded by RIA Novosti in 1991 and, in 2013, by International Information Agency Russia Today.

Yuri Levitan made the radio announcements on Radio Moscow (known for its "Wide is My Motherland" call-sign). While Radio Moscow always started its announcements with the words "Moscow is speaking" (Govorit Moskva), during the Axis aggression against the Soviet Union in World War II broadcasts came from Sverdlovsk (today Yekaterinburg) until 1943, when activity moved to Kuibyshev (present-day Samara) until 1945.

The Soviet Information Bureau never announced the fall of Kiev in 1941.

== Chairmen ==
- Aleksandr Sergeevich Scherbakov (1941–1945)
- Solomon Abramovich Lozovsky (1946–1947)
- Boris Nikolaevich Ponomarev (1947–1961)

== Radio announcers ==
- Yuri Levitan

== See also ==
- Eastern Bloc media and propaganda
- Censorship in the Soviet Union
- Propaganda in the Soviet Union
