= Rossiya Segodnya (disambiguation) =

Rossiya Segodnya is a Russian state-controlled media group.

Rossiya Segodnya (Russian: Россия сегодня; Russia Today) may also refer to:

- RT (TV network), a Russian television network
- Russian Federation Today, a Russian-language magazine

== See also ==
- Russia Today (disambiguation)
