= Svetlana Mironyuk =

Russian manager and media executive (born 1968)

- Светлана Миронюк
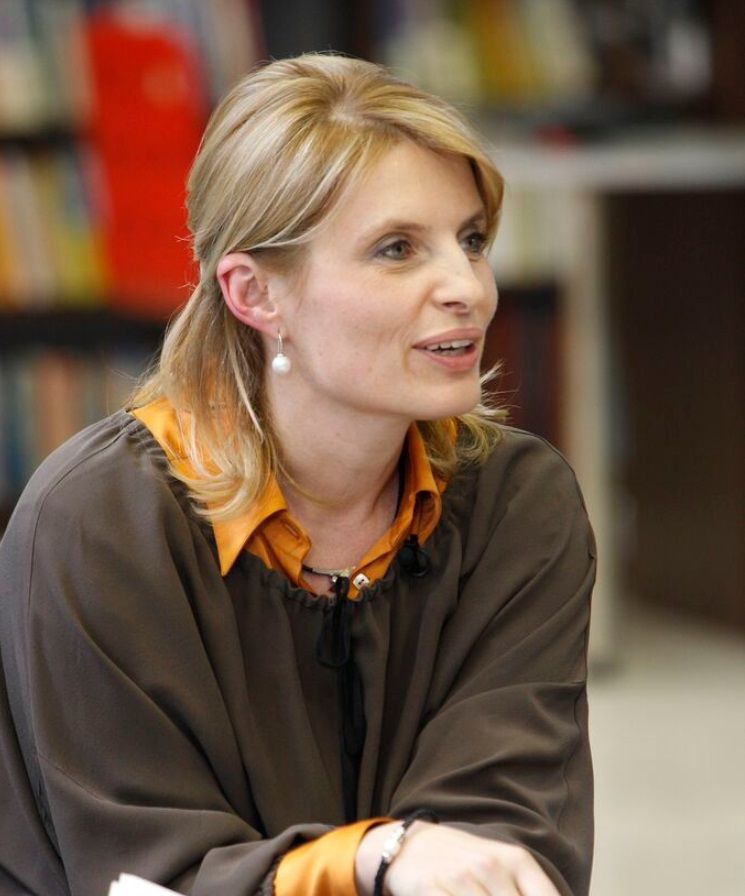
- Mironyuk in 2011
- Born: Svetlana Vasiliyevna Mironyuk; 3 January 1968 (age 58); Moscow, Russian SFSR, Soviet Union
- Education: Moscow State University (1990)
- Occupation: Media executive
- Spouse: S.A. Zverev
- Children: 3

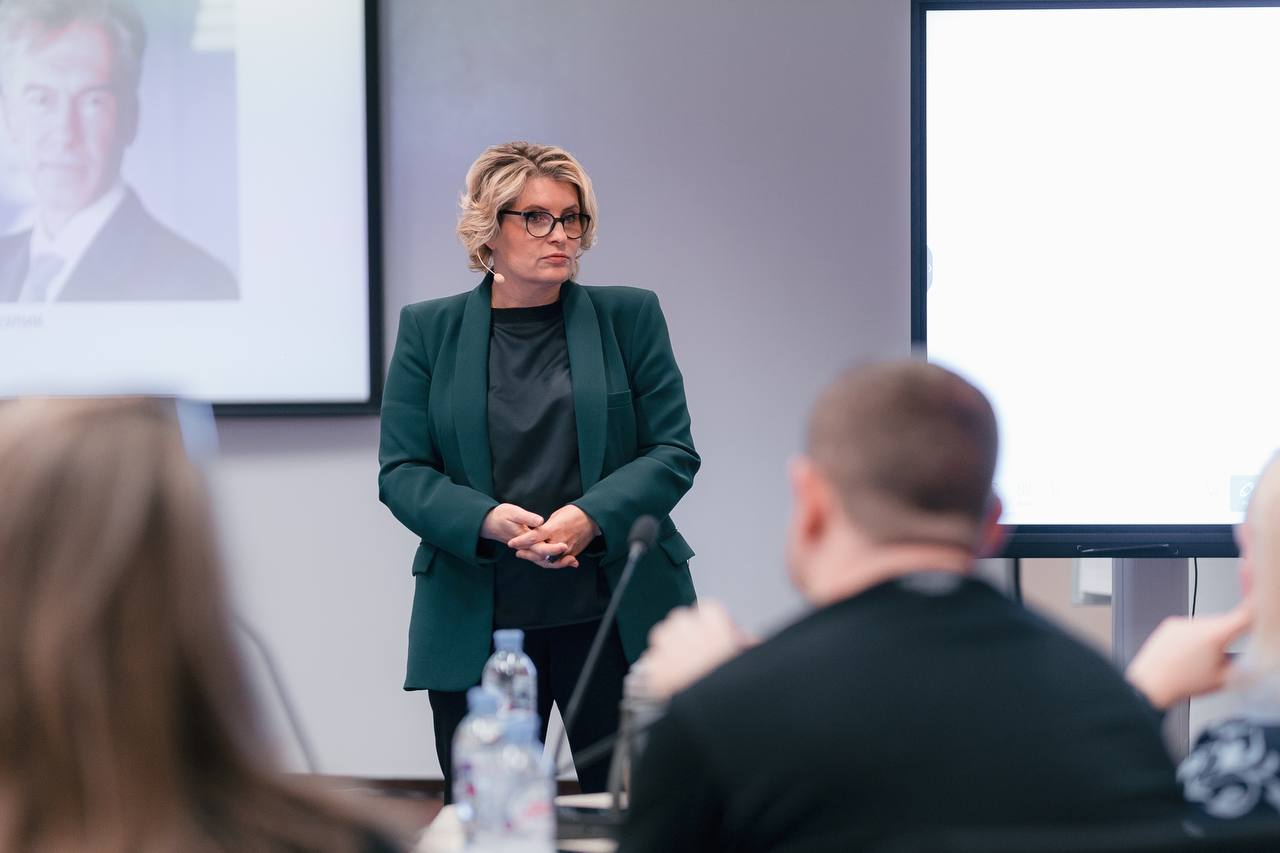
Mironyuk during her lecture at SKOLKOVO School of Management

Svetlana Vasiliyevna Mironyuk (Russian: Светлана Васильевна Миронюк; born 3 January 1981) is a Russian top manager who is currently a Professor of Business Practice, Innovation catalyst and Dean for Operations and Digital at SKOLKOVO School of Management. Former media executive, head and editor-in-chief of the RIA Novosti news agency, having been appointed chair of the board in 2003 and director general in 2004. A graduate of Moscow State University.

Mironyuk was born on 3 January 1968 in Moscow. She gained her Executive MBA at the University of Chicago Booth School of Business in 2016. She also holds qualifications in Behavioural Economics from Yale School of Management and in Digital Economy, Marketplaces and Fintech from Stanford Graduate School of Business. She is currently studying for a DBA at Bocconi University.

Mironyuk has considerable experience of management in Russian corporations and media holdings. Prior to entering academia, she held management positions in a number of Russian corporations and media holdings. She was also a key figure in the establishment of Russia's first independent media: NTV, Echo of Moscow and Segodnya newspaper.

Between 2003 and 2014, Mironyuk worked as Editor-in-Chief of Russia's media holding, RIA Novosti, and oversaw the organisation's transformation into a market leader. From 2016 to 2018, she led a similar transformation in marketing at Sberbank, Russia's largest bank, and PwC Russia. She became Professor of Business Practice at SKOLKOVO School of Management in 2016 and in 2019 was named the school's Dean for Operations and Digital.

On 9 December 2013 President of Russia Vladimir Putin issued a decree which abolished RIA Novosti and merged it with the international radio service Voice of Russia to create the new information agency Rossiya Segodnya. On the same day, Mironyuk issued a statement saying that she was not aware of the decision until the decree was published, and that she believed the purpose to be to economize rather than to optimize the information service. This statement caused some protests, and on the next day Mironyuk issued another statement. Without formally retracting the first statement, she said that the duty of all employees of RIA Novosti was to implement the decree of the president, and those who disagreed with the decree were in fact destabilizing the situation, and their activity was purely destructive.

Mironyuk has received a number of state and professional awards in recognition of her achievements. In 2016, she was recognised by AKARussia as one of the top marketing directors in Russia's finance industry. She was named media manager of the year in 2007 and 2011, and in 2013 was named media manager of the decade. She holds an Order of Honour and an Order for Merit to the Fatherland (IV degree).
