= Russia Today (disambiguation) =

Russia Today may refer to:

- RT (TV network), a global news channel from Russia (which was known as Russia Today before its rebranding in 2009)
- Rossiya Segodnya, an international news agency from Russia (the name translates to Russia Today)
- Russian Federation Today, a semi-monthly magazine from Russia

== See also ==
- Rossiya Segodnya (disambiguation)
