= Yaroslav Ognev =

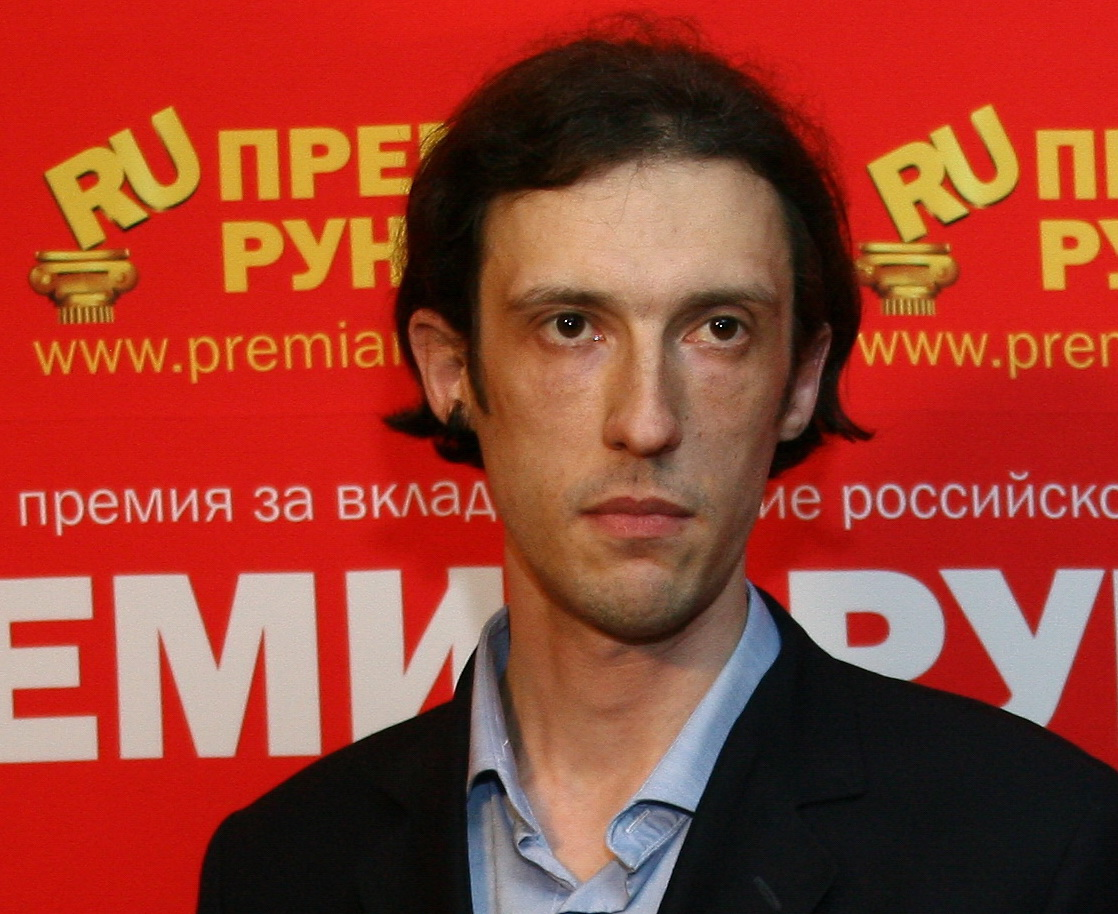
- Born: Yaroslav Vladimirovich Ognev; September 18, 1969; Moscow, Soviet Union
- Occupations: Journalist, Internet personality

Yaroslav Vladimirovich Ognev (Russian: Яросла́в Влади́мирович О́гнев; born 18 September 1969 in Moscow) is a Russian Internet personality, co-founder and the first editor-in-chief of inoSMI, an internet media project that monitors and translates into Russian articles published in foreign media.

== Personal life and career ==
Ognev was born in Moscow, Soviet Union in 1969. In 1986 he finished the “special school” No. 38 in Moscow, where several subjects were taught in English. In 1987 Ognev was conscripted to serve in the Soviet Army, where he spent two years. In 1998 he graduated from the Moscow State University majoring in the history of Russian philosophy. In 2000 Ognev became co-founder of InoSMI under the auspices of Strana.ru, an online resource organised as part of Vladimir Putin’s electoral campaign. In 2002 the website was transferred to VGTRK and on 20 February 2004 was further passed on to RIA Novosti. Ognev continued to be editor-in-chief of inoSMI until February 2009. Since February 2009 Ognev is editor of the governmental Voice of Russia radio station’s Internet service.

== Controversies ==
During his stint as the editor-in-chief of InoSMI Ognev kept low profile most of the time, which fed suspicions about the character of his relations with the Russian authorities and special services, especially in the light of the perceived “anti-Western” nature of InoSMI (according to media analyst Evgeny Morozov, the website “selectively translates foreign press into Russian often projecting an image of extremely hostile, biased, and incompetent Western press”

=== The InoSMI forum ===
In late 2003 InoSMI launched its forum which became Russia’s first web forum to freely discuss translations from foreign media. Between October 2004 and April 2005 the forum did not function. When reopened, it became the most recognizable part of InoSMI. In one of his interviews, Ognev admitted it was the portal’s “soul”, almost more important that its “face” (the content). The forum community that after Ognev’s dismissal moved to InoForum widely believed their anti-Western opinions were the reason why Ognev was replaced by Marina Pustilnik seen as more “liberal”.

=== The 2005 Tygodnik Powszechny controversy ===
In March 2005, following the Orange Revolution in Ukraine, InoSMI translated an article by Marian Kałuski originally published in several Polish websites, including the forum of Tygodnik Powszechny. Kałuski criticized the Polish authorities for rapprochement with Ukraine, arguing that it was caused by US pressure. As Tygodnik Powszechny was known for its ardent support for the Orange Revolution, this publication caused an influx of visitors, which was interpreted as a DDos attack. Various experts opined it was an operation of Russian special services to test their cyberwar capabilities.

=== The 2009 dismissal ===
Ognev’s dismissal as editor-in-chief of InoSMI sent shockwaves across Runet. According to Morozov, "what used to be one of the most popular news sites on the Russian internet quickly disintegrated, with the most aggressive fans of the Ognev empire even launching DDOS attacks on their favorite site". Some believed that was caused by inconsistency of opinions expressed on the forum with the burgeoning reset in US-Russian relations. Nationalist media argued that the arrival of US-educated Marina Pustilnik was a victory of “liberals” in Russia’s top echelons of power over “patriots”. Anatoly Wasserman, a cult figure for Russia’s Internet generation said Ognev’s dismissal was “the murder of InoSMI”. Meanwhile, Ognev said in his blog that his dismissal had been absolutely voluntary.

== In the Voice of Russia ==
On 1 June 2009 Ognev was appointed Internet broadcasting editor of the Voice of Russia radio station that had been previously known as Radio Moscow and served as an external propaganda tool for the USSR. Morozov believed Ognev’s chief task at the Voice of Russia would be to build its Internet presence [...]; given his excellent track record at Inosmi, he may as well succeed. In fact, two years after Ognev’s arrival at the Voice of Russia the number of unique visitors for the website increased from 20,000 to 2 million (only in February 2009, when he left InoSMI, this figure increased twofold). At the same time, the bulk of visitors come from Russia, which testifies to reorientation of the Voice of Russia’s website to the Russian of Russian-speaking audience. Since 2012 Ognev is in charge of The Voice of Russia'a Global Discussion interactive project.
