= InoSMI =

Russian state media website

inoSMI
- Website type: News site
- Available in: Russian
- Editor: Marina Pustilnik
- Website: http://www.inosmi.ru/
- Commercial: Yes
- Registration: Free/Subscription
- Launched: February 2004
- Current status: Active

inoSMI (Russian: иноСМИ, a derivation from "foreign mass media") is an internet media project that monitors and translates articles published in foreign and Western media into Russian, and is part of the state media group Rossiya Segodnya.

== History ==
The service is affiliated with the RIA Novosti news agency and is sponsored by Russia's Federal Agency on Press and Mass Communications (FAPMC).

The project was masterminded and directed by Yaroslav Ognev who has been serving as its editor-in-chief since its foundation. In March 2009, Marina Pustilnik was assigned the editor-in-chief of inoSMI.

Current chief editor is Alexey Dubosarsky.

== Activity ==
The translations are published online on a daily basis. The range of topics varies: culture, politics, social and other. But most of the translated articles are analytical essays written by Western journalists on topics related to Russia and the former Soviet Union. Regular news articles are rarely published. inoSMI also publishes videos, blogs and the most remarkable issues from the world's leading media forums.

While the service has several professional translators on its payroll, a noticeable fraction of translations is performed by its eager readers on a voluntary basis. Readers also participate in media monitoring, as they may suggest an article for translation.

Since its foundation, the site has a forum where new publications are discussed. The moderation policy is rather loose and allows for a variety of views. Material that can be regarded by editors as promoting competing reader projects will be censored though.

An unusual phenomenon that took off recently on inoSMI forum can be described as a massive voluntary effort in translating into Russian other readers' forums hosted by foreign media.

inoSMI also invites leading foreign journalists and editors to discuss the publications with Russian readers. For instance, Stanislaw Lem's conference with the inosmi.ru readers on 17 January 2006 was the last press conference before his death.

=== Sanctions ===
In February 2023 Canada sanctioned InoSMI for being involved in Russian propaganda and spreading misinformation relating to the invasion of Ukraine.

== Achievements ==
inoSMI claims a daily audience of 70,000–90,000 visitors, most of them from Russia.

In 2007, it won the "Culture and Mass Media" category of the Runet Prize, supervised by the FAPMC.

== Viewpoint of Ognev ==
The first editor-in-chief of the resource explained his viewpoint in numerous interviews. In a February 2009 interview to the REGNUM News Agency, he said:

InoSMI broadens one's conscience. It occurred so, that it's read by those who aren't satisfied with the Russian press. By those, who are touched with the intelligence of Western journalists and experts, their professionalism and analytical capabilities. By those, who understand a deal of the free media, democracy and Russian bears that they love so much ... The activity of InoSMI led yet to the one sensible result — foreign media now can be considered actually worldwide. They are not only being avidly read, but also loved in Russia. Without that "avid" love of the Russian people the audience of the foreign media would be incomplete and their influence won't be worldwide.

Attitude of the foreign press to Russia changed in the 21st century and became more critical. For example, British media became less sober, but more uniform. Their American colleagues, who are a sort of a reference of the free and democratic media for the world perform today perhaps the most difficult and critical towards Russia mission. They do everything possible to return it to the path of democracy, and even more to that, their status doesn't only oblige but even dictate them to do that. Criticism in this case plays the role of the major weapon of the democracy, the aggressivity and positivitiness of which often resemble well the dictatorship.

The forum is the soul of the site, which speaks about the site perhaps even more than its face (contents) sais. Its existence evidences that the editorial board is fearless, trusts its readers and isn't afraid that that face would be lost or overthrown under the surge of their "collective mind" ... The text without readers comments is incomplete and bears little information. Indeed, if InoSMI did not have a forum, how could one not to feel despair looking at all what's get published here? It's the first, the greatest and the most influential world forum at a site of foreign press translations. As the mirror of the mirror InoSMI, it is wholly and entirely (but not ultimately) born by Western media and is their fortune, owing to which the latter become more close to and understandable by our reader.

== Assignment of Pustilnik ==
On March 11, 2009, RIA Novosti announced assigning a new editor-in-chief of the resource, Marina Pustilnik. The explanation included:

First of all, the resource will broaden the informational and analytical view, meaning that not only critical information about Russia will appear at the site, but also weighted viewpoints will get published, as well as the list of topics and headlines will be broadened.

While prior to the depicted events the resource enjoyed about 700,000 visits and 150,000 visitors a day, those numbers got decreased approximately 1.5 times in few days.

== Literature ==
- How a Kremlin-Linked Influence Operation is Systematically Manipulating Western Media to Construct & Communicate Disinformation, part 1 «DETECTION REPORT», Cardiff University, Whales, England, 2021
- Anneleen Spiessens, Piet Van Poucke. Translating news discourse on the Crimean crisis: patterns of reframing on the Russian website InoSMI, Ghent University, Ghent, Belgium, 2016
- Julie Fedor, Andreas Umland, Andriy Portnov, Fredheim Rolf. Journal of Soviet and Post-Soviet Politics and Society, стр. 37, 47–49, 71. Stuttgart, Germany, 2015
