= Kirill Vyshinsky =

Ukrainian-Russian journalist (1967–2025)

- Кирилл Вышинский
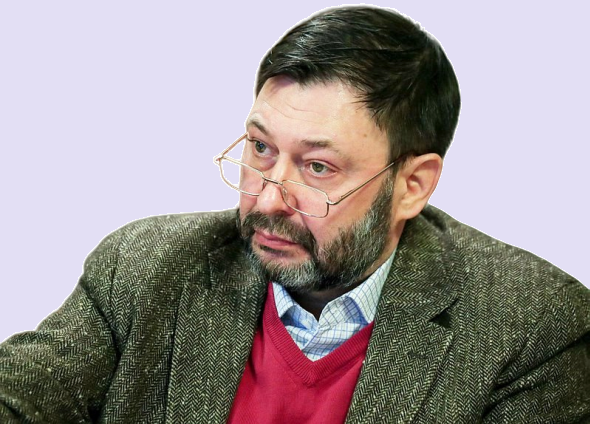
- Vyshinsky in 2019
- Born: 19 February 1967; Dnipropetrovsk, Ukrainian SSR, USSR
- Died: 23 August 2025 (aged 58); Moscow, Russia
- Citizenship: Soviet → Ukrainian, Russian
- Education: Dnipro National University
- Occupation: Journalist
- Employer: RIA Novosti
- Criminal charge: Treason (2018)
- Criminal status: Released (2019)

Kirill Valeryevich Vyshinsky (Russian: Кирилл Валериевич Вышинский; Ukrainian: Кирило Валерійович Вишинський, romanized: Kyrylo Valeriiovych Vyshynskyi; 19 February 1967 – 23 August 2025) was a Ukrainian–Russian journalist. He was the director of RIA Novosti's Ukraine branch (2014–2018). In 2018, Vyshinsky was arrested in Ukraine on charges of treason. In September 2019 he was exchanged with Russia where he continued his journalistic career.

== Life and career ==
Kirill Vyshinsky was born in Dnipropetrovsk, Ukrainian SSR. He received a Russian passport in 2015. On 1 June 2018, after his arrest, he said in court: "I declare my withdrawal from my Ukrainian citizenship -- from this moment I consider myself only a citizen of Russia."

=== Journalistic and social activities ===
In 1996–1998, Kirill Vyshinsky became the editor-in-chief of the local Dnipropetrovsk Channel 11, which at the time, belonged to Prime Minister Pavlo Lazarenko, and then came under the control of Viktor Pinchuk. From 1999 to 2006, Vyshinsky was the lead editor on ICTV.

In 2006, Vyshinsky became editor-in-chief of information services for the television and radio company Creative Production Association “Telefabrika”, and he was nominated as a candidate for deputy of the Dnipropetrovsk Oblast Council from the Dnipropetrovsk branch of the People's Party.

From 2006 to 2014, Vyshinsky worked as a correspondent for the program "Vesti" in Ukraine. Vyshinsky covered the 2013–2014 Euromaidan protests and the 2014 Ukrainian revolution. After “Euromaidan”, Vyshinsky became editor-in-chief of RIA Novosti - Ukraine.

On 30 September 2015, Vyshinsky, a Ukrainian citizen, became a dual-citizen after receiving Russian citizenship. Ukrainian law does not recognise dual citizenship. However, since Ukraine became independent in 1991 there have been several (media) reports that there are citizens of Ukraine who hold dual citizenship.

=== Arrest, trial and exchanged to Russia ===
Vyshinsky was arrested in Kyiv by the Security Service of Ukraine (SBU) on 15 May 2018. On 17 May, the Kherson City Court ordered him held for two months on charges of high treason. He was accused that his news agency was involved in a "hybrid information war" waged by Russia against Ukraine. Since the 2014 annexation of Crimea by Russia, Russia–Ukraine relations have been hostile. OSCE Representative on Freedom of the Media Harlem Désir expressed "serious concern". The Portuguese Minister of Foreign Affairs Augusto Santos Silva said about Vyshinsky's case that he "condemns any attempts to arrest people for their political views." Russian President Vladimir Putin said he considered the arrest to be "absolutely unprecedented and absolutely unacceptable". The United States Department of State "shares Ukraine's concern about Russian propaganda but added that Ukraine must ensure it abides by the law, including international human rights law."

After his arrest, Vyshinsky was awaiting trial in Ukraine. On 28 August 2019 Vyshinsky was released from prison pending trial. On 7 September, Kremlin spokesman Dmitry Peskov announced that Vyshinsky had "returned to Russia" in the context of a prisoner exchange with Ukraine. Vyshinsky thanked the OSCE's media freedom representative Harlem Désir who had called for Vyshinsky's release. On 9 September 2019 Vyshinsky was appointed executive director of Rossiya Segodnya.

=== Death ===
Vyshinsky died on 23 August 2025, at the age of 58.

== See also ==
- Freedom of the press in Ukraine
- Human rights in Ukraine
