= Michał Weinzieher =

Polish-Jewish art historian and art critic (1903–1944)

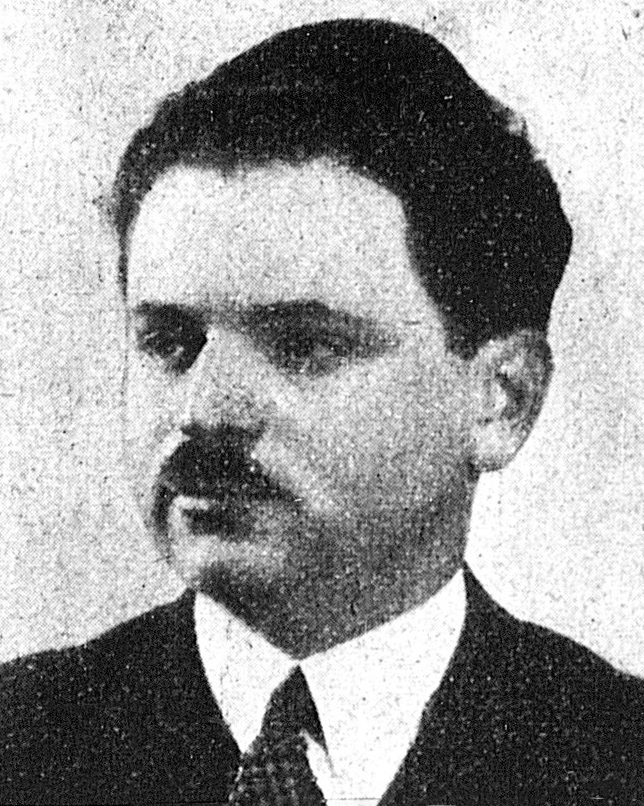
Michał Weinzieher in 1933

Michał Weinzieher (1 June 1903, in Będzin, Russian Empire, Polish lands of the Russian Partition – April 1944, in Kraków) was a Polish-Jewish art historian and art critic, museologist, and separately also a writer on constitutional law (known for his studies of the thought of Leon Petrazycki). He also published several pieces of travel reportage from France, England, and the Soviet Union.

== Life ==
Michał Weinzieher was born on 1 June 1903 in the town of Będzin, in the Dąbrowa Basin (Zagłębie Dąbrowskie) of the western Lesser Poland geographical area, about 13 kilometres south-west of Katowice and about 88 km north-west of Kraków. The town counted 30,124 inhabitants in 1901. His father, Dr. Salomon Weinzieher (1869–1943?), a physician and director of a regional hospital, was one of the most distinguished citizens of his town and its province and a member of Parliament (including, for a time, chairman of its Jewish caucus). Weinzieher had also a younger brother, (Jan) Jakub Weinzieher (1908–1940), a physician like his father and a lieutenant (podporucznik) of the Polish Air Force, who would perish in the Katyn Massacre perpetrated by the Soviet secret police. Their father was murdered in the Holocaust after being deported from the Będzin Ghetto to Auschwitz concentration camp on 1 August 1943 (other sources indicate he was murdered in the Ghetto).

A teenager during the early period of the Second Polish Republic, Weinzieher fought in the Polish–Soviet War in 1920 as a volunteer in the Polish Army (Wojsko Polskie II RP). He was educated at Warsaw University, his father's alma mater, where he earned a law degree. A frequent contributor to the Nasz Przegląd newspaper, he served as the director of the Jewish Society for the Propagation of the Fine Arts (Żydowskie Towarzystwo Krzewienia Sztuk Pięknych) in Warsaw until 1939, a city where he maintained friendship with the poet Bruno Jasieński. In his art criticism he emphasized the role of ideology and "guiding principles" over "sterile objectivism" and impartiality, including in the organizing of art exhibitions which ought to follow the same principles if they were truthfully to render the profiles of such painters as Picasso and Matisse. Weinzieher took a lively interest in all aspects of life of the Jewish community in the interbellum Poland, participating for example in the organizational activities of the Jewish Sightseeing Society (Żydowskie Towarzystwo Krajoznawcze) and other similar bodies. He was also the director of the Historical Museum in Lwów (Muzeum Historyczne we Lwowie, now within the territory of Ukraine).

During the Second World War, in the early part of 1940, he married the well-known poet Zuzanna Ginczanka in Lwów, then newly occupied by the Soviet Union, where both sought shelter from the Germans. Following Nazi Germany's attack on the Soviet Union of 22 June 1941 and the Nazi occupation of Lwów later the same month, he moved with his wife to Kraków in September 1942, where he disguised his identity by assuming the pseudonym Michał Danilewicz. However, he was eventually arrested by the Gestapo early in 1944, and subsequently perished at their hands. On 6 April 1944 there appeared pasted on the walls of Kraków an announcement issued by the "Summary Court-martial of the Security Police" (Standgericht der Sicherheitspolizei) listing 112 names of people sentenced to death: the first 33 names were those on whom the sentence of death had already been carried out, the rest were those awaiting execution. Michał Weinzieher's name is among the latter. Although the precise date of his death is uncertain, it is known that he had predeceased his wife, who was also murdered by the Nazis several months later.

The surname is sometimes misspelled "Weinziher" in Polish usage.

== Publications ==
- "Eugeniusz Zak: wspomnienie pośmiertne" (1926)
- "Uroda Miss Judei" (Nasz Przegląd, 31 March 1929)
- "Fermenty literackie" (Europa, 1930)
- Symche Trachter, Paris (1930)
- Wystawa prac Zygmunta Menkesa: styczeń 1931 (1931)
- Idee prawno-państwowe Leona Petrażyckiego (1931)
- Refleksje nad ideami prawno-handlowemi Leona Petrażyckiego (1932)
- "O racjonalną politykę muzealną" (Wiadomości Literackie, 6 January 1935)

== Bibliography ==
=== Major sources ===
- Czy wiesz kto to jest?, ed. S. Łoza, Warsaw, Wydawnictwa Artystyczne i Filmowe (for the Zrzeszenie Księgarstwa), 1983, page 336. (Reprint of the ed. Warsaw, Wydawnictwo Głównej Księgarni Wojskowej, 1938.)
- Kto był kim w Drugiej Rzeczypospolitej, ed. J. M. Majchrowski, et al., Warsaw, Polska Oficyna Wydawnicza BGW, 1994, page 465. ISBN 8370665691.
- Marian Kałuski, Ku pamięci i w podzięce Jankielom: mały leksykon Żydów-patriotów polskich, Warsaw, Von Borowiecky, 2001, page 179. ISBN 8387689378.

=== Other ===
- Ruch Służbowy (supplement to the Dziennik Urzędowy Ministerstwa Sprawiedliwości), Warsaw, The Justice Ministry (of the Second Polish Republic), 1929.
- Włodzimierz Bartoszewicz, "Buda na Powiślu", Warsaw, Państwowy Instytut Wydawniczy, 1966, passim.
- Rocznik Komisji Historycznoliterackiej, vol. 11, Wrocław, Zakład Narodowy im. Ossolińskich, 1973, page 102.
- Polskie życie artystyczne w latach 1915–1939, ed. A. Wojciechowski, Wrocław, Zakład Narodowy im. Ossolińskich, 1974, pages 208 & 579.
- Marian Stępień, Ze stanowiska lewicy: studium jednego z nurtów polskiej krytyki literackiej lat 1919–1939, Kraków, Wydawnictwo Literackie, 1974, pages 350 & 426.
- Janina Dziarnowska, Słowo o Brunonie Jasieńskim, Warsaw, Książka i Wiedza, 1978, passim.
- Marian Fuks, Prasa żydowska w Warszawie, 1823–1939, Warsaw, Państwowe Wydawnictwo Naukowe, 1979, pages 263 & 270. ISBN 8301004568.
- The Jewish Press That Was: Accounts, Evaluations, and Memories of Jewish Papers in Pre-Holocaust Europe, tr. H. Shachter, ed. A. Bar, Tel Aviv, World Federation of Jewish Journalists, 1980.
- Jerzy Malinowski, Grupa "Jung Idysz" i żydowskie środowisko "Nowej Sztuki" w Polsce, 1918–1923, Warsaw, PAN, 1987, passim.
- Eugenia Prokop-Janiec, Polish-Jewish Literature in the Interwar Years, tr. A. Shenitzer, Syracuse (New York), Syracuse University Press, 2003, page 22. ISBN 0815629842. (1st Polish ed., 1992.)
- Izolda Kiec, Zuzanna Ginczanka: życie i twórczość, Poznań, Obserwator, 1994, pages 149, 159, 161. ISBN 8390172003.
- Agnieszka Chrzanowska, Metaloplastyka żydowska w Polsce, Warsaw, Wydawnictwo Neriton, 2005, pages 8, 66, 74, 88, 93, 97–118. ISBN 8389729229.
- Honorata Bartoszewska-Butryn, Twórczość plastyczna Konrada Winklera w latach 1918–1939 and Aneta Dardzińska, Aleksander Rafałowski: monografia twórczości do 1939 roku, Warsaw, Wydawnictwo Neriton, 2006, pages 86, 166, 222, and 225. ISBN 838972961X.
- Jerzy Malinowski & Barbara Brus-Malinowska, W kręgu École de Paris: malarze żydowscy z Polski, Warsaw, Wydawnictwo DiG, 2007. ISBN 8371813945, ISBN 9788371813948.
- Słownik artystów polskich i obcych w Polsce działających (zmarłych przed 1966 r.): malarze, rzeźbiarze, graficy, vol. 8 (Pó–Ri), ed. U. Makowska & K. Mikocka-Rachubowa, Warsaw, Instytut Sztuki Polskiej Akademii Nauk, 2007, passim. ISBN 9788389101693.

== See also ==
- Leon Petrazycki
- Zuzanna Ginczanka
