= Ognev =

Ognev (Russian: Огнёв, feminine: Ogneva) is a Russian surname. Notable people with the surname include:

- Sergey Ognev (1886–1951), Russian zoologist and naturalist
- Yaroslav Ognev (born 1969), Russian Internet personality
