= Symche Trachter =

Polish painter

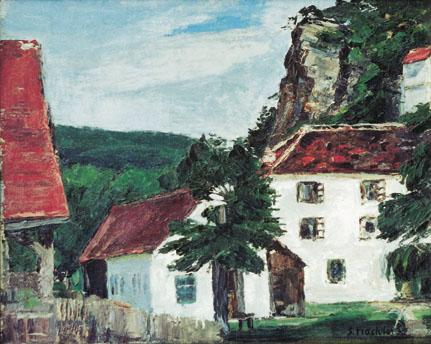
Landscape from Kazimierz Dolny 1935

Symche Trachter, full name Szymon Symche Binem Trachter (1890 or 1894 – 1942) was a Polish painter of Jewish descent.

== Biography ==
In his youth he was a pupil of Jacek Malczewski in Kraków, one of the most famous painters of Polish Symbolism. Subsequently he pursued his studies in Vienna in 1918, and in Paris in 1927. He exhibited in Paris in 1930. Symche Trachter was active at Kraków, and also participated in exhibitions organized by the Jewish Society for the Propagation of the Fine Arts.

During the Second World War he was interned in the Warsaw Ghetto, but continued his artistic activities even in detention, decorating with frescoes — together with another painter and fellow detainee, Feliks Frydman — the walls of the main reception hall within the seat of the Ghetto's Judenrat. In 1942 he was deported by the Nazis from the Warsaw Ghetto on one of the first transports to the Treblinka extermination camp, where he was murdered in the Holocaust.

== Bibliography ==
- Michał Weinzieher, Symche Trachter, Paris (1930)
- Michał Weinzieher, Introduction; in: Symche Trachter: katalog wystawy, Warsaw, Żydowskie Towarzystwo Krzewienia Sztuk Pięknych, 1930.
- The Museum of the Jewish Historical Institute: Arts and Crafts, comp. & ed. I. Brzewska, et al., tr. B. Piotrowska, Warsaw, Auriga, Wydawnictwa Artystyczne i Filmowe (for the Żydowski Instytut Historyczny w Polsce), 1995. ISBN 8322106424. (Unpaged.)
- Jerzy Malinowski, Malarstwo i rzeźba Żydów polskich w XIX i XX wieku, vol. 1, Warsaw, Wydawnictwo Naukowe PWN, 2000. ISBN 8301131780.
- Allgemeines Künstlerlexikon: die bildenden Künstler aller Zeiten und Völker, vol. 33, Munich, Saur, 2002. Digital edition available online.
- Adrian Darmon, Autour de l'art juif: encyclopédie des peintres, photographes et sculpteurs, Chatou, Éditions Carnot, 2003, p. 110. ISBN 2848550112. (With an extensive list of further sources on pp. 338–339.)
