= Galina Shergova =

Soviet-Russian writer

- Born: Galina Mikhailovna Shergova; 31 August 1923; Chita, USSR
- Died: 11 May 2017 (aged 93); Moscow, Russia
- Occupations: screenwriter writer

Galina Mikhailovna Shergova (Russian: Галина Михайловна Ше́ргова; 31 August 1923 – 11 May 2017) was a Soviet and Russian writer who participated in the creation of more than 200 films and TV movies. In 1978, she was the winner of the USSR State Prize.

== Biography ==
Shergova was born 31 August 1923 in Chita into a family of doctors. Her grandfather was the cantonments. Since 1933 she has lived in Moscow. During the Great Patriotic War she was an employee of the newspaper front of the 5th Panzer Army, The Assault!, and received battle wounds. In 1948 she graduated from the Maxim Gorky Literature Institute. She became a poet, and has worked with documentaries since 1959. She worked with Roman Karmen.

As a screenwriter, author and narrator she participated in the creation of more than 200 films and TV movies. Since 1967 she has been a television writer and presenter. She is the artistic director of a television series, and was one of the authors of Minute of Silence.

== Family ==
Her husband Alexander Yurovsky (writer), professor of Moscow State University (1921–2003). Kseniya Shergova, daughter, a documentary filmmaker. Two granddaughters.

== Awards ==
- USSR State Prize (1978)
- Award TEFI for legend of the Russian TV
- Dovzhenko Gold Medal (1975)
- Order of the Patriotic War II degree (1985)
- Medal for Battle Merit
- Order For Merit to the Fatherland IV degree (1995)
- Order of Honour (2011) — for his great contribution in the development of the national broadcasting and many years of fruitful activity
