= Petr Akopov =

Russian propagandist

Petr Akopov (Russian: Петр Акопов; born 7 October 1968) is a Russian propagandist and writer. Akopov writes and works for RIA Novosti, a Russian state-owned news agency.

Akapov was the author of the prematurely published and then retracted article titled "The arrival/attack of Russia and the new world" ("Наступление России и нового мира"), which was written in advance anticipating the Russian victory in the 2022 invasion of Ukraine. In the ominous article, Akapov announced that "Ukraine has returned to Russia" and condemned "Anglo-Saxons who rule the West" for "attempting to steal Russian land", and asserted that Russian President Vladimir Putin's launch of the invasion resolved the "Ukrainian question" to establish a "new world order" with "Russia, Belarus and Ukraine". Before the news agency retracted the article, it was republished by Pakistani newspaper The Frontier Post in English.

Akopov is listed by the database Putin's List as a Russian propagandist, accused of "public support for the Russian military aggression against Ukraine. He is also included in the report "1500 warmongers" compiled by the Free Russia Forum. The report contains the names of Russian propagandists and others who were publicly involved in supporting Putin's invasion of Ukraine. In July 2022, he was sanctioned by the Canadian government for his role in the Russian information war against Ukraine.
