= Irana Kazakova =

Soviet journalist (1928–2021)

- Ирана Казакова
- Born: 1928; Tehran, Iran
- Died: 2 February 2021 (aged 92–93)
- Occupation(s): Journalist, television anchor, writer

Irana Kazakova (Russian: Ирана Казакова; 1928 – 2 February 2021) was a Soviet journalist, television anchor and writer who first proposed the idea of the show Minute of Silence, a Soviet radio and television broadcast remembering all those lost in World War II. Kazakova stated that her reports consisted of "up to 1/2 per cent unprepared improvisation."

Kazakova was born in Tehran to the family of Soviet diplomat Dmitry Kazakov. She graduated from Moscow State Institute of International Relations and worked for the Soviet government's international radio broadcasting service (Innoveschaniye) then as a TV anchor for the Soviet Central Television. She married Nikolay Panskov, Soviet ambassador to Mauritius, and spent five years in Mauritius. She wrote a book, Paradise on Earth is inevitable (Рай на земле неизбежен) about her life on this island.

Kazakova died on 2 February 2021.
