= Minuta Molchanya =

Radio and TV broadcast in the Soviet Union and Russia

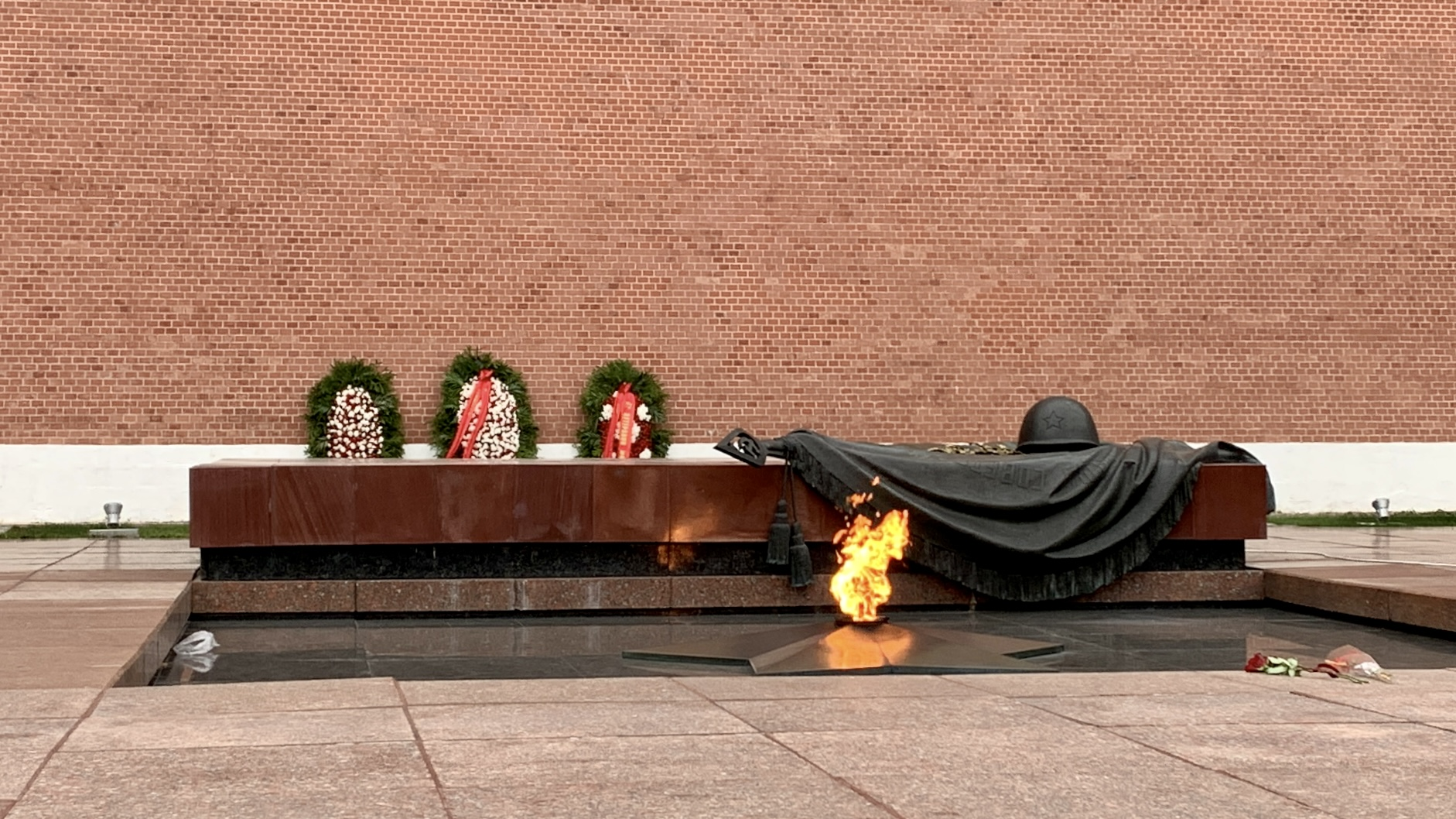
- The Eternal Flame at the Tomb of the Unknown Soldier
- Created by: Irana Kazakova
- Written by: Natalia Levitskaya
- Country of origin: Soviet Union; Russia
- Original language: Russian

Production
- Producers: Soviet Central TV Management Production; Studio Ekran; Ostankino Radio Television Directorate under management from National Media Group
- Running time: 15 minutes; 8 minutes; 5 minutes; 10 Minutes

Original release
- Release: May 9, 1965 – present

Minuta Molchanya (Russian: Минута молчания; translated as Minute of Silence), also known by its full title as To the Bright Memory of the Fallen in the Fight Against Fascism (Russian: Светлой Памяти павших в борьбе против фашизма), is a broadcast aired at 18:00 UTC annually in Russia on 9 May, dedicated to the victims of Great Patriotic War. It is broadcast on all radio and television stations across Russia and the former USSR on Victory Day. It was first broadcast on Soviet Central Television in 1965, 20 years after the Allied victory over Nazi Germany.

== History ==
The first version of Minuta Molchanya program, designed to honor the memory of those who died during the Great Patriotic War, was created by Gosteleradio of the USSR. Gosteleradio chairman Nikolai Mesyatsev appointed journalists Irana Kazakova to work on the television script and Arkady Revenko worked for radio script. They worked alongside At the suggestion of the director of the All Union First Programme Ekaterina Tarkhanova, both scripts were read by the actress Vera Yenyutina, and both the opening and closing text by the announcer Yuri Levitan. The filming of the television version for the first two years was carried out in the pavilion of Ostankino Technical Center, which was decorated with a plaster bowl containing burning fire.. After the construction of the Eternal Flame at the grave of the Unknown Soldier, filming was moved there.

The broadcast typically started with the call signal of Radio Moscow and the announcement by the Soviet radio voice Yuri Levitan, famous for his announcements during the Second World War. The address was initially narrated by well-known Soviet radio commenter and actress Vera Enyutina to a choral version of Träumerei by Schumann in the background, followed by a piece from Symphony No. 6 by Tchaikovsky. The Minute of Silence itself was accompanied by the toll of the Moscow Kremlin bells and the clock at the Spasskaya Tower striking seven in the evening. The TV version showed a flame with the text "To the Memory of the Fallen". The program ended with musical pieces from Piano Concerto No. 2 by Rachmaninoff, Toccata, Adagio and Fugue in C major (BWV 564) by Bach, and Symphony No. 3 by Scriabin. Due to its solemnity the address was informally known as "the prayer".

Since in 1970, the post of chairman of Gosteleradio was occupied by Sergey Lapin, the Minute of Silence has undergone a number of changes for the first time since inception. Evgeny Sinitsyn and Galina Shergova were involved in writing the new text. At one time, program included reading excerpts from the book Malaya Zemlya (1978), written by the General Secretary of the Central Committee of the CPSU Leonid Brezhnev.

Later, after Yenyutina emigrated to the USA in 1976, other TV and radio announcers read the text, and minor changes were made to the broadcast's graphics. Between 1976-1983, 1990-1991, 1996-2011 and since 2015 (final text), the text was read by Igor Kirillov; in 1984-1985 read by Alexey Tasmin; in 1986-1989 by Olga Vysotskaya; and in 2012-2013 by Evgeny Khoroshevtsev. On November 7, 1987, the 70th anniversary of the October Revolution, at 13:50, a similar program, "In Memory Of The Fallen Fighters For Soviet Power", aired. From 1988 to 1991, the Second Program of the Central Television of the USSR simulcast the Minute with sign language interpretation for the deaf.

After the dissolution of the Soviet Union in December 1991, the format was redesigned under Presidency of Boris Yeltsin. In particular, the footage of the burning Eternal Flame was removed, and the rest of the video sequence was also completely updated. According to Komsomolskaya Pravda, in the first post-Soviet years of broadcasting the authors tried to make reports from Red Square, hired Nikita Mikhalkov to shoot "crosses and domes of Russia" from a bird's-eye view and personally read the voiceover. This version was broadcast only on state channels (in 1992, these were 1st channel Ostankino, MTK, 4th channel Ostankino, Channel Five and RTR, in 1993 and 1994 — the same TV channels, but without MTK.) During the 1995 golden jubilee edition marking the 50th anniversary of the war's end—Russian Universities, TV6, REN TV, STS, TNT, Muz-TV and other Russian private television channels—began simulcasting the Minute.

In 1996, at the initiative of the newly formed Public Television of Russia (PTR) it was decided to return to the old format, again with the voice of Igor Kirillov. The first edition was shown in 1996-1997, the second in 1998-2002, the third in 2003-2004, the fourth in 2005, the fifth in 2006-2008 (from that moment onwards with black margins at the top and bottom); the last one was in 2009-2013. The program was produced by the Directorate of registration of the broadcast Channel One. Filming took place every 3-4 years on May 8, when citizens have access to the grave of the Unknown Soldier. Since the same year, since the Minute of Silence became a joint all-Russian broadcast organized on the initiative of PTR for all TV networks of Russia, the program also began to be shown on MTK, and on such private central channels as NTV and TV-6. Since 1997, it has been simultaneously broadcast on commercial cable stations (M1, REN-TV, CTC, TNT, Muz-TV, MTV Russia and others).

In 2003, some of the music was cut from the programme and its running time was cut to six minutes. By then, a Belarusian version featuring the Eternal Flame in Minsk and guards of honour of the Military Commandanture had begun airing, produced by Belteleradio for Belarus-1, whose feed is simulcast on all public and private TV stations in that country. Since 2004, a Minute of Silence has been broadcast on all sports channels produced by NTV Plus (since 2016 - by the GPM Match! Sub-holding). In 2006, the Digital Telefamily of Channel One, along with some private cable TV channels (except on Religious and TV Shopping channels), aired the broadcast for the first time.

On May 9, 2005 (in connection with the arrival in Moscow of a large number of foreign leaders to celebrate the 60th anniversary of the Victory), a nationwide Minute of Silence was included in the official protocol of the events and immediately preceded the festive concert on Red Square, thereby the broadcast was postponed from 18:55 to 19:55. The traditional video sequence of the burning Eternal Flame was replaced for a few seconds by a live broadcast from Red Square, where the heads of foreign delegations, along with the Russian leadership, paid tribute to the fallen..

Beginning in 2010, the footage of the Minute of Silence this time included the granite obelisk honouring the fallen from every Russian City of Military Glory, a title bestowed since 2005 on cities and towns that had been either battlefields or major military bases during the war against the Axis powers.

On May 9, 2014, the Minute of Silence underwent significant changes to adjust to modern broadcast standards. The innovation included a poem "Requiem" by Robert Rozhdestvensky and photographs of those who died in the Great Patriotic War, which were then replaced by a video sequence with a demonstration of the Eternal Flame. Excerpts from the poem were voiced by TV announcers of Channel One Boris Mironov and Lyubov Germanova. The pictures were updated every year and some photos of the fallen have been provided from the "Victory in Faces" Historical Depositarium and the Victory Museum. While maintaining the overall video composition, the photos are replaced annually by new ones. The rejection of the previous format was due to the fact that in recent years, there are fewer veterans to come to the grave of the Unknown Soldier.

During the Minute on May 9, 2015, photograph reel of the victims was followed by an excerpt from the speech of Russian President Vladimir Putin for the 70th anniversary of Victory Day. During the demonstration of the Eternal Flame, Igor Kirillov can be heard saying the traditional phrase "Eternal memory to the heroes who fell for the freedom and independence of our Motherland!", which was omitted in the 2014 version. The initial landscape sketch of Moscow was also supplemented with a plan for the Historical Museum, omitted in the 2014 version.

On May 9, 2020, during the COVID-19 pandemic in Russia, with the traditional parade postponed and Russians required to stay home, the traditional song "Den Pobedy" was added to the broadcast, sung by Russian pop artists such as Lev Leshchenko, Vladimir Pozner, Tatiana Tarasova, and Dmitry Kharatyan. Produced by Russia-1, it aired following the 55th Minute of Silence.

== Announcers ==
- Igor Kirillov (1976–1983, 1990–1991, 1996–2011)
- Alexy Zadachin (1984–1985)
- Olga Vystotskaya (1986–1989)
- Evgeny Khoroshevtsev (2012–2013)
- Boris Mironov and Lyubov Germanova (2014–present)
