= Dmitry Kiselyov =

Russian television presenter (born 1954)

- Дмитрий Киселев
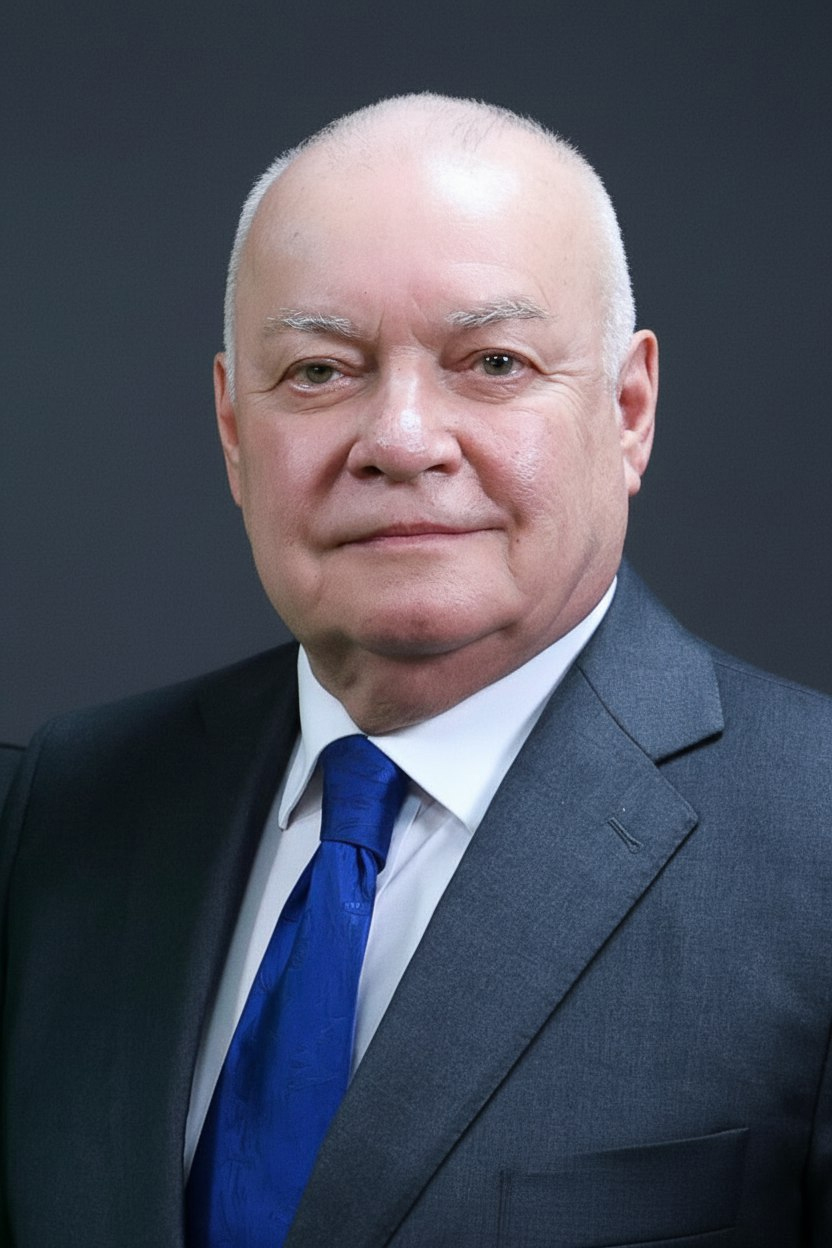
- Born: April 26, 1954; Moscow
- Occupations: News presenter, television presenter, propagandist, journalist
- Awards: Order of Friendship (2011); Order "For Merit to the Fatherland", 4th class (2014); Order of St. Sergius of Radonezh 2nd class (2014)

Dmitry Konstantinovich Kiselyov (Note: Sometimes transcribed to English as Kiselev) (Russian: Дмитрий Константинович Киселёв; born April 26, 1954) is a Russian TV presenter and political propagandist. In 2013, Kiselyov was appointed by Russian president Vladimir Putin to head Rossiya Segodnya, a Russian state-controlled media group. He also serves as deputy director of the All-Russia State Television and Radio Broadcasting Company.

His comments have been controversial both in Russia and in the West, especially regarding homosexuality and the Euromaidan, the Annexation of Crimea by the Russian Federation in 2014 and his allegation of the US standing on "the side of the terrorist caliphate" ISIS, destroying Syria and bringing down Metrojet Flight 9268. Kiselyov has been on the list of personal sanctions imposed by the EU since 2014. In January 2023, Ukraine imposed economic sanctions on Dmitry for his support of 2022 Russian invasion of Ukraine.

== Early life ==
Kiselyov was born in Moscow on April 26, 1954. He was brought up in a musical environment, being the nephew of Soviet composer Yuri Shaporin, and graduated from School of Music in classical guitar. Kiselyov's maternal grandfather with a last name Nesmachno came from Western Ukraine, was a lieutenant colonel in the Russian Army and chief of engineering services of General Aleksei Brusilov. His father was a peasant from Tambov, who served in the cavalry in Kiev in 1937.

Kiselyov graduated from a school with in-depth study of the French language and studied at the Medical College Number 6 in Moscow.

In 1978 he graduated from the Department of Scandinavian Philology of philological faculty of Leningrad State University and claims to speak English, French, Norwegian and Swedish.

== Career ==
=== Work at the USSR State Radio and Television ===
After graduation, he worked in the Central Radio Broadcasting for foreign countries of the USSR State Television and Radio Broadcasting in the Norwegian and Polish editions.

On April 9, 1989, at the invitation of Eduard Sagalaev, he began working on the USSR Central Television, where he was a parliamentary correspondent for the "Vremya" program. The first reportage was from Tbilisi, covering bloody events near the government house. At one time he was a correspondent in Norway.

From January 1990 to March 1991 Kiselyov served as the host of the information program "Television News Service", aired on the First Program of Central Television. Due to his refusal to read a prepared text about the Soviet repression of protests in Vilnius, he was removed from news programs, after which he collaborated for some time with the German TV channels ARD and RTL, as well as the Japanese television company NHK.

=== Career from 1991 to early 2000s ===
In September 1991, after the Soviet August Coup and the appointment of a new leadership of the Central Television, he returned to the Vremya program, and was also the host of the Panorama program. Until the end of 1996, he held various positions at the Ostankino State Television and Radio Broadcasting Company (from 1995 to 2002 ORT, now Channel One). In 1992–1994, Kiselyov worked as correspondent of RGTRK Ostankino for Benelux. In 1994–1996, he was the host of the "Window to Europe" program on the same TV channel, for the creation of which Kiselyov received a grant from the European Commission aimed at supporting democratic institutions in Russia.

In March 1995, after the murder of Vladislav Listyev, he was the host of one of the issues of the topical interview "Rush Hour" of the VID television company, which was aired on Channel One Ostankino. Since April 3, 1995 – the host of this program on the newly created ORT channel. Initially, he worked alternately with Sergei Shatunov, but after his departure, he led the program alone. From the beginning of October 1995, he hosted the program alternately with Andrey Rasbash. He finally left the program in September 1996.

From 1997 to 2003 he hosted the talk show "National Interest", which aired first on REN-TV, then on the RTR channel from September 1997 to January 1998. From February 1999 it was broadcast by TNT and from autumn 1999 to January 2002 as "National Interest-2000 (2001)" on TVC. Later, it would air on the Ukrainian channel ICTV.

In December 1997, for the production of his own television programs, Kiselyov established the Perspective Television Projects company, which existed for several years.

Since February 1999, at one time he was also the author and host of the "Window to Europe" column on the morning channel "Day by Day" (TV-6).

From 1999 to 2000, Kiselyov presented TV Centre's flagship news program “Events”, under the heading “In the center of events”.

From the beginning to the mid-2000s, he lived in and worked for both Ukraine and Russia.

From 2000 to 2004 he served as the editor-in-chief of the information service of the Ukrainian television network ICTV and was the host of "Facts", ICTV's flagship news program. Around the same time, Kiselyov also hosted his own interview program "In detail with Dmitry Kiselyov". On November 26, 2004, the channel's journalists, at a meeting with ICTV CEO Alexander Bogutsky, expressed their distrust of Dmitry Kiselyov, saying that he distorted news broadcasts. Three days later, the general director announced the removal of Kiselyov from the management of the television company's news releases. Later, the ICTV channel officially denied this message. During the presidential elections in Ukraine in 2004, Dmitry Kiselyov took an active part in promoting on television the candidate from the Party of Regions close to Moscow, Viktor Yanukovych, to whom, in turn, the owner of ICTV, Victor Pinchuk, was loyal. After Viktor Yushchenko's election victory, Kiselyov continued to work on the TV channel until the expiration of his contract in March 2006.

From September 24, 2000 to November 9, 2003 he was published on the website of the radio station "Echo of Moscow" in the section "Comment of the week". He conducted seminars and workshops at the Internews television school of Manana Aslamazyan.

In 2003, while training on the motocross track, Kiselyov received a serious injury. He broke two ligaments in his knee, underwent three operations and spent a year on crutches.

=== On the TV channel "Russia-1" ===
From 2003 to 2004, he worked on the programs "Morning Talk" and "Authority".

From 2005 to 2008 Kiselyov hosted the daily information and analytical program "Vesti+" on "Russia". From 2005 to 2006 he conducted the topical interview "Vesti. Details".

From 2006 to 2012, after his final return to Moscow, Kiselyov was the host of the social and political talk show "National Interest" on the channel "Russia", later renamed "Russia-1". On July 3 and 10, 2010, within the framework of this program, from the Moscow side held a teleconference "Ukraine — Russia" together with the host of the "1+1" TV channel Nataliia Moseichuk.

In 2006–2008 Kiselyov hosted the evening edition of Vesti, paired with Maria Sittel, while the length of the program was increased from 30 to 50 minutes.

Since July 2008, he has been the Deputy General Director of the VGTRK holding; after the appointment, he left the Vesti program. On the Vesti FM radio station, which is part of the All-Russian State Television and Radio Broadcasting Company, until November 27, 2013, he hosted two author's programs — "Hot Spot" (2010–2013) and "Burn people's hearts with a verb" (2013). On September 9 and 16, 2011, he held an hour-long discussion of the TV series “Split” entitled “Parts of the Whole” on the TV channel “Culture”.

In March 2012, Kiselyov replaced Sergei Kurginyan in the Historical Process program. On September 9, 2012, he became the host of the Vesti Nedeli program. In 2010 and from January 2013 to the present, Kiselyov served as the permanent host of Christmas interviews with Patriarch Kirill on Russia-1. From September 19 to November 28, 2015, he hosted the quiz show "Knowledge is Power".

Author of a documentary series about the collapse of the USSR called "USSR: the collapse", as well as several documentaries: "Sakharov", "100 days of Gorbachev", "100 days of Yeltsin", "1/6 of the land", "The Great Russian Revolution", “Kurchatov's codes”, “Stop poisoning people. Cinema about wine” and others.

=== International news agency "Rossiya Segodnya" ===
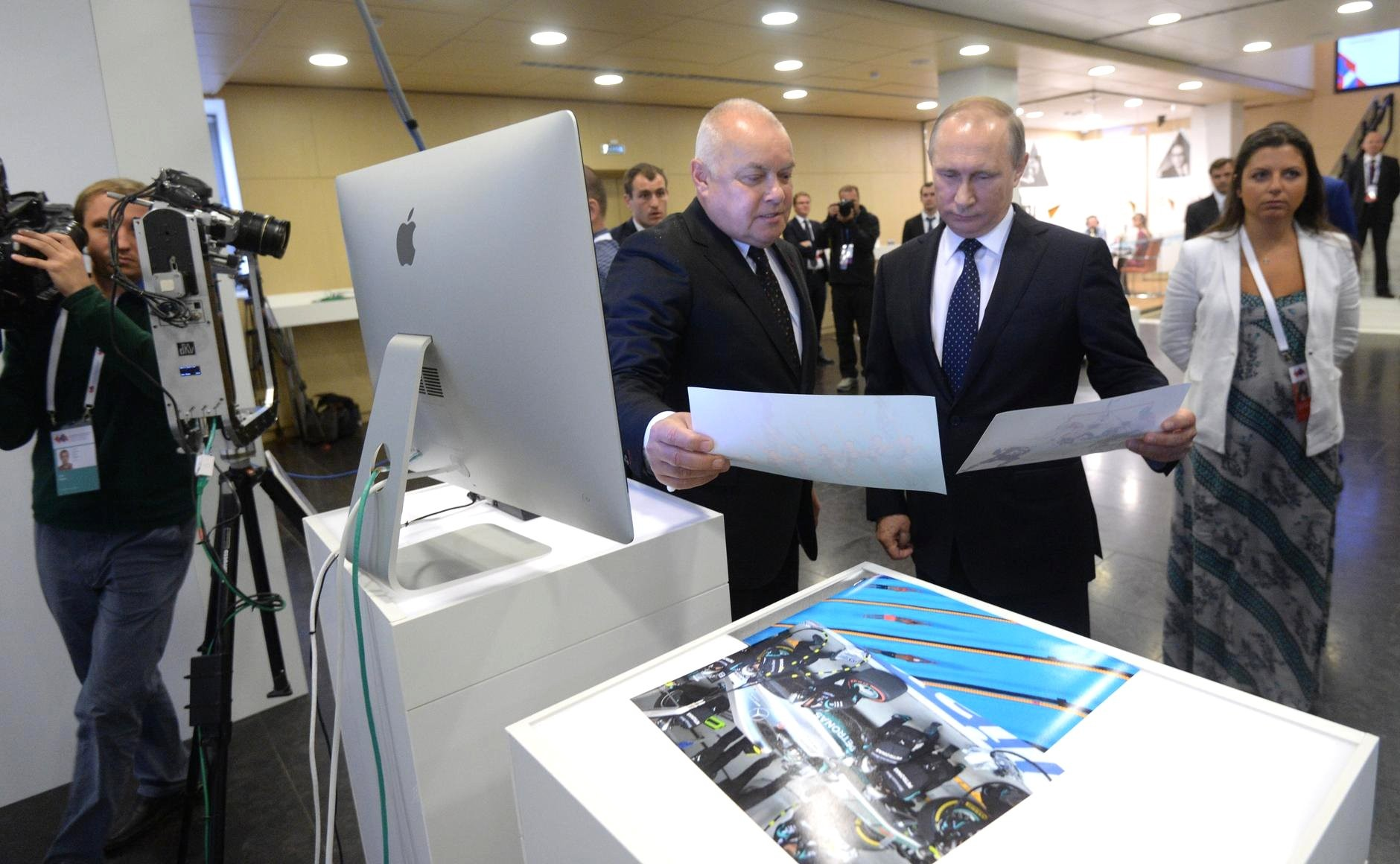
Kiselyov with Vladimir Putin and Margarita Simonyan on 7 June 2016

On December 9, 2013 it was announced that a new structure would be created on the basis of RIA Novosti — the International News Agency "Rossiya Segodnya". Dmitry Kiselyov was appointed its CEO. According to the presidential decree, the main task of the new agency will be "to cover the state policy of the Russian Federation and Russian public life abroad," and according to Kiselyov, the mission of his organization is "to restore a fair attitude towards Russia as an important country in the world with good intentions."

On April 9, 2014, the Broadcasting Board of Governors (BBG) announced that in a March 21 letter in response to a request to renew an expiring contract to broadcast Voice of America on 810 AM, Rossiya Segodnya Director Dmitry Kiselyov wrote only one sentence: "We will not cooperate." BBG head Jeff Schell said that the termination of the contract is "Moscow's pressure on the media space" and asked for "equal conditions", since the Russian media "enjoy open access to broadcasting in the US and around the world. Russian citizens deserve the same freedom of access to information.” He also stated that BBG will continue to work for the Russian audience on online platforms. The organization of broadcasting via satellite is also not excluded.

In April 2016, hackers announced the hacking and theft of the contents of two mailboxes and the WhatsApp correspondence of Dmitry Kiselyov, which was put up for auction until May 15. The period from 2009 to 2016 is covered with a total amount of information of 11 gigabytes. One of the accounts used was registered to the wife of Kiselyov Maria. The topic is mainly devoted to the projects "Rossiya Segodnya", also in the array there is data on finances and assets (including the purchase of an elite apartment of 204 m^{2} on Tsvetnoy Boulevard for 162 million rubles in February 2014), challenging the personal sanctions imposed by the EU, purchase of a finished diploma thesis and professional scholarly articles for the wife. Among the interlocutors of Kiselyov were Valentina Fedotova, head of the social philosophy sector of the Institute of Philosophy of the Russian Academy of Sciences (who writes the texts of the host on a paid basis), economist Nikita Krichevsky, media manager Aram Gabrelyanov, prankster Vovan, Minister of Culture Vladimir Medinsky.

== Activities and commentary ==
He is best known as the presenter of Vesti Nedeli (News of the Week), Russia-1's weekly news program. Kiselyov holds ultra-conservative views, in particular on homosexuality. His show is accused of being a soapbox to promote the Kremlin's policies, disparage homosexuality, denigrate the West and speculate about Western-led conspiracies as well as attack the political opposition to Putin.

Kiselyov has gained particular notice in the West for his commentary on gay people and statements made during the annexation of Crimea by the Russian Federation. Kiselyov considers himself a liberal, while questioning the liberal credentials of his rivals Sergey Parkhomenko and Alexei Navalny. Regarding Parkhomenko and Navalny, he has asked, "Why are they liberals? They are absolutely totalitarian people. I am a liberal, because I put up with them." Kiselyov has been described by The Economist as Russia's propagandist-in-chief, and in a piece entitled "Russian TV host: Russia is the only country with capability to turn U.S. into 'radioactive dust'". The Washington Post says:

He may seem extreme, but Kiselyov apparently has the blessing of the Kremlin: He's been selected to head the new Russian state media conglomerate, Rossiya Segodnya, which is due to replace the well-respected RIA Novosti. He also has a point. Russia is still a major nuclear power, with an estimated 8,500 nuclear warheads, more than the United States.

=== Praise of Stalin era ===
Kiselyov has lauded the Stalin era of the Soviet Union, arguing "there were many fewer problems than now. Drug addicts, homosexual marriages, and so on. These things have never been welcomed by Orthodoxy from the outset. I regard them as a Protestant-Lutheran compromise."

Both of Kiselyov's grandfathers were repressed by Stalin. One of them was executed during the Stalin era.

=== Homophobia ===
In one televised commentary, he said, "banning gays from distributing propaganda to children is not enough. I think they should be banned from donating blood or sperm, and if they die in a car crash, their hearts should be burnt or buried in the ground as unsuitable for the continuation of life", suggesting that the internal organs of gay people should be burned and buried rather than be accepted for organ transplants.

An online petition titled "No Fascism on TV" calling for him to be fired from the Russia 24 TV channel gathered over 3,500 signatures, and several bloggers called for his comments to be sanctioned under laws banning extremism and hate speech. However, Kiselyov refused to retract the statement, telling the Izvestia newspaper that "I'm not a homophobe. Lots of my friends are gay. It is simply global practice, as followed in the United States, the European Union, Japan, and Arab countries. Practically everywhere except Russia" he said, claiming that he just wanted Russia to become more "civilized" and join the United States, the European Union, Japan and the Arab world by prohibiting gay people from donating blood and other organs. He also incorrectly claimed that the Food and Drug Administration in the US kept a database of "everyone in the US who has had a same-sex sexual relation over the past twenty years, with the equivalent EU agency doing the same", according to The Moscow Times. Timothy Snyder writes in The New York Review of Books that "Kiselyov has taken Putin's campaign against gay rights and transformed it into a weapon against European integration." Concerning murders on the basis of the victim's homosexuality, he claimed that "they knowingly call for and provoke the situation in order to become victims" and that the society naturally counters their activities by "most variable, including brutal forms". Kiselyov has also condemned gay pride parades, and while he opposes same-sex marriage, he has been sympathetic to the idea of civil unions for same-sex couples.

=== Sweden ===
In Sweden, he gained media attention in December 2013 when he criticized the moral values of that country in response to the 2013 Ukrainian protests, for which he partly blamed the Swedish political leadership and Swedish foreign minister Carl Bildt as well as the government of Poland, accusing Poland and Sweden of fomenting the protests to avenge defeats in centuries-old Polish-Russian and Russo-Swedish Wars.

=== Ukraine ===
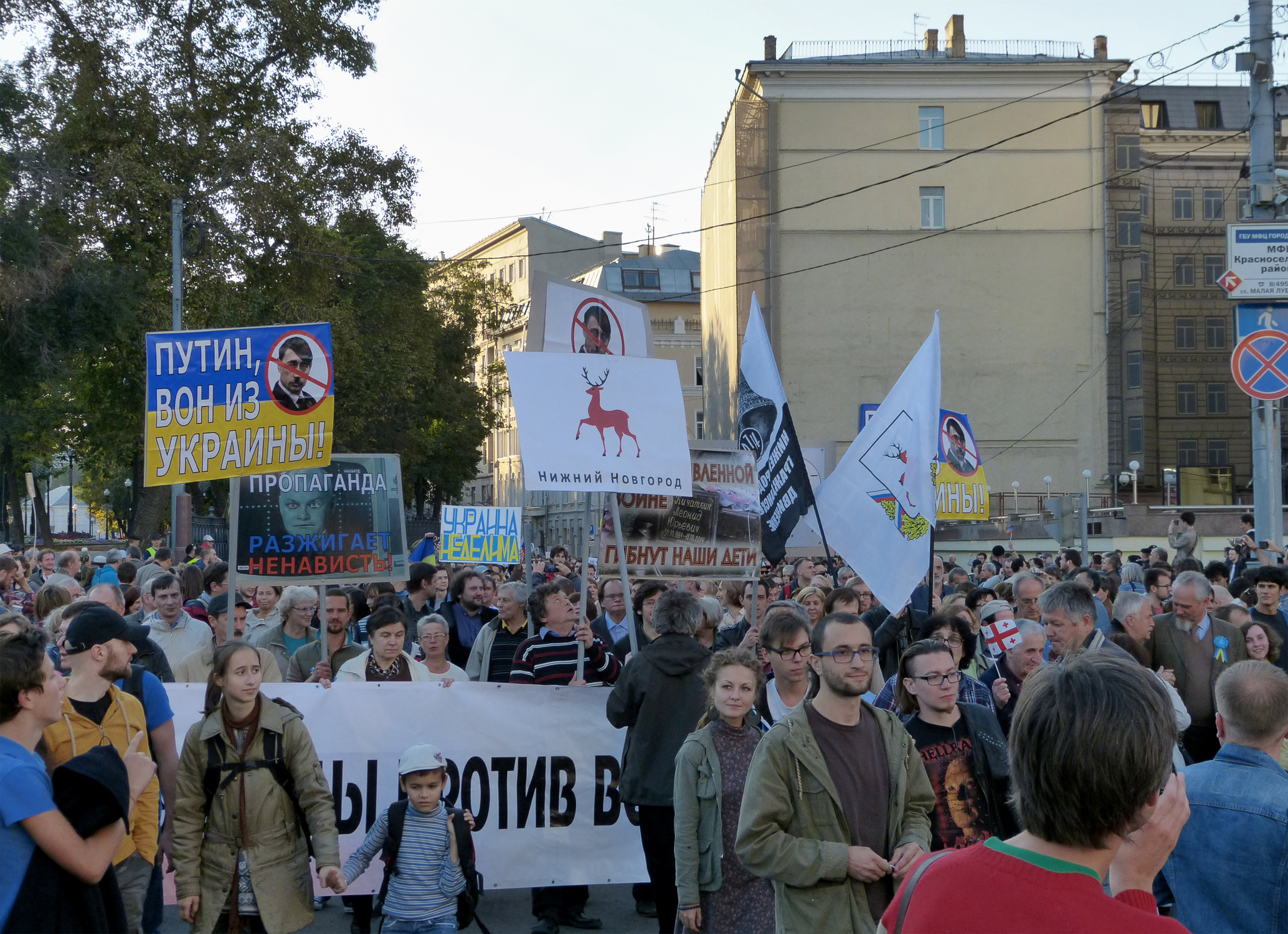
Anti-war protest in Moscow on 21 September 2014. Protester holds a cartoon showing Kiselyov.

Countries that banned Kiselyov from entering their territory (March 2015).

On May 15, 2014, Kiselyov said about the country, "There is no Ukraine. That is only a virtual concept, a virtual country. If you want to live in a virtual world, please do. ... But Ukraina.ru is a real portal. Not about the country, but about that territory which was under the rule of that country. Now it is a failed state." Ukraina.ru has been determined to be a state-sponsored fake news dissemination outlet by the EU's anti-disinformation East StratCom Task Force.

Dmitry Kiselyov being on the list for the first round of personal sanctions imposed on Russia by the EU in March 2014, in connection with the Russo-Ukrainian War, came as ″the biggest surprise″ to the international media. Since September 11, 2014, Kiselyov is banned from entering Ukraine.

He was sanctioned by the UK government in 2014 in relation to the Russo-Ukrainian War.

In 2016, he admitted that a document he had presented on his weekly Vesti Nedeli news show was fake. A week after presenting the identity of a Ukrainian officer in the Galician SS-Volunteer division, he "thanked the attentive audience for finding “inaccuracies” in the document and said it was fake".

=== Syria ===
In October 2015, Kiselyov was quoted as claiming that the US was fighting alongside the Islamic State of Iraq and Syria (ISIS) in Syria, saying: "In Syria, America stands on the side of the terrorist caliphate. Together they are trying to destroy Syria as a secular state." Kiselyov later blamed the Metrojet Flight 9268 crash on a secret pact between America and ISIS, and has said that if American bombers were to attack the Syrian army, then "We'll shoot them down". He also said that "imprudent behavior" towards Russia in retaliation for its actions in the war may lead to "nuclear" consequences.

=== 2014 "radioactive dust" threat ===
On March 16, 2014, against the backdrop of the Crimean referendum held a day prior, Kiselyov commented in his weekly news program Vesti Nedeli (News of the Week) in the context of his presentation about Vladimir Putin being a stronger leader than U.S. president Barack Obama before stating that "Russia is the only country in the world that is truly capable of turning the USA into radioactive dust." He also suggested that that was the reason why Obama's hair had been turning grey. Vladimir Putin in October 2016 replied to a question about Kiselyov's "radioactive dust" remark by saying that nuclear saber-rattling was "harmful rhetoric"; the Q&A exchange was shortly afterwards commented on by Kiselyov in his program, in which he elaborated on what Putin actually said.

=== 2016 US presidential election ===
Kiselyov described the 2016 United States presidential election as "the dirtiest campaign in the history of the United States", and that "It has been so revoltingly foul that there is real disgust at the fact that ... they still talk of democracy in America". He also repeated unfounded allegations of electoral fraud throughout the election, claiming that they made 1990s electoral fraud in Russia look like "simple child's play in comparison". Following the election of Donald Trump as the president-elect, Kiselyov initially praised Trump as an "anti-establishment" candidate, welcoming his readiness to co-operate with Putin. However, in early 2017, Kiselyov reversed course and stopped praising Trump, claiming that he was "more dangerous and unpredictable than North Korean leader Kim Jong Un."

=== 2022 United Kingdom nuclear threats ===
On May 1, 2022, Kiselyov publicly threatened Prime Minister of the United Kingdom Boris Johnson with nuclear annihilation on his Sunday night news show claiming without credible evidence the United Kingdom and Ireland could be "plunged into the sea" and turned into a "radioactive wasteland" by a single Russian underwater nuclear strike. A week after his nuclear threat, Kiselyov was pictured at the five-star Jumeirah Al Qasr hotel in Dubai with his eighth wife.

=== 2025 Armenia ===
On January 12, 2025, Russian ambassador in Armenia Sergey Kopyrkin was summoned to the Ministry of Foreign Affairs of Armenia due to a set of statements made by Kiselyov in his Vesti Nedeli TV program. The Armenian government expressed concern over the program's content, which it described as containing "artificially generated narratives" aimed at undermining the sovereignty and territorial integrity of Armenia. Mkhitar Hayrapetian, the Armenian Minister of High-Tech Industry, informed reporters that the airing of Kiselyov's program could face a potential block within Armenia.

== Personal life ==
He has been married several times. By the age of 22, he had already been married three times. He was criticized for his numerous marriages by the Communist Party. Kiselyov has said that the party blocked his career in the final years of the Soviet Union due to the numerous marriages.

He is religious and a strong supporter of Patriarch Kirill of Moscow.

== Awards ==
- Order of Friendship (2011)
- Order "For Merit to the Fatherland" 4th class (2014)
- Order of St. Sergius of Radonezh 2nd degree (Russian Orthodox Church, 2014)
