= Yuri Levitan =

Soviet radio announcer (1914–1983)

- Юрий Левитан
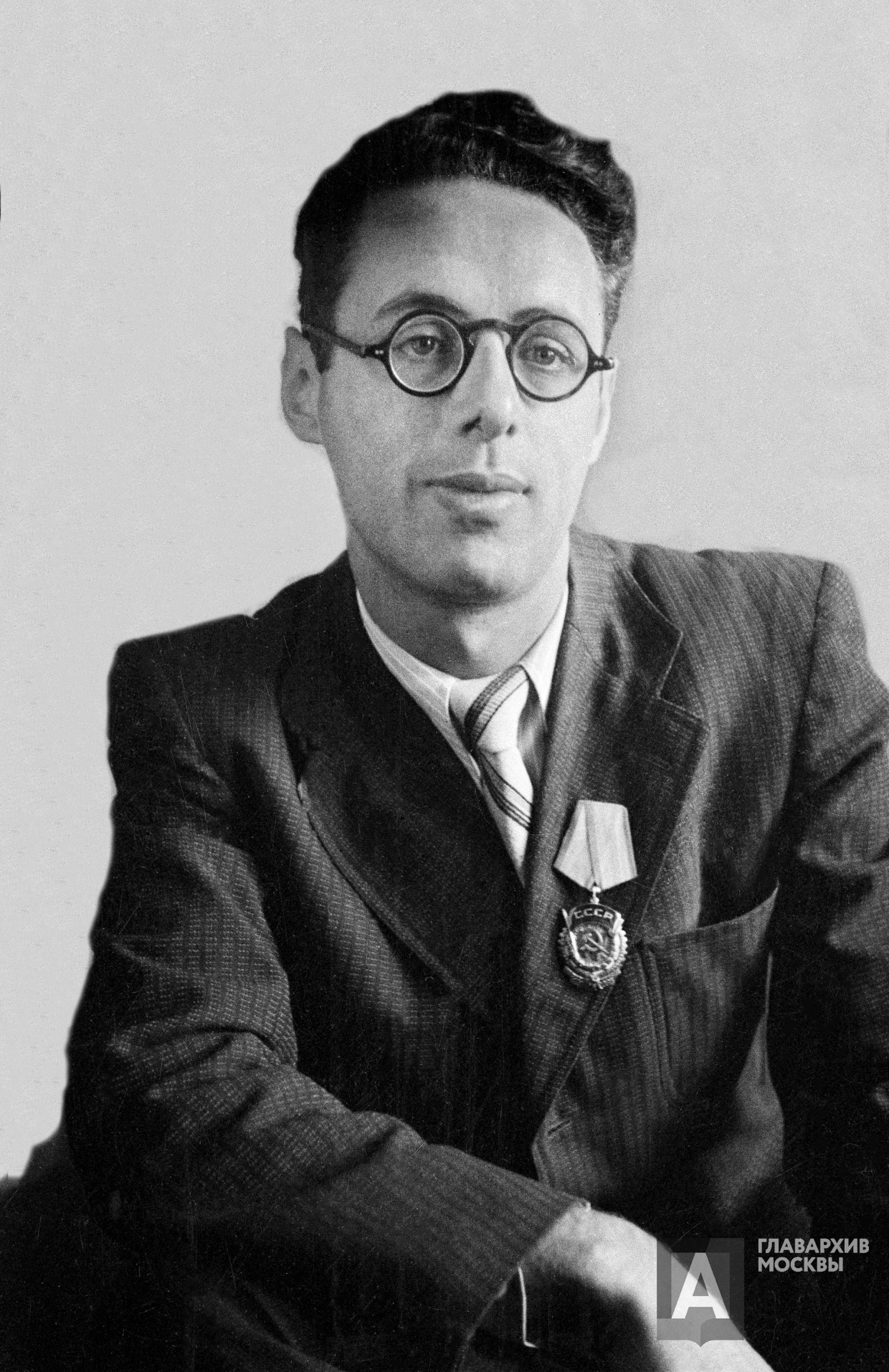
- Levitan in 1944
- Born: 2 October 1914; Vladimir, Russia
- Died: 4 August 1983 (aged 68); Bessonovka, Belgorod Oblast, Soviet Union
- Occupation: Radio announcer

A characteristic wartime announcement by Levitan on 8 May 1945

Yuri Borisovich Levitan (Note: Also transliterated as Yury) (Russian: Юрий Борисович Левитан; 2 October 1914 – 4 August 1983) was the primary Soviet radio announcer during and after World War II. He announced on Radio Moscow all major international events in the 1940s–60s including the German attack on the Soviet Union on 22 June 1941, the surrender of Germany on 9 May 1945, the death of Joseph Stalin on 5 March 1953, and the first manned spaceflight on 12 April 1961.

== Biography ==
Born in a Jewish family in Vladimir to a tailor and a housewife, Levitan traveled to Moscow in the early 1930s, hoping to become an actor, and was rejected because of his provincial accent. He secured a position on a Moscow radio station owing to his characteristic deep voice. In January 1934, after hearing Levitan broadcasting, Joseph Stalin called up the radio station and requested that from then on Levitan read his announcements. Consequently, Levitan became the personal announcer for Stalin and the leading Soviet radio personality.

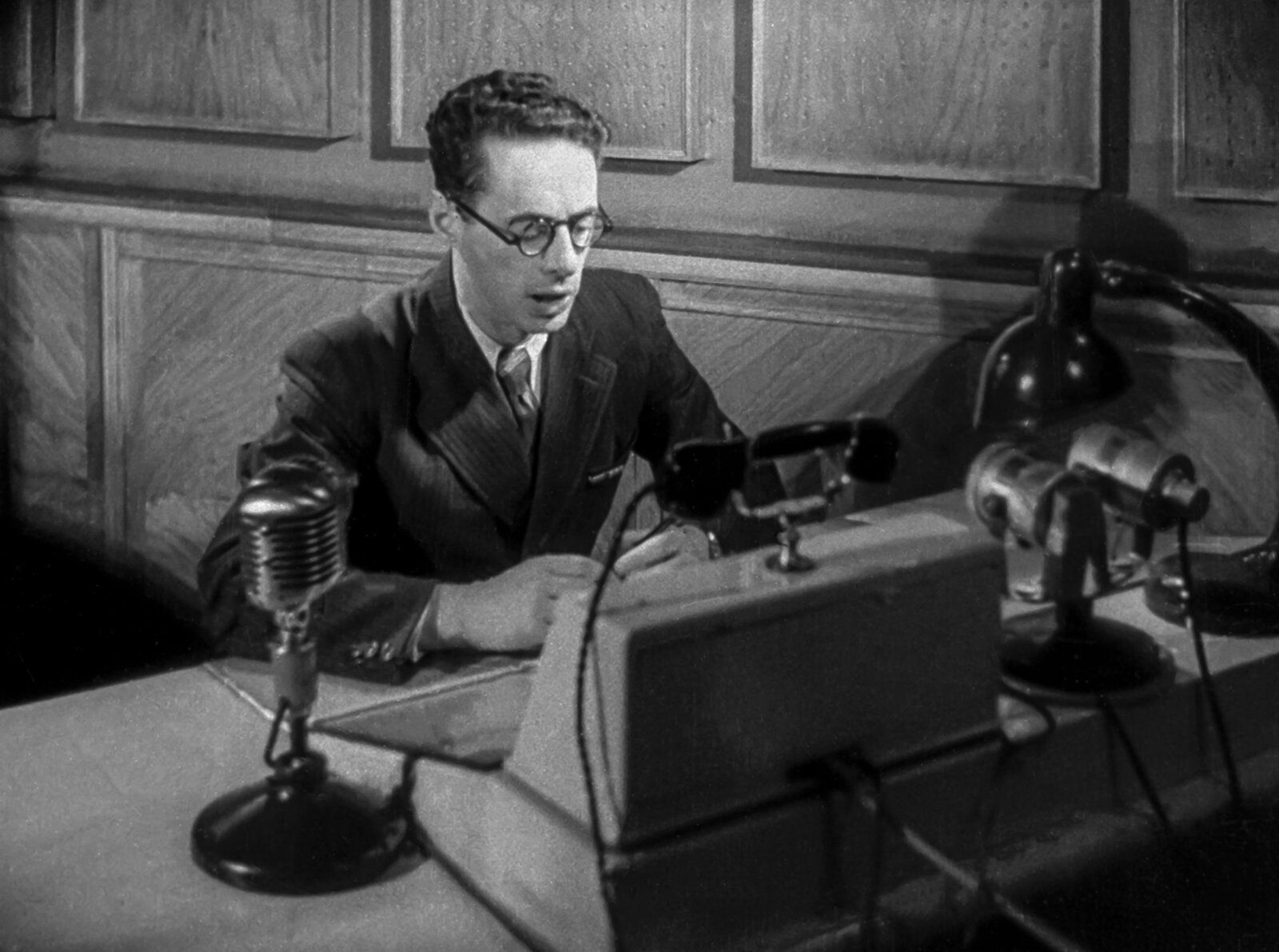
Levitan reading out Germany's unconditional surrender, May 9, 1945

After the German invasion (22 June 1941) Levitan was evacuated (autumn 1941) to Sverdlovsk, as Moscow radio stations were taken down to avoid German bombardment. At the time he lived in a secret location due to his importance as the nation's foremost radio personality. In March 1943 he was secretly transported to Kuybyshev, where the Soviet radio committee met.

During his years away from Moscow, his reports began with his trademark "Attention, this is Moscow speaking!" (Russian: Внимание, говорит Москва!, romanized: Vnimanie, govorit Moskva!) Levitan made some 2000 radio announcements during the war; he recorded recreations of many of them in the 1950s, when he reproduced them in studio for archiving purposes.

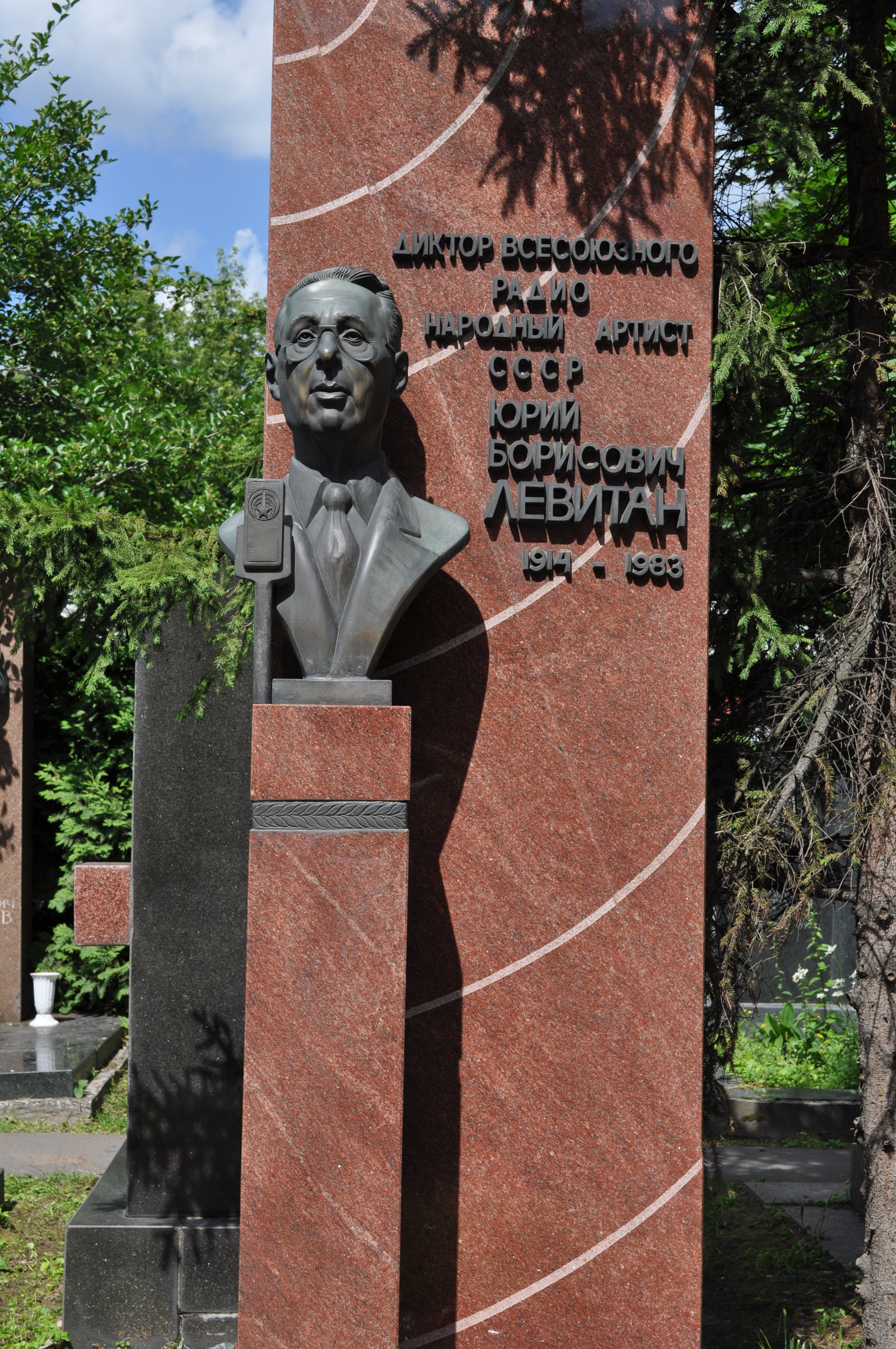
Yuri Levitan's monument at Novodevichy Cemetery.

After the war Levitan reported events in the Red Square and state proclamations. Between 1978 and 1983 he announced the annual "Minute of Silence" to commemorate Victory Day in the Soviet Union. In 1980 he was awarded the title of People's Artist of the USSR. He died from a heart attack in 1983, and was buried in Novodevichy Cemetery in Moscow.

== Legacy ==
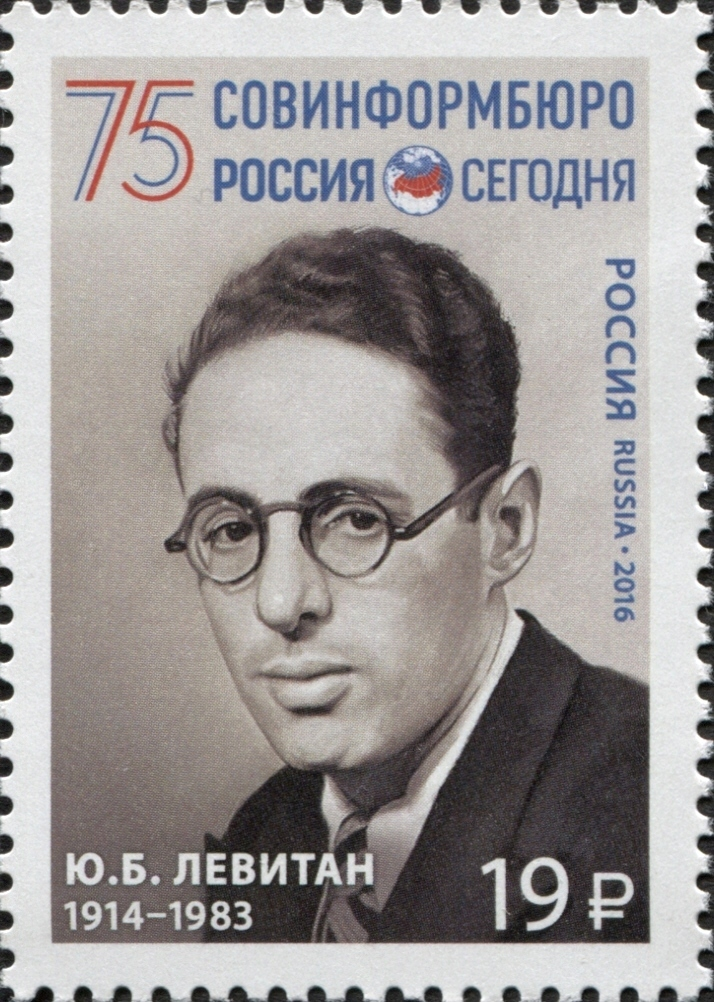
Levitan on a 2016 stamp of Russia

In Vladimir, the birth town of Levitan, there is a street named after him and a monument of Levitan. His monuments were also erected at his grave in Moscow, and in Volgograd, and streets were named after him in Almaty, Dnipro, Odesa, Orsk, Tver and Ufa. An Aeroflot passenger plane and a container cargo ship carry his name.

== See also ==
- Hans Fritzsche, German counterpart during World War II
