= All-Slavic Anti-Fascist Committee =

Anti-fascist public organization

The All-Slavic Anti-Fascist Committee, later known as the All-Slavic Committee of the Soviet Union, was an anti-fascist public organization established in Moscow in 1941 during the Second World War. Its main task was to unite all Slavs in the fight against Nazism and fascism. Throughout its history, the committee was led by the Soviet Lieutenant General of the Engineering Troops Aleksandr Gundorov.

== History ==
In July 1941, Aleksandr Shcherbakov received a proposal from emigrants from Slavic countries living in the USSR to create an “All-Slavic Committee”. This idea was approved by Joseph Stalin.

=== World War II ===
The committee was created on October 5, 1941, at the constituent assembly of representatives of the Slavic peoples living in the USSR. The main goal of the committee during the war years was the formation of an anti-fascist movement in the Slavic countries and the organization of its support among the Slavic communities in allied and neutral states. From 1942, the Committee published the magazine Slavs.

The committee's work was carried out by holding all-Slavic anti-fascist rallies and radio rallies (more than 70 in 1943–44), publishing and distributing propaganda documents (more than 20,000 articles and various materials were sent abroad in 1942–46), and organizing weekly Slavic radio broadcasts. countries, maintaining ties with Slavic organizations in the United States, Canada, Great Britain, Australia, Latin America. At the end of 1945, the committee maintained ties with 130 foreign Slavic organizations. With the liberation of the Slavic countries from fascist occupation, they formed national Slavic committees.

=== Post-War ===
In 1947 Committee was reorganized into the Slavic Committee of the USSR.

In 1949, the financing of the committee was almost halved compared to 1947–1948, but in 1950 the committee was allocated more money, since a team (more than 20 people) of the anti-Tito newspaper of Yugoslav emigrants Za socijalističku Jugoslaviju ('For Socialist Yugoslavia') was assigned to it. Thus, the Committee became involved in the anti-Tito informbiro period.

In 1951, the staff of the committee were reduced. From that point the main activity of the committee was the publication of the magazine Slavs.

In May 1958, the Central Committee of the CPSU decided to close the Slavs magazine. After the closure of the magazine Slavs the staff of the committee was reduced, and its activities were reduced to the reception of foreign tourists.

=== Closure ===
In March 1962, the staff of the committee was reduced to 1 person, which in fact was its closure. Formally, the committee was not liquidated until the death of Gundorov.

== Committee Founders ==
Among committee founders were prominent figures such as: Dmitry Shostakovich, Zdeněk Nejedlý, Oleksandr Korniychuk, Pavlo Tychyna, Alexander Dovzhenko, Anatoly Lavrentyev, Alexey Tolstoy, Yanka Kupała, Yakub Kolas, Alexander Fadeev, Wanda Wasilewska, Władysław Broniewski, Leon Chwistek, Óndra Łysohorsky and others.
