= Voice of Russia =

1993–2014 Russian governmental international radio station

- Type: Radio network
- Country: Russia

Ownership
- Owner: Rossiya Segodnya (since 9 December 2013); All-Russia State Television and Radio Company (previously)

History
- Launch date: 22 December 1993; 32 years ago
- Closed: 9 November 2014; 11 years ago
- Replaced by: Sputnik
- Former names: Radio Moscow

Coverage
- Availability: International

Links
- Website: rus.ruvr.ru (inactive)

Voice of Russia (Russian: Голос России, romanized: Golos Rossii), commonly abbreviated VOR, was the Russian government's international radio broadcasting service from 1993 until 2014, when it was reorganised as Radio Sputnik. Its interval signal was a chime version of 'Majestic' chorus from the Great Gate of Kiev portion of Pictures at an Exhibition by Mussorgsky.

== History ==
Russian president Boris Yeltsin issued a decree on 22 December 1993 which reorganised Radio Moscow under a new name: Voice of Russia.

In March 2013, the Voice of Russia and the People's Daily Online signed a news sharing agreement as CCP General Secretary Xi Jinping and Russian president Vladimir Putin presided. On 9 December 2013, Russian president Vladimir Putin issued a presidential decree dissolving the Voice of Russia as an agency, and merging it with RIA Novosti to form the Rossiya Segodnya international news agency.

Margarita Simonyan, editor-in-chief of the Rossiya Segodnya, said in March 2014 that "We will stop using obsolete radio broadcasting models, when the signal is transmitted without any control and when it is impossible to calculate who listens to it and where." The Voice of Russia ceased shortwave and European mediumwave radio broadcasts on 1 April 2014. The service continued to be available worldwide via the internet, in selected regions on satellite, and in several cities on FM, AM (in North America) or local digital radio.

== Broadcast languages ==
By 2013, the Voice of Russia had been broadcasting in 38 languages, including:

- Albanian
- Armenian
- Arabic
- Azerbaijani
- Bengali
- Bulgarian
- Chinese
- Crimean Tatar
- Czech
- Dari
- English
- French
- German
- Hausa
- Hindi
- Hungarian
- Italian
- Japanese
- Kurdish
- Kyrgyz
- Mongolian
- Norwegian
- Pashto
- Persian
- Polish
- Portuguese
- Romanian
- Russian
- Serbian
- Spanish
- Turkish
- Ukrainian
- Urdu
- Uzbek
