= Russian Federation Today =

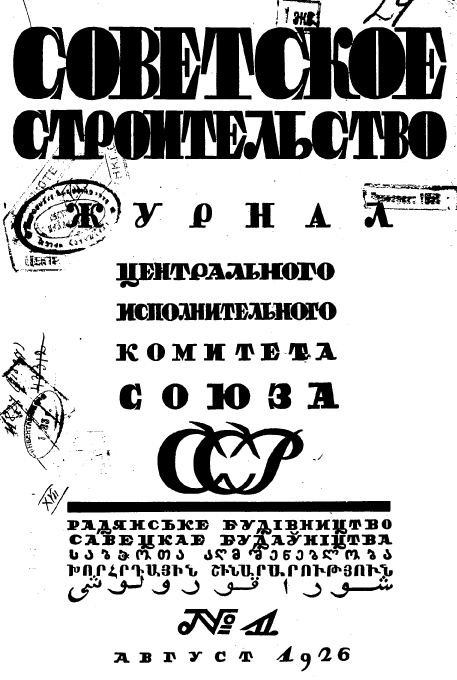
Cover of the first issue (August, 1926)

Russian Federation Today (Russian: Российская Федерация сегодня, transliteration: Rossiyskaya Federatsiya Segodnya or Rossijskaja Federacija Segodnja) is a Russian language semi-monthly magazine currently founded by the Federal Assembly (Parliament of the Russian Federation: State Duma and Federal Council) and published by the Russian Federation Today Autonomous Nonprofit Organization.

== History and profile ==
Russian Federation Today was founded in 1926 as Soviet Formation (Russian: Советское строительство, transliteration: Sovetskoye Stroitelstvo or Sovetskoje Stroitel'stvo, lit. Formation of Soviets) by the Central Executive Committee of the Soviet Union.
