= Committee of Youth Organisations =

Public organization in the Soviet Union

The Committee of the Soviet Youth Organizations or USSR Youth Organization Committee (Russian: Комитет молодёжных организаций СССР (КМО СССР)) was a public organization in the Soviet Union primarily in the field of international youth relations. It was established in 1956 on the basis of the Anti-Fascist Committee of the Soviet Youth (1941-1956). It united various civic, professional, sports, student, cultural, etc. organizations of the Soviet youth.

== Committee chairmen ==
- Yevgeny Fyodorov (1941-?)
- Vyacheslav Kochemasov (1949-1954) - Chairman of the Anti-Fascist Committee of Soviet Youth
- Sergey Romanovsky (May 1954 - February 1960) - Chairman of the Anti-Fascist Committee of Soviet Youth until 1956
- Petr Reshetov (February 1960 - 1966)
- Vladimir Yarovoy (May 1966 - February 1968)
- Gennady Yanayev (March 1968 - January 1980)
- Aksyonov, Vladimir Alexandrovich (January 1980 - April 1987)
- Sergey Chelnokov (April 1987 - May 1989) - Chairman of the International Committee of Youth Organizations (ICMO), which succeeded the USSR KMO
- Alexey Kovylov (1989–1991)
- Alexey Koshmarov (Trubetskoy) (1991–2016) - Chairman of the International Committee of Youth Organizations (ICMO), the assignee of the USSR KMO.
