= Marian Kałuski =

Polish-Australian journalist, writer, historian and traveler

- Born: February 2, 1946 (age 80); Chełmno, Republic of Poland

Marian Kałuski (born in 1946 in Chełmno) - Polish-Australian journalist, writer, historian and traveler (visited 90 countries).

== Biography ==
He has been living in Australia since 1964. He studies Poles' history in Australia and the world, Polish-Jewish relations and Poles in the Kresy.

In 1974-1977, he was the editor of "Tygodnik Polski"; Together with Dr. Zbigniew Stelmach in 1974, he saved the magazine from liquidation (the magazine has been published to this day and is the only Polish weekly in Australia). He has published or publishes, inter alia, in "Wiadomości Polskie", "Przegląd Katolicki", "Kultura", "Wiadomości", "Dziennik Polski", "Dziennik Żołnierza", "Tygodnik Polski", "Orle Biały" and "Gazeta Niedzielna", "Pisarze.pl", "Tygiel" and "KWORUM. Polish-Polish Internet Gazeta".

Co-founder of the Study of the History of the Australian Polonia, which he has been managing since 1977. Thanks to his efforts, Australia Post issued a postage stamp in 1983 commemorating Paweł Edmund Strzelecki's contribution to Australia.

He is a member of the Australian Historical Society, the Australian Writers' Union and the Association of Australian Journalists, and the Australian-Chinese Friendship Society. He was a founder of the Polish-Australian Historical Society.

In 1990, he was awarded the Cross of Merit by the Polish government-in-exile. The decoration was presented in 1991 on behalf of President Lech Wałęsa, in 2006 with the Silver Medal of the "Polish Community" Association in Warsaw, and in 2018, for the centenary of Poland regaining independence, with the Order of the Cross of Polonia of the World Research Council for the Polish Diaspora (Warsaw).

== Personal views ==
About his book Litwa Kowieńska – tam była Polska (whose title translates to "Kaunas Lithuania - Poland was there"), which he released in 2021, Marian Kałuski writes many things. For example, in his own words:

Sowing by Lithuanian nationalists among Lithuanians a straightforward hatred of Poland and Poles and everything that is Polish was certainly a phenomenon in the history of not only Europe, but also the world. This is because until 1918, Poles and Lithuanians were brothers and Poles did not give Lithuanians any reason to hate them. You can look for the hand of Satan in it, otherwise it cannot be explained in any logical way. Lithuanians became his instrument in sowing hatred between nations. Personally, as a Catholic, I am amazed at the great role of the Lithuanian Catholic Church in this satanic work!

Furthermore, he states that

The second goal of the book is to show how Lithuanian nationalists - exceptionally stiff enemies of Poland, Poles and everything that is Polish for over a hundred years (in fact almost all Lithuanians) since 1918...

The Australian Jewish writer and physician Serge Liberman describes some of Kałuski's journalistic writings as "vehemently antagonistic to Jews and to Israel".

About his book W podzięce i ku pamięci Jankielom. Mały leksykon Żydów-patriotów polskich (whose title translates to “In Gratitude and in Memory of the Jankiels. A Small Lexicon of Polish-Jewish Patriots”) which was released in Warsaw in 2001, Marian Kaluski writes the following:

“Polish–Jewish relations after the Second World War have never been easy. Anyone familiar with the history of Jews in Poland and with the history of Polish–Jewish relations (unfortunately, such people are few) must conclude that the current crisis is one great misunderstanding — on both sides. We should no longer tolerate this situation. In the interest of both nations, we ought to strive for an improvement in Polish–Jewish relations.”

Furthermore, in his books “The Poles in Australia” (Melbourne 1985) and “Polacy w Chinach” (Polish people in China, Warsaw 2001) he wrote in a friendly way separate chapters about Polish Jews in these countries [5].

== Published books ==
- Jan Paweł II. Pierwszy Polak papieżem [Pope John Paul II. The first Polish Pope] (in Polish). Melbourne: Towarzystwo Przyjaciół KUL. 1979.
- Jan Paweł II. Pierwszy Polak papieżem (in Polish) (Uzupełnione ed.). Philadelphia, USA: Promyk. 1980.
- Sir Paul E. Strzelecki. The man who climbed and named Mt. Kosciusko. Melbourne: SHPA. 1981.
- Poles in Maitland - Polacy w Maitland. Maitland. 1983.
- The Poles in Australia. Melbourne: AE Press. 1985.
- Sir Paul E. Strzelecki. A Polish Count's Explorations in 19th Century Australia. Melbourne: AE Press. 1985.
- Litwa 600-lecie chrześcijaństwa 1387-1987 [Lithuania 600 years of Christianity 1387-1987] (in Polish). London: Veritas. 1987.
- Ukraiński zamach na Polskie Sanktuarium Narodowe pod Monte Cassino (ZZW RP Melbourne 1987),
- Ukraiński zamach na Polskie Sanktuariam Narodowe pod Monte Cassino (z obszernym tłumaczeniem na angielski, Koło Lwowian w Londynie 1989),
- Wypełniali przykazanie miłosierdzia. Polski Kościół i polscy katolicy wobec holocaustu (von borowiecky Warszawa 2000),
- Cienie, które dzielą. Zarys stosunków polsko-żydowskich na Ziemi Drohobyckiej (von borowiecky Warszawa 2000),
- W podzięce i ku pamięci Jankielom. Mały leksykon żydów-patriotów polskich (von borowiecky 2001),
- Polacy w Chinach (Pax, Warszawa 2001),
- Polskie dzieje Gdańska do 1945 roku (Bernardinum, Pelplin 2004),
- Polska-Chiny 1246-1996. Szkice z dziejów wzajemnych kontaktów (Verbinum, Warszawa 2004),
- Polacy w Nowej Zelandii (Oficyna Wydawnicza Kucharski, Toruń 2006),
- śladami Polaków po świecie (CD-ROM, Polonicum Machindex Institut, Fryburg, Szwajcaria 2008; articles about Poles in 64 countries on 1570 pages).
- Polonia katolicka w Australii (Oficyna Wydawnicza Kucharski, Toruń 2010),
- Polski Centralny Ośrodek Społeczno-Sportowy w Albion 1984-2009 (Oficyna Wydawnicza Kucharski, Toruń 2010),
- Polish Community and Sporting Centre in Albion (Melbourne) 1984-2009 (Oficyna Wydawnicza Kucharski, Toruń 2010),
- Polskie dzieje Kijowa (Oficyna Wydawnicza Kucharski, Toruń 2015),
- Włochy - druga ojczyzna Polaków. Powiązania Polski i Polaków z Rzymem, Watykanem, Florencją i Wenecją (Oficyna Wydawnicza Kucharski, Toruń 2016),
- Polacy w Indiach i powiązania polsko-indyjskie (Oficyna Wydawnicza Kucharski, Toruń 2016),
- Sprawy kresowe bez cenzury. Tom 1 (Oficyna Wydawnicza Kucharski, Toruń-Melbourne 2017, ISBN 978-83-64232-20-6, 664 pages),
- Polska Italia, czyli śladem Polaków i poloników w Italii oraz powiązań polsko-włoskich (Oficyna „Aurora” Warszawa 2017, ISBN 978-83-65193-10-0),
- W obronie dobrego imienia Polski i Polaków. W 2018 r. Polska utraciła niepodległość i suwerenność (Oficyny Wydawnicza Kucharski, Melbourne 2018, ISBN 978-83-64232-30-5),
- Sprawy kresowe bez cenzury. Tom 2 (Oficyna Wydawnicza Kucharski, Toruń-Melbourne 2018, ISBN 978-83-64232-26-8, 690 pages),
- Sprawy kresowe bez cenzury. Tom III (Oficyna Wydawnicza Kucharski, Toruń-Melbourne 2018, ISBN 978-83-64232-32-9, 687 pages),
- Sprawy kresowe bez cenzury. Tom IV (Oficyna Wydawnicza Kucharski, Toruń-Melbourne 2018, ISBN 978-83-64232-35-0, 771 pages),
- Polskie Wilno 1919 - 1939 (Oficyna Wydawnicza Kucharski, Toruń-Melbourne 2019, ISBN 978-83-64232-36-7),
- Terra Australis. Przyczynki do historii Polaków w Australii, Studium Historii Polonii Australijskiej, Melbourne 2019, ISBN 978-83-64232-42-8, 421 pages).
- Litwa Kowieńska - tam była Polska. Polski słownik geograficzno-historyczno-biograficzny Litwy Kowieńskiej (Toruń-Melbourne 2021)
- Słownik zasłużonych i znanych Polaków urodzonych we Lwowie, Oficyna Wydawnicza Kucharski, Melbourne-Toruń 2021, ISBN 978-83-64232-55-08,
- Japonia - kraj daleki, a jakże nam bliski. Polacy w Japonii i powiązania polsko-japońskie, Wydawnictwo Werset, Lublin-Melbourne 2024, ISBN 978-83-67951-08-1
- Polski świat, czyli Polacy na świecie i powiązania Polski ze światem, Wprowadzenie Prof. dr Andrzej Targowski, Western Michigan University (USA), Tom 1, Oficyna Wydawnicza Kucharski, Melbourne-Toruń 2025, ISBN 978-83-64232-78-7
- Polski świat, czyli Polacy na świecie i powiązania Polski ze światem, Tom 2, Oficyna Wydawnicza Kucharski, Melbourne-Toruń 2025, ISBN 978-83-64232-79-4
- Polski świat, czyli Polacy na świecie i powiązania Polski ze światem, Tom 3, Oficyna Wydawnicza Kucharski, Melbourne-Toruń 2025, ISBN 978-83-64232-80-0
- Polski świat, czyli Polacy na świecie i powiązania Polski ze światem, Tom 4, Oficyna Wydawnicza Kucharski, Melbourne-Toruń 2026, ISBN 978-83-64232-81-7
- Unicestwianie Polaków i polskości w Wilnie i na Wileńszczyźnie przez Litwinów w latach 1939-2024, Oficyna Wydawnicza Kucharski, Melbourne-Toruń 2026, ISBN 978-83-64232-85-5 [4]
