= Rossiya Segodnya =

Russian state-controlled media group

Coordinates: 55°44′15.38″N 37°35′24.92″E

Federal State Unitary Enterprise MIA "Russia Today"

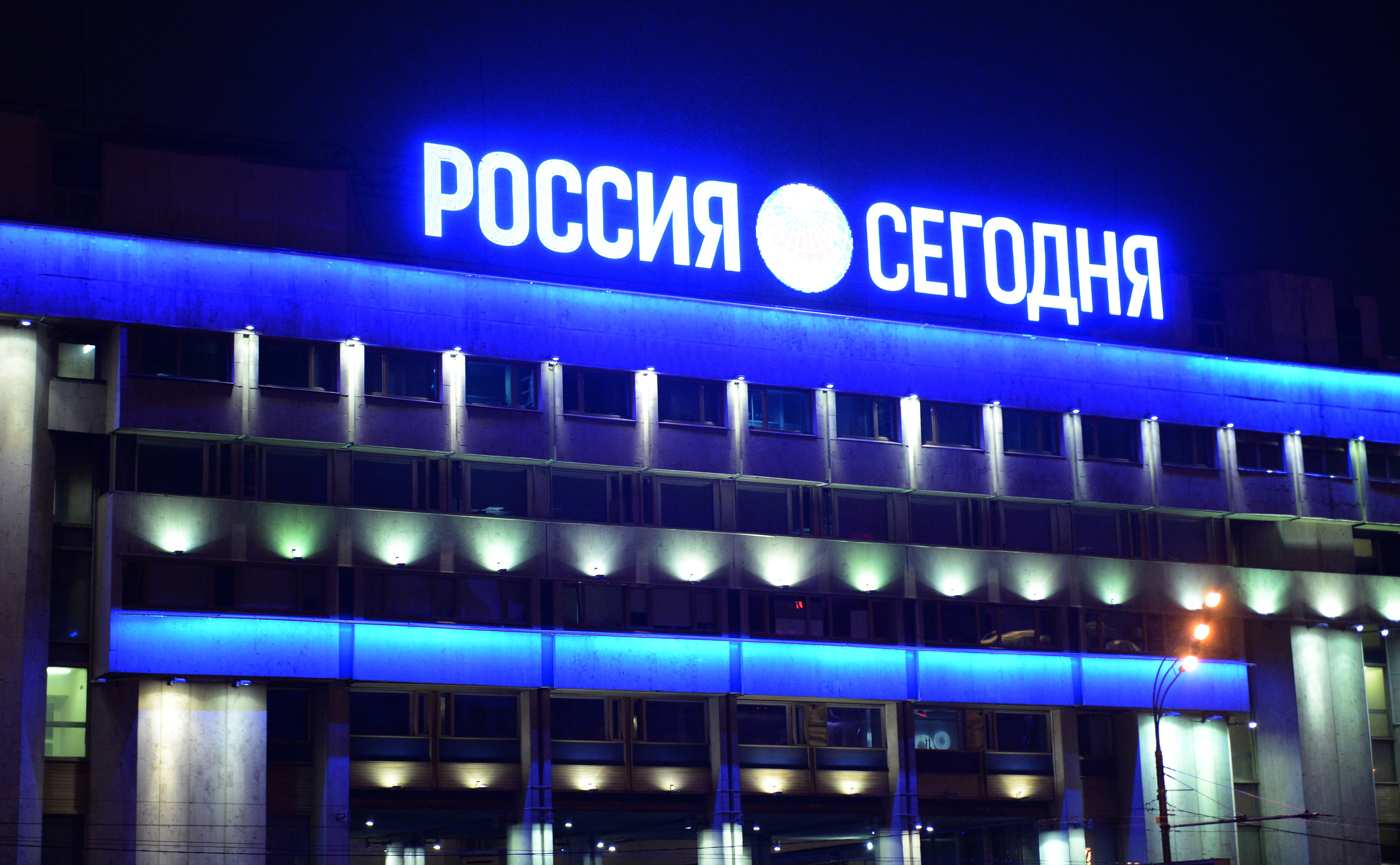
- Native name: Федеральное государственное унитарное предприятие «Международное информационное агентство „Россия сегодня“»
- Romanized name: Federal'noye gosudarstvennoye unitarnoye predpriyatiye "Mezhdunarodnoye informatsionnoye agentstvo 'Rossiya segodnya'"
- Formerly: RIA Novosti
- Type: Federal State Unitary Enterprise
- Industry: State media
- Predecessor: RIA Novosti
- Founded: 9 December 2013
- Headquarters: Zubovsky Boulevard 4, Moscow, Russia
- Key people: Dmitry Kiselyov; Margarita Simonyan
- Products: Wire service, international radio, internet website
- Owner: Federal Government of Russia
- Subsidiaries: Sputnik; RIA Novosti inoSMI; 1prime.ru
- Website: rossiyasegodnya.com

Rossiya Segodnya (Russian: Россия сегодня, IPA: [rɐˈsʲijə sʲɪˈvodʲnʲə], lit. 'Russia Today') is a media group owned and operated by the Russian government, created on the basis of RIA Novosti. The group owns and operates Sputnik, RIA Novosti, inoSMI and several other entities. The head of the organisation is Dmitry Kiselyov. Margarita Simonyan is the chief editor.

== History ==
Rossiya Segodnya incorporates the former RIA Novosti news service and the international radio service Voice of Russia (formerly Radio Moscow). According to the Decree of the President of Russia on 9 December 2013, the mandate of the new agency is to "provide information on Russian state policy and Russian life and society for audiences abroad." Vladimir Putin's chief of staff, Sergei Ivanov, said that Rossiya Segodnya was being created in order to increase the cost efficiency in Russian state media. However, RIA Novosti's own report about the move speculated it was an attempt to consolidate state control over the media sector and The Guardian news outlet stated that this was also a move by Putin to propagate a more pleasant image of Russia abroad.

According to a report on the RT news channel, Rossiya Segodnya is "in no way related" to the RT news channel despite the similarity in name (RT was known as Russia Today prior to its rebranding in 2009). However, a report by the BBC states that it "seems likely [...] that [Rossiya Segodnya] will complement the work of the state-funded foreign-language TV station, RT." On 31 December 2013, Margarita Simonyan was appointed editor-in-chief of the news agency, as well as being RT's news channel editor-in-chief. She will serve in both positions concurrently.

On 10 November 2014, the agency launched the Sputnik multimedia platform with Radio Sputnik as its audio component, replacing the Voice of Russia. The radio service is available internationally on FM, digital DAB/DAB+ (Digital Radio Broadcasting), HD-Radio, as well as mobile phones and the Internet. Within Russia itself, Rossiya Segodnya continues to use the RIA Novosti brand as its Russian-language news agency using the website ria.ru.

In 2015 Rossiya Segondya received 6.48 billion rubles from the state budget. Following his transfer from Ukraine to Russia on 7 September 2019 as part of the Ukraine-Russia prisoner exchanges, Kirill Vyshinsky became the executive director of Rossiya Segodnya on 9 September 2019.

== Subsidiaries ==
The following subsidiaries and projects are part of Rossiya Segodnya:

- Sputnik, includes Radio Sputnik
- RIA Novosti, includes RIA Novosti Sport and RIA Novosti Realty
- inoSMI (inosmi.ru), a news aggregator
- Ukraina.ru, a state-sponsored disinformation website about Ukraine
- Baltnews (previously baltnews.lv, baltnews.ee, baltnews.lt, now baltnews.com), a news website about the Baltic Region
- Prime (1prime.ru), an economic news agency
- Social Navigator (sn.ria.ru), a website about social issues
- TOK (tok.media), a film studio, includes the KOT animal welfare project
- Arctic.ru, a news website about the Arctic

== Controversy ==
=== Allegations of homophobia ===
The organisation is headed by Dmitry Kiselyov, a pro-Putin news presenter on the domestic Russia-1 television channel, who has gained significant controversy in the Western media with his remarks claiming foreign conspiracies against Russia and verbally abusing homosexuals.

Kiselyov, who has been described as the "spearhead" of such anti-LGBTQ propaganda on the network, has made various provocative comments regarding the Russian LGBTQ community. He has stated that a homosexual person's organs are unworthy of being transplanted to a heterosexual, and that gay men should be prohibited from donating blood or sperm. The Russian LGBTQ community has also been referred to by Kiselyov as an "aggressive minority" opposed to "parents fighting to give their children a healthy upbringing", stating falsified statistics that "40% of children brought up by homosexuals have venereal diseases".

== Allegations of censorship ==
On 1 December 2014, Ukrainian journalist Oleksandr Chalenko accused Rossiya Segodnya of censorship after an interview with the former Defense Minister of the self-proclaimed Donetsk People's Republic, Igor Strelkov. The Strelkov's press service and the agency's editorial staff reduced it, removing the confirmation of Igor Strelkov's own title of Colonel of the FSB and the negative assessment of the assault by Donetsk airport units.

== Awards ==
On 17 May 2017 MIA Rossiya Segodnya design center was awarded The Communicator Awards: gold - in the category "Marketing and Promotion" and two silver.

== Sanctions ==
March 2022 saw the UK government imposing sanctions on Rossiya Segodnya for broadcasting Russian propaganda.

February 2023 saw Canada also sanctioning Rossiya Segodnya for being involved in Russian propaganda and spreading misinformation relating to the Russian invasion of Ukraine, with other sanctions being put in place by the EU.

== See also ==
- Media of Russia
- RT India
