= List of minor planets: 669001–670000 =

The following is a partial list of minor planets, running from minor-planet number 669001 through 670000, inclusive. The primary data for this and other partial lists is based on JPL's "Small-Body Orbital Elements" and data available from the Minor Planet Center. Critical list information is also provided by the MPC, unless otherwise specified from Lowell Observatory. A detailed description of the table's columns and additional sources are given on the main page including a complete list of every page in this series, and a statistical break-up on the dynamical classification of minor planets.

Also see the summary list of all named bodies in numerical and alphabetical order, and the corresponding naming citations for the number range of this particular list. New namings may only be added to this list after official publication, as the preannouncement of names is condemned by the Working Group for Small Bodies Nomenclature of the International Astronomical Union.

Near-Earth obj.	MBA (inner)	MBA (outer)	Centaur
Mars-crosser	MBA (middle)	Jupiter trojan	Trans-Neptunian obj.
Unclassified

== 669001–669100 ==
Designation			Discovery			Properties		Ref
Permanent	Provisional	Named after	Date	Site	Discoverer(s)	Category	Diam.	Ref
669001	2012 QN_{56}	—	August 26, 2012	Kitt Peak	Spacewatch	·	1.5 km	MPC · JPL
669002	2012 QX_{58}	—	September 25, 2017	Haleakala	Pan-STARRS 1	·	1.9 km	MPC · JPL
669003	2012 QS_{59}	—	August 24, 2012	Kitt Peak	Spacewatch	·	3.2 km	MPC · JPL
669004	2012 QG_{60}	—	August 19, 2012	Siding Spring	SSS	H	390 m	MPC · JPL
669005	2012 QO_{60}	—	November 28, 2013	Mount Lemmon	Mount Lemmon Survey	·	1.6 km	MPC · JPL
669006	2012 QX_{63}	—	January 24, 2020	Haleakala	Pan-STARRS 2	JUN	790 m	MPC · JPL
669007	2012 QN_{64}	—	August 25, 2012	Haleakala	Pan-STARRS 1	·	570 m	MPC · JPL
669008	2012 QU_{64}	—	August 24, 2012	Kitt Peak	Spacewatch	AEO	860 m	MPC · JPL
669009	2012 QB_{65}	—	August 26, 2012	Catalina	CSS	·	1.4 km	MPC · JPL
669010	2012 QR_{67}	—	August 26, 2012	Haleakala	Pan-STARRS 1	·	1.6 km	MPC · JPL
669011	2012 QS_{70}	—	August 26, 2012	Haleakala	Pan-STARRS 1	·	1.3 km	MPC · JPL
669012	2012 QC_{71}	—	August 26, 2012	Haleakala	Pan-STARRS 1	KOR	980 m	MPC · JPL
669013	2012 RX_{4}	—	August 26, 2012	Haleakala	Pan-STARRS 1	·	620 m	MPC · JPL
669014	2012 RB_{8}	—	August 12, 2012	Siding Spring	SSS	·	1.9 km	MPC · JPL
669015	2012 RB_{15}	—	August 25, 2012	Haleakala	Pan-STARRS 1	·	2.3 km	MPC · JPL
669016	2012 RB_{16}	—	September 15, 2012	La Sagra	OAM	·	2.4 km	MPC · JPL
669017	2012 RR_{19}	—	March 12, 2007	Kitt Peak	Spacewatch	·	1.7 km	MPC · JPL
669018	2012 RC_{24}	—	September 14, 2012	Kitt Peak	Spacewatch	(5)	950 m	MPC · JPL
669019	2012 RG_{24}	—	September 15, 2012	ESA OGS	ESA OGS	·	1.4 km	MPC · JPL
669020	2012 RM_{25}	—	September 15, 2012	Catalina	CSS	V	550 m	MPC · JPL
669021	2012 RW_{27}	—	October 26, 2009	Kitt Peak	Spacewatch	(2076)	800 m	MPC · JPL
669022	2012 RT_{29}	—	January 28, 2007	Mount Lemmon	Mount Lemmon Survey	·	1.3 km	MPC · JPL
669023	2012 RH_{32}	—	August 25, 2012	Haleakala	Pan-STARRS 1	·	1.5 km	MPC · JPL
669024	2012 RW_{33}	—	August 31, 2005	Kitt Peak	Spacewatch	BAP	620 m	MPC · JPL
669025	2012 RK_{35}	—	September 15, 2012	Kitt Peak	Spacewatch	GEF	930 m	MPC · JPL
669026	2012 RA_{36}	—	September 15, 2012	Kitt Peak	Spacewatch	·	1.8 km	MPC · JPL
669027	2012 RL_{36}	—	January 23, 2006	Mount Lemmon	Mount Lemmon Survey	·	1.2 km	MPC · JPL
669028	2012 RY_{36}	—	September 11, 2012	Siding Spring	SSS	·	2.3 km	MPC · JPL
669029	2012 RT_{38}	—	August 24, 2003	Cerro Tololo	Deep Ecliptic Survey	·	1.7 km	MPC · JPL
669030	2012 RX_{40}	—	September 15, 2012	Catalina	CSS	·	1.8 km	MPC · JPL
669031	2012 RD_{41}	—	August 28, 2006	Siding Spring	SSS	·	3.8 km	MPC · JPL
669032	2012 RY_{43}	—	September 14, 2012	Catalina	CSS	H	420 m	MPC · JPL
669033	2012 RN_{45}	—	September 6, 2012	Mount Lemmon	Mount Lemmon Survey	·	2.1 km	MPC · JPL
669034	2012 RA_{46}	—	September 15, 2012	Mount Lemmon	Mount Lemmon Survey	·	1.2 km	MPC · JPL
669035	2012 RY_{46}	—	September 30, 2003	Kitt Peak	Spacewatch	·	1.4 km	MPC · JPL
669036	2012 RD_{47}	—	September 23, 2008	Mount Lemmon	Mount Lemmon Survey	JUN	800 m	MPC · JPL
669037	2012 RO_{47}	—	August 13, 2012	Bergisch Gladbach	W. Bickel	·	600 m	MPC · JPL
669038	2012 RF_{48}	—	September 14, 2012	ASC-Kislovodsk	Nevski, V., A. Novichonok	·	2.0 km	MPC · JPL
669039	2012 RZ_{49}	—	September 15, 2012	Catalina	CSS	·	670 m	MPC · JPL
669040	2012 SL_{7}	—	September 17, 2012	Kitt Peak	Spacewatch	ADE	1.9 km	MPC · JPL
669041	2012 SO_{10}	—	February 24, 2006	Palomar	NEAT	H	510 m	MPC · JPL
669042	2012 SR_{10}	—	September 16, 2012	Kitt Peak	Spacewatch	·	630 m	MPC · JPL
669043	2012 SU_{10}	—	October 12, 2007	Mount Lemmon	Mount Lemmon Survey	·	2.5 km	MPC · JPL
669044	2012 SJ_{12}	—	September 17, 2012	Kitt Peak	Spacewatch	·	1.7 km	MPC · JPL
669045	2012 SS_{13}	—	October 1, 1995	Kitt Peak	Spacewatch	·	510 m	MPC · JPL
669046	2012 SP_{14}	—	September 17, 2012	Kitt Peak	Spacewatch	·	670 m	MPC · JPL
669047	2012 SX_{15}	—	September 17, 2012	Kitt Peak	Spacewatch	·	1.3 km	MPC · JPL
669048	2012 SC_{16}	—	April 8, 2011	Kitt Peak	Spacewatch	ADE	1.7 km	MPC · JPL
669049	2012 SU_{16}	—	November 2, 2007	Mount Lemmon	Mount Lemmon Survey	·	1.3 km	MPC · JPL
669050	2012 SS_{18}	—	September 17, 2012	Kitt Peak	Spacewatch	GAL	1.2 km	MPC · JPL
669051	2012 SD_{22}	—	September 19, 2012	Catalina	CSS	APO · PHA	340 m	MPC · JPL
669052	2012 SG_{22}	—	September 21, 2012	Kitt Peak	Spacewatch	·	1.6 km	MPC · JPL
669053	2012 SQ_{22}	—	September 16, 2012	Catalina	CSS	·	670 m	MPC · JPL
669054	2012 SL_{25}	—	September 13, 2004	Kitt Peak	Spacewatch	H	360 m	MPC · JPL
669055	2012 SV_{25}	—	September 17, 2012	Mount Lemmon	Mount Lemmon Survey	·	640 m	MPC · JPL
669056	2012 SH_{35}	—	August 26, 2012	Haleakala	Pan-STARRS 1	(13314)	1.6 km	MPC · JPL
669057	2012 SQ_{35}	—	September 18, 2012	Mount Lemmon	Mount Lemmon Survey	·	530 m	MPC · JPL
669058	2012 SZ_{35}	—	May 5, 2011	Mount Lemmon	Mount Lemmon Survey	MRX	770 m	MPC · JPL
669059	2012 SU_{36}	—	March 20, 2001	Junk Bond	D. Healy	·	1.8 km	MPC · JPL
669060	2012 SG_{39}	—	August 26, 2012	Haleakala	Pan-STARRS 1	·	610 m	MPC · JPL
669061	2012 SN_{39}	—	August 23, 2003	Palomar	NEAT	·	1.6 km	MPC · JPL
669062	2012 SN_{40}	—	September 18, 2012	Mount Lemmon	Mount Lemmon Survey	·	500 m	MPC · JPL
669063	2012 SC_{42}	—	September 18, 2012	Mount Lemmon	Mount Lemmon Survey	·	540 m	MPC · JPL
669064	2012 SG_{52}	—	August 25, 2012	Kitt Peak	Spacewatch	·	540 m	MPC · JPL
669065	2012 SF_{56}	—	September 16, 2012	Catalina	CSS	·	1.8 km	MPC · JPL
669066	2012 SF_{57}	—	March 30, 2011	Haleakala	Pan-STARRS 1	H	360 m	MPC · JPL
669067	2012 SP_{57}	—	September 30, 2003	Kitt Peak	Spacewatch	·	1.3 km	MPC · JPL
669068	2012 SS_{57}	—	October 6, 1991	Palomar	Lowe, A.	(5)	1.4 km	MPC · JPL
669069	2012 SO_{58}	—	October 10, 2008	Mount Lemmon	Mount Lemmon Survey	·	1.7 km	MPC · JPL
669070	2012 SN_{59}	—	August 18, 2003	Haleakala	NEAT	·	1.9 km	MPC · JPL
669071	2012 SJ_{60}	—	September 17, 2012	Kitt Peak	Spacewatch	·	480 m	MPC · JPL
669072	2012 SG_{63}	—	October 22, 2003	Kitt Peak	Spacewatch	DOR	1.9 km	MPC · JPL
669073	2012 SN_{64}	—	September 16, 2012	Catalina	CSS	·	1.7 km	MPC · JPL
669074	2012 SD_{65}	—	December 21, 2008	Catalina	CSS	·	1.4 km	MPC · JPL
669075	2012 SD_{66}	—	September 22, 2008	Mount Lemmon	Mount Lemmon Survey	ADE	1.8 km	MPC · JPL
669076	2012 SO_{67}	—	September 17, 2012	Mount Lemmon	Mount Lemmon Survey	·	1.6 km	MPC · JPL
669077	2012 SP_{67}	—	September 17, 2012	Mount Lemmon	Mount Lemmon Survey	·	1.4 km	MPC · JPL
669078	2012 SY_{68}	—	September 19, 2012	Mount Lemmon	Mount Lemmon Survey	·	1.6 km	MPC · JPL
669079	2012 SX_{69}	—	September 18, 2003	Haleakala	NEAT	EUN	1.5 km	MPC · JPL
669080	2012 SP_{70}	—	September 21, 2012	Kitt Peak	Spacewatch	AGN	1.0 km	MPC · JPL
669081	2012 SL_{72}	—	September 25, 2012	Mount Lemmon	Mount Lemmon Survey	·	3.5 km	MPC · JPL
669082	2012 ST_{72}	—	December 28, 2013	Kitt Peak	Spacewatch	AGN	970 m	MPC · JPL
669083	2012 SZ_{72}	—	October 25, 2003	Kitt Peak	Spacewatch	·	1.5 km	MPC · JPL
669084	2012 SM_{74}	—	September 21, 2012	Mount Lemmon	Mount Lemmon Survey	·	1.1 km	MPC · JPL
669085	2012 SB_{76}	—	September 16, 2012	Kitt Peak	Spacewatch	·	500 m	MPC · JPL
669086	2012 SS_{77}	—	September 23, 2012	Mount Lemmon	Mount Lemmon Survey	·	530 m	MPC · JPL
669087	2012 SW_{77}	—	September 25, 2012	Mount Lemmon	Mount Lemmon Survey	·	560 m	MPC · JPL
669088	2012 SH_{80}	—	February 9, 2010	WISE	WISE	·	1.9 km	MPC · JPL
669089	2012 SL_{80}	—	September 17, 2012	Kitt Peak	Spacewatch	·	540 m	MPC · JPL
669090	2012 SY_{81}	—	August 31, 2017	Haleakala	Pan-STARRS 1	·	1.7 km	MPC · JPL
669091	2012 SO_{83}	—	July 30, 2017	Haleakala	Pan-STARRS 1	(16286)	1.5 km	MPC · JPL
669092	2012 SB_{85}	—	July 29, 2017	Haleakala	Pan-STARRS 1	·	1.4 km	MPC · JPL
669093	2012 SY_{86}	—	September 21, 2012	Charleston	R. Holmes	·	1.5 km	MPC · JPL
669094	2012 SE_{87}	—	September 21, 2012	Mount Lemmon	Mount Lemmon Survey	·	1.1 km	MPC · JPL
669095	2012 SV_{87}	—	August 26, 2012	Haleakala	Pan-STARRS 1	·	1.7 km	MPC · JPL
669096	2012 SF_{88}	—	September 26, 2012	Mount Lemmon	Mount Lemmon Survey	(13314)	1.7 km	MPC · JPL
669097	2012 SZ_{88}	—	September 25, 2012	Mount Lemmon	Mount Lemmon Survey	·	1.3 km	MPC · JPL
669098	2012 SM_{97}	—	September 21, 2012	Mount Lemmon	Mount Lemmon Survey	·	1.2 km	MPC · JPL
669099	2012 TJ_{2}	—	August 26, 2012	Haleakala	Pan-STARRS 1	·	450 m	MPC · JPL
669100	2012 TD_{7}	—	August 26, 2012	Haleakala	Pan-STARRS 1	·	1.8 km	MPC · JPL

== 669101–669200 ==
back to top

Designation			Discovery			Properties		Ref
Permanent	Provisional	Named after	Date	Site	Discoverer(s)	Category	Diam.	Ref
669101	2012 TZ_{7}	—	October 6, 2012	Haleakala	Pan-STARRS 1	·	1.1 km	MPC · JPL
669102	2012 TP_{8}	—	September 14, 2012	Catalina	CSS	·	2.0 km	MPC · JPL
669103	2012 TL_{9}	—	September 15, 2012	Mount Lemmon	Mount Lemmon Survey	·	1.5 km	MPC · JPL
669104	2012 TS_{13}	—	September 16, 2012	Kitt Peak	Spacewatch	·	2.0 km	MPC · JPL
669105	2012 TB_{27}	—	March 21, 2001	Kitt Peak	Spacewatch	·	2.3 km	MPC · JPL
669106	2012 TA_{28}	—	September 22, 2012	Kitt Peak	Spacewatch	·	1.5 km	MPC · JPL
669107	2012 TQ_{29}	—	July 31, 2005	Siding Spring	SSS	·	590 m	MPC · JPL
669108	2012 TQ_{32}	—	September 15, 2012	Kitt Peak	Spacewatch	MAS	490 m	MPC · JPL
669109	2012 TT_{32}	—	October 6, 2012	Mount Lemmon	Mount Lemmon Survey	·	1.1 km	MPC · JPL
669110	2012 TS_{34}	—	March 13, 2011	Mount Lemmon	Mount Lemmon Survey	H	390 m	MPC · JPL
669111	2012 TQ_{37}	—	October 6, 2012	Haleakala	Pan-STARRS 1	·	1.7 km	MPC · JPL
669112	2012 TT_{37}	—	October 6, 2012	Haleakala	Pan-STARRS 1	·	1.8 km	MPC · JPL
669113	2012 TP_{39}	—	August 10, 2007	Kitt Peak	Spacewatch	·	2.3 km	MPC · JPL
669114	2012 TY_{47}	—	September 17, 2012	Mount Lemmon	Mount Lemmon Survey	·	490 m	MPC · JPL
669115	2012 TT_{49}	—	May 1, 2006	Mauna Kea	P. A. Wiegert	AGN	950 m	MPC · JPL
669116	2012 TJ_{50}	—	October 6, 1999	Kitt Peak	Spacewatch	·	480 m	MPC · JPL
669117	2012 TS_{51}	—	April 5, 2011	Catalina	CSS	H	420 m	MPC · JPL
669118	2012 TL_{53}	—	September 27, 2003	Kitt Peak	Spacewatch	·	1.5 km	MPC · JPL
669119	2012 TP_{53}	—	April 3, 2011	Haleakala	Pan-STARRS 1	·	1.5 km	MPC · JPL
669120	2012 TR_{54}	—	March 17, 2005	Mount Lemmon	Mount Lemmon Survey	·	2.0 km	MPC · JPL
669121	2012 TD_{55}	—	October 6, 2012	Kitt Peak	Spacewatch	EOS	1.5 km	MPC · JPL
669122	2012 TT_{56}	—	October 6, 2012	Kitt Peak	Spacewatch	·	640 m	MPC · JPL
669123	2012 TX_{56}	—	October 29, 2005	Mount Lemmon	Mount Lemmon Survey	·	540 m	MPC · JPL
669124	2012 TV_{57}	—	September 16, 2012	Mount Lemmon	Mount Lemmon Survey	(5)	1.2 km	MPC · JPL
669125	2012 TK_{60}	—	October 25, 2008	Kitt Peak	Spacewatch	·	1.4 km	MPC · JPL
669126	2012 TC_{61}	—	September 16, 2012	Nogales	M. Schwartz, P. R. Holvorcem	·	2.0 km	MPC · JPL
669127	2012 TK_{63}	—	October 8, 2012	Haleakala	Pan-STARRS 1	·	1.8 km	MPC · JPL
669128	2012 TC_{64}	—	October 8, 2012	Haleakala	Pan-STARRS 1	·	1.8 km	MPC · JPL
669129	2012 TZ_{74}	—	September 22, 2012	Kitt Peak	Spacewatch	·	1.4 km	MPC · JPL
669130	2012 TH_{77}	—	October 9, 2012	Mount Lemmon	Mount Lemmon Survey	·	1.6 km	MPC · JPL
669131	2012 TJ_{77}	—	October 9, 2012	Mount Lemmon	Mount Lemmon Survey	·	1.3 km	MPC · JPL
669132	2012 TN_{77}	—	October 6, 2012	Haleakala	Pan-STARRS 1	H	460 m	MPC · JPL
669133	2012 TB_{81}	—	September 17, 2012	Mount Lemmon	Mount Lemmon Survey	·	1.5 km	MPC · JPL
669134	2012 TD_{83}	—	October 6, 2012	Mount Lemmon	Mount Lemmon Survey	·	1.4 km	MPC · JPL
669135	2012 TD_{99}	—	October 8, 2012	Kitt Peak	Spacewatch	HOF	2.0 km	MPC · JPL
669136	2012 TO_{99}	—	October 8, 2012	Haleakala	Pan-STARRS 1	·	2.0 km	MPC · JPL
669137	2012 TW_{99}	—	September 16, 2012	Kitt Peak	Spacewatch	DOR	2.1 km	MPC · JPL
669138	2012 TA_{100}	—	September 21, 2012	Mount Lemmon	Mount Lemmon Survey	·	1.7 km	MPC · JPL
669139	2012 TP_{100}	—	September 21, 2012	Kitt Peak	Spacewatch	·	540 m	MPC · JPL
669140	2012 TD_{102}	—	September 12, 2007	Mount Lemmon	Mount Lemmon Survey	KOR	1.1 km	MPC · JPL
669141	2012 TK_{104}	—	December 18, 2009	Kitt Peak	Spacewatch	·	480 m	MPC · JPL
669142	2012 TQ_{105}	—	September 16, 2012	Charleston	R. Holmes	·	2.6 km	MPC · JPL
669143	2012 TZ_{106}	—	October 9, 2012	Haleakala	Pan-STARRS 1	EOS	1.5 km	MPC · JPL
669144	2012 TX_{108}	—	January 28, 2007	Mount Lemmon	Mount Lemmon Survey	·	570 m	MPC · JPL
669145	2012 TF_{112}	—	October 10, 2012	Mount Lemmon	Mount Lemmon Survey	·	1.2 km	MPC · JPL
669146	2012 TL_{116}	—	October 10, 2012	Mount Lemmon	Mount Lemmon Survey	·	1.5 km	MPC · JPL
669147	2012 TX_{118}	—	September 9, 2007	Pla D'Arguines	R. Ferrando, Ferrando, M.	·	1.6 km	MPC · JPL
669148	2012 TR_{119}	—	September 25, 2012	Kitt Peak	Spacewatch	·	1.4 km	MPC · JPL
669149	2012 TL_{122}	—	November 16, 2003	Kitt Peak	Spacewatch	·	2.2 km	MPC · JPL
669150	2012 TN_{125}	—	October 20, 2003	Kitt Peak	Spacewatch	·	1.5 km	MPC · JPL
669151	2012 TK_{126}	—	September 17, 2003	Kitt Peak	Spacewatch	·	1.7 km	MPC · JPL
669152	2012 TS_{127}	—	October 6, 2012	Haleakala	Pan-STARRS 1	·	2.2 km	MPC · JPL
669153	2012 TZ_{129}	—	September 24, 2012	Kitt Peak	Spacewatch	DOR	1.7 km	MPC · JPL
669154	2012 TB_{130}	—	October 9, 2012	Haleakala	Pan-STARRS 1	H	450 m	MPC · JPL
669155	2012 TT_{131}	—	October 23, 2003	Kitt Peak	Spacewatch	·	2.9 km	MPC · JPL
669156	2012 TN_{144}	—	November 11, 2009	Kitt Peak	Spacewatch	·	600 m	MPC · JPL
669157	2012 TE_{153}	—	October 8, 2012	Haleakala	Pan-STARRS 1	·	1.4 km	MPC · JPL
669158	2012 TW_{159}	—	September 21, 2012	Mount Lemmon SkyCe	T. Vorobjov, Kostin, A.	·	1.2 km	MPC · JPL
669159	2012 TP_{160}	—	February 28, 2006	Mount Lemmon	Mount Lemmon Survey	·	1.4 km	MPC · JPL
669160	2012 TR_{160}	—	February 11, 2004	Palomar	NEAT	·	760 m	MPC · JPL
669161	2012 TL_{164}	—	September 22, 2012	Kitt Peak	Spacewatch	·	1.6 km	MPC · JPL
669162	2012 TV_{164}	—	October 8, 2012	Haleakala	Pan-STARRS 1	·	1.2 km	MPC · JPL
669163	2012 TV_{166}	—	October 8, 2012	Haleakala	Pan-STARRS 1	·	650 m	MPC · JPL
669164	2012 TC_{167}	—	October 8, 2012	Haleakala	Pan-STARRS 1	·	1.3 km	MPC · JPL
669165	2012 TK_{167}	—	October 8, 2012	Haleakala	Pan-STARRS 1	·	1.7 km	MPC · JPL
669166	2012 TS_{167}	—	October 8, 2012	Haleakala	Pan-STARRS 1	·	1.7 km	MPC · JPL
669167	2012 TS_{170}	—	October 9, 2012	Kitt Peak	Spacewatch	·	1.4 km	MPC · JPL
669168	2012 TA_{171}	—	September 25, 2012	Mount Lemmon	Mount Lemmon Survey	·	1.2 km	MPC · JPL
669169	2012 TV_{172}	—	September 15, 2012	Kitt Peak	Spacewatch	·	700 m	MPC · JPL
669170	2012 TW_{175}	—	September 17, 2012	Mount Lemmon	Mount Lemmon Survey	DOR	1.8 km	MPC · JPL
669171	2012 TJ_{176}	—	March 26, 2007	Kitt Peak	Spacewatch	L5	7.1 km	MPC · JPL
669172	2012 TP_{176}	—	October 9, 2012	Haleakala	Pan-STARRS 1	·	510 m	MPC · JPL
669173	2012 TN_{177}	—	October 9, 2012	Haleakala	Pan-STARRS 1	·	560 m	MPC · JPL
669174	2012 TP_{181}	—	September 18, 2012	Kitt Peak	Spacewatch	H	350 m	MPC · JPL
669175	2012 TC_{185}	—	October 9, 2012	Haleakala	Pan-STARRS 1	·	530 m	MPC · JPL
669176	2012 TL_{186}	—	October 9, 2012	Mount Lemmon	Mount Lemmon Survey	·	1.3 km	MPC · JPL
669177	2012 TJ_{191}	—	December 29, 2005	Mount Lemmon	Mount Lemmon Survey	3:2	5.6 km	MPC · JPL
669178	2012 TA_{193}	—	September 21, 2012	Kitt Peak	Spacewatch	(1547)	1.0 km	MPC · JPL
669179	2012 TG_{193}	—	October 29, 2008	Kitt Peak	Spacewatch	·	1.2 km	MPC · JPL
669180	2012 TF_{197}	—	September 23, 2012	Mount Lemmon	Mount Lemmon Survey	·	1.6 km	MPC · JPL
669181	2012 TG_{198}	—	October 11, 2012	Kitt Peak	Spacewatch	·	500 m	MPC · JPL
669182	2012 TF_{203}	—	June 16, 2004	Kitt Peak	Spacewatch	·	1.2 km	MPC · JPL
669183	2012 TD_{205}	—	September 21, 2012	Mount Lemmon	Mount Lemmon Survey	EUN	1.1 km	MPC · JPL
669184	2012 TA_{207}	—	September 18, 2012	Kitt Peak	Spacewatch	·	510 m	MPC · JPL
669185	2012 TD_{207}	—	November 3, 2004	Kitt Peak	Spacewatch	·	1.3 km	MPC · JPL
669186	2012 TZ_{226}	—	October 7, 2012	Haleakala	Pan-STARRS 1	·	1.4 km	MPC · JPL
669187	2012 TK_{227}	—	October 7, 2012	Haleakala	Pan-STARRS 1	·	560 m	MPC · JPL
669188	2012 TO_{228}	—	September 19, 2003	Kitt Peak	Spacewatch	·	1.5 km	MPC · JPL
669189	2012 TE_{232}	—	September 11, 2012	Siding Spring	SSS	H	420 m	MPC · JPL
669190	2012 TD_{233}	—	September 29, 2003	Kitt Peak	Spacewatch	·	1.2 km	MPC · JPL
669191	2012 TE_{233}	—	September 13, 2007	Kitt Peak	Spacewatch	·	1.5 km	MPC · JPL
669192	2012 TU_{234}	—	September 23, 2008	Mount Lemmon	Mount Lemmon Survey	(5)	890 m	MPC · JPL
669193	2012 TA_{237}	—	October 23, 2003	Kitt Peak	Spacewatch	·	1.9 km	MPC · JPL
669194	2012 TZ_{238}	—	September 15, 2012	Catalina	CSS	MRX	900 m	MPC · JPL
669195	2012 TC_{240}	—	October 16, 2003	Kitt Peak	Spacewatch	·	1.4 km	MPC · JPL
669196	2012 TW_{240}	—	October 8, 2012	Haleakala	Pan-STARRS 1	·	2.1 km	MPC · JPL
669197	2012 TW_{243}	—	October 8, 2012	Mount Lemmon	Mount Lemmon Survey	·	1.5 km	MPC · JPL
669198	2012 TE_{247}	—	October 11, 2012	Kitt Peak	Spacewatch	·	1.4 km	MPC · JPL
669199	2012 TF_{247}	—	September 19, 2003	Kitt Peak	Spacewatch	·	1.8 km	MPC · JPL
669200	2012 TZ_{248}	—	October 11, 2012	Haleakala	Pan-STARRS 1	·	1.7 km	MPC · JPL

== 669201–669300 ==
back to top

Designation			Discovery			Properties		Ref
Permanent	Provisional	Named after	Date	Site	Discoverer(s)	Category	Diam.	Ref
669201	2012 TT_{250}	—	October 11, 2012	Haleakala	Pan-STARRS 1	·	560 m	MPC · JPL
669202	2012 TR_{251}	—	October 11, 2012	Haleakala	Pan-STARRS 1	·	590 m	MPC · JPL
669203	2012 TY_{251}	—	October 11, 2012	Haleakala	Pan-STARRS 1	·	1.4 km	MPC · JPL
669204	2012 TU_{252}	—	September 14, 2007	Mount Lemmon	Mount Lemmon Survey	·	2.6 km	MPC · JPL
669205	2012 TQ_{253}	—	October 11, 2012	Haleakala	Pan-STARRS 1	·	630 m	MPC · JPL
669206	2012 TS_{258}	—	April 14, 2010	Mount Lemmon	Mount Lemmon Survey	·	1.6 km	MPC · JPL
669207	2012 TR_{259}	—	October 5, 2012	Haleakala	Pan-STARRS 1	·	550 m	MPC · JPL
669208	2012 TP_{260}	—	June 9, 2011	Mount Lemmon	Mount Lemmon Survey	L5	6.7 km	MPC · JPL
669209	2012 TX_{261}	—	November 14, 2007	Kitt Peak	Spacewatch	THM	2.0 km	MPC · JPL
669210	2012 TB_{262}	—	September 13, 2007	Mount Lemmon	Mount Lemmon Survey	KOR	970 m	MPC · JPL
669211	2012 TC_{264}	—	April 7, 2010	Kitt Peak	Spacewatch	·	1.6 km	MPC · JPL
669212	2012 TS_{264}	—	October 8, 2012	Haleakala	Pan-STARRS 1	·	2.1 km	MPC · JPL
669213	2012 TQ_{266}	—	August 11, 2007	Siding Spring	SSS	GEF	1.4 km	MPC · JPL
669214	2012 TU_{270}	—	November 18, 2007	Mount Lemmon	Mount Lemmon Survey	·	1.6 km	MPC · JPL
669215	2012 TR_{279}	—	July 30, 2008	Kitt Peak	Spacewatch	·	1.0 km	MPC · JPL
669216	2012 TZ_{279}	—	October 11, 2012	Haleakala	Pan-STARRS 1	·	1.6 km	MPC · JPL
669217	2012 TD_{280}	—	October 15, 2003	Palomar	NEAT	EUN	1.5 km	MPC · JPL
669218	2012 TE_{284}	—	October 6, 2012	Mount Lemmon	Mount Lemmon Survey	·	620 m	MPC · JPL
669219	2012 TT_{286}	—	October 26, 2008	Bisei	BATTeRS	·	1.3 km	MPC · JPL
669220	2012 TV_{286}	—	September 7, 2008	Mount Lemmon	Mount Lemmon Survey	·	1.2 km	MPC · JPL
669221	2012 TZ_{286}	—	February 14, 2005	Kitt Peak	Spacewatch	·	1.6 km	MPC · JPL
669222	2012 TC_{288}	—	October 10, 2012	Mount Lemmon	Mount Lemmon Survey	EOS	1.4 km	MPC · JPL
669223	2012 TM_{289}	—	October 10, 2012	Haleakala	Pan-STARRS 1	·	1.4 km	MPC · JPL
669224	2012 TM_{291}	—	October 5, 2012	Kitt Peak	Spacewatch	·	740 m	MPC · JPL
669225	2012 TX_{291}	—	October 14, 2012	Kitt Peak	Spacewatch	·	1.5 km	MPC · JPL
669226	2012 TU_{295}	—	September 19, 2007	Kitt Peak	Spacewatch	MRX	910 m	MPC · JPL
669227	2012 TE_{304}	—	October 8, 2012	Haleakala	Pan-STARRS 1	·	1.7 km	MPC · JPL
669228	2012 TT_{304}	—	September 20, 2003	Kitt Peak	Spacewatch	·	1.6 km	MPC · JPL
669229	2012 TK_{305}	—	October 8, 2012	Haleakala	Pan-STARRS 1	·	1.3 km	MPC · JPL
669230	2012 TM_{309}	—	September 14, 2012	Catalina	CSS	·	650 m	MPC · JPL
669231	2012 TJ_{312}	—	October 14, 2012	Catalina	CSS	·	1.9 km	MPC · JPL
669232	2012 TW_{315}	—	October 7, 2012	Oukaïmeden	C. Rinner	·	1.7 km	MPC · JPL
669233	2012 TG_{316}	—	August 22, 2003	Haleakala	NEAT	·	2.2 km	MPC · JPL
669234	2012 TD_{320}	—	April 24, 2007	Mount Lemmon	Mount Lemmon Survey	·	1.5 km	MPC · JPL
669235	2012 TC_{324}	—	October 30, 2008	Apache Point	SDSS	res · 3:5	176 km	MPC · JPL
669236	2012 TQ_{324}	—	November 22, 2005	Kitt Peak	Spacewatch	3:2	6.0 km	MPC · JPL
669237	2012 TS_{329}	—	October 11, 2012	Nogales	M. Schwartz, P. R. Holvorcem	·	1.4 km	MPC · JPL
669238	2012 TW_{329}	—	October 11, 2012	Haleakala	Pan-STARRS 1	·	1.4 km	MPC · JPL
669239	2012 TB_{331}	—	January 17, 2007	Kitt Peak	Spacewatch	·	670 m	MPC · JPL
669240	2012 TH_{331}	—	October 6, 2012	Haleakala	Pan-STARRS 1	·	1.8 km	MPC · JPL
669241	2012 TG_{332}	—	October 8, 2012	Haleakala	Pan-STARRS 1	·	2.1 km	MPC · JPL
669242	2012 TQ_{332}	—	October 11, 2012	Haleakala	Pan-STARRS 1	·	1.4 km	MPC · JPL
669243	2012 TH_{333}	—	December 10, 2013	Haleakala	Pan-STARRS 1	·	1.6 km	MPC · JPL
669244	2012 TR_{333}	—	October 8, 2012	Mount Lemmon	Mount Lemmon Survey	·	1.5 km	MPC · JPL
669245	2012 TX_{333}	—	October 6, 2012	Haleakala	Pan-STARRS 1	·	1.6 km	MPC · JPL
669246	2012 TP_{334}	—	October 6, 2012	Kitt Peak	Spacewatch	·	550 m	MPC · JPL
669247	2012 TH_{338}	—	October 18, 2003	Anderson Mesa	LONEOS	·	1.6 km	MPC · JPL
669248	2012 TZ_{338}	—	October 10, 2012	Mount Lemmon	Mount Lemmon Survey	·	1.4 km	MPC · JPL
669249	2012 TJ_{340}	—	October 7, 2012	Haleakala	Pan-STARRS 1	·	690 m	MPC · JPL
669250	2012 TN_{343}	—	October 15, 2012	Kitt Peak	Spacewatch	·	670 m	MPC · JPL
669251	2012 TR_{343}	—	May 19, 2018	Haleakala	Pan-STARRS 1	·	540 m	MPC · JPL
669252	2012 TS_{343}	—	October 11, 2012	Haleakala	Pan-STARRS 1	·	630 m	MPC · JPL
669253	2012 TY_{343}	—	October 15, 2012	Kitt Peak	Spacewatch	·	540 m	MPC · JPL
669254	2012 TB_{344}	—	October 9, 2012	Mount Lemmon	Mount Lemmon Survey	·	650 m	MPC · JPL
669255	2012 TJ_{344}	—	January 28, 2014	Catalina	CSS	·	1.8 km	MPC · JPL
669256	2012 TG_{353}	—	October 8, 2012	Haleakala	Pan-STARRS 1	·	690 m	MPC · JPL
669257	2012 TE_{355}	—	October 6, 2012	Haleakala	Pan-STARRS 1	·	1.4 km	MPC · JPL
669258	2012 TH_{355}	—	October 8, 2012	Mount Lemmon	Mount Lemmon Survey	·	1.4 km	MPC · JPL
669259	2012 TJ_{358}	—	October 7, 2012	Haleakala	Pan-STARRS 1	·	1.6 km	MPC · JPL
669260	2012 TR_{360}	—	October 8, 2012	Mount Lemmon	Mount Lemmon Survey	·	1.5 km	MPC · JPL
669261	2012 TF_{364}	—	October 11, 2012	Haleakala	Pan-STARRS 1	·	1.4 km	MPC · JPL
669262	2012 TW_{364}	—	October 9, 2012	Mount Lemmon	Mount Lemmon Survey	·	510 m	MPC · JPL
669263	2012 TU_{365}	—	October 9, 2012	Mount Lemmon	Mount Lemmon Survey	·	1.4 km	MPC · JPL
669264	2012 TO_{369}	—	October 10, 2012	Mount Lemmon	Mount Lemmon Survey	·	1.7 km	MPC · JPL
669265	2012 TW_{369}	—	October 11, 2012	Haleakala	Pan-STARRS 1	L5	5.8 km	MPC · JPL
669266	2012 TL_{378}	—	October 11, 2012	Haleakala	Pan-STARRS 1	·	1.4 km	MPC · JPL
669267	2012 TH_{379}	—	October 6, 2012	Haleakala	Pan-STARRS 1	·	1.6 km	MPC · JPL
669268	2012 TZ_{391}	—	October 8, 2012	Haleakala	Pan-STARRS 1	·	590 m	MPC · JPL
669269	2012 UM	—	October 8, 2012	Kitt Peak	Spacewatch	·	1.9 km	MPC · JPL
669270	2012 UA_{6}	—	October 8, 2012	Mount Lemmon	Mount Lemmon Survey	·	520 m	MPC · JPL
669271	2012 UA_{13}	—	October 16, 2012	Mount Lemmon	Mount Lemmon Survey	·	1.6 km	MPC · JPL
669272	2012 UJ_{16}	—	October 16, 2012	Mount Lemmon	Mount Lemmon Survey	·	1.2 km	MPC · JPL
669273	2012 UK_{20}	—	October 8, 2012	Mount Lemmon	Mount Lemmon Survey	·	630 m	MPC · JPL
669274	2012 UL_{21}	—	December 29, 2008	Kitt Peak	Spacewatch	KOR	950 m	MPC · JPL
669275	2012 UB_{24}	—	October 17, 2012	Mount Lemmon	Mount Lemmon Survey	·	1.8 km	MPC · JPL
669276	2012 UA_{25}	—	October 17, 2012	Mount Lemmon	Mount Lemmon Survey	·	1.7 km	MPC · JPL
669277	2012 UJ_{25}	—	September 10, 2005	Anderson Mesa	LONEOS	·	620 m	MPC · JPL
669278	2012 UY_{25}	—	January 16, 2005	Mauna Kea	Veillet, C.	·	1.9 km	MPC · JPL
669279	2012 UV_{26}	—	October 17, 2012	Mount Lemmon	Mount Lemmon Survey	EOS	1.5 km	MPC · JPL
669280	2012 UM_{27}	—	September 16, 2012	Kitt Peak	Spacewatch	·	1.6 km	MPC · JPL
669281	2012 UJ_{30}	—	April 13, 2004	Mount Graham	Ryan, W., Jamieson, Q.	·	510 m	MPC · JPL
669282	2012 UB_{32}	—	October 7, 2004	Socorro	LINEAR	H	340 m	MPC · JPL
669283	2012 UN_{35}	—	October 8, 2012	Kitt Peak	Spacewatch	·	570 m	MPC · JPL
669284	2012 UT_{41}	—	September 16, 2012	Kitt Peak	Spacewatch	·	1.5 km	MPC · JPL
669285	2012 UD_{44}	—	October 18, 2012	Mount Lemmon	Mount Lemmon Survey	JUN	1.2 km	MPC · JPL
669286	2012 UQ_{47}	—	October 5, 2012	Kitt Peak	Spacewatch	·	770 m	MPC · JPL
669287	2012 US_{47}	—	October 18, 2012	Haleakala	Pan-STARRS 1	·	1.6 km	MPC · JPL
669288	2012 UD_{48}	—	September 23, 2008	Mount Lemmon	Mount Lemmon Survey	·	1.2 km	MPC · JPL
669289	2012 UV_{55}	—	August 31, 2005	Kitt Peak	Spacewatch	·	550 m	MPC · JPL
669290	2012 UG_{59}	—	October 19, 2012	Haleakala	Pan-STARRS 1	·	620 m	MPC · JPL
669291	2012 UX_{59}	—	October 19, 2012	Haleakala	Pan-STARRS 1	·	580 m	MPC · JPL
669292	2012 UJ_{62}	—	April 9, 2002	Palomar	NEAT	EUN	1.3 km	MPC · JPL
669293	2012 UB_{63}	—	October 17, 2012	Mount Lemmon	Mount Lemmon Survey	·	620 m	MPC · JPL
669294	2012 UX_{65}	—	October 4, 2005	Mount Lemmon	Mount Lemmon Survey	·	490 m	MPC · JPL
669295	2012 UK_{67}	—	October 20, 2012	Haleakala	Pan-STARRS 1	·	2.8 km	MPC · JPL
669296	2012 UT_{67}	—	October 19, 2012	Haleakala	Pan-STARRS 1	H	480 m	MPC · JPL
669297	2012 UR_{69}	—	November 30, 2003	Kitt Peak	Spacewatch	NEM	2.2 km	MPC · JPL
669298	2012 UJ_{70}	—	September 16, 2012	Mount Lemmon	Mount Lemmon Survey	·	1.8 km	MPC · JPL
669299	2012 UO_{78}	—	July 30, 2005	Palomar	NEAT	·	570 m	MPC · JPL
669300	2012 UG_{79}	—	December 1, 2003	Kitt Peak	Spacewatch	·	1.3 km	MPC · JPL

== 669301–669400 ==
back to top

Designation			Discovery			Properties		Ref
Permanent	Provisional	Named after	Date	Site	Discoverer(s)	Category	Diam.	Ref
669301	2012 UR_{80}	—	August 27, 2003	Palomar	NEAT	·	1.9 km	MPC · JPL
669302	2012 UR_{81}	—	December 21, 2008	Mount Lemmon	Mount Lemmon Survey	·	1.1 km	MPC · JPL
669303	2012 US_{81}	—	November 30, 2005	Kitt Peak	Spacewatch	·	850 m	MPC · JPL
669304	2012 UG_{85}	—	October 10, 2012	Kitt Peak	Spacewatch	·	1.3 km	MPC · JPL
669305	2012 UK_{89}	—	October 21, 2012	Haleakala	Pan-STARRS 1	H	450 m	MPC · JPL
669306	2012 UW_{97}	—	October 23, 2003	Kitt Peak	Spacewatch	·	1.8 km	MPC · JPL
669307	2012 UE_{103}	—	October 18, 2012	Haleakala	Pan-STARRS 1	·	580 m	MPC · JPL
669308	2012 UM_{107}	—	September 26, 2012	Mount Lemmon	Mount Lemmon Survey	·	590 m	MPC · JPL
669309	2012 UT_{107}	—	September 9, 2007	Anderson Mesa	LONEOS	·	1.8 km	MPC · JPL
669310	2012 UT_{111}	—	October 21, 2012	Haleakala	Pan-STARRS 1	H	370 m	MPC · JPL
669311	2012 UD_{119}	—	October 9, 2012	Mount Lemmon	Mount Lemmon Survey	·	540 m	MPC · JPL
669312	2012 UY_{123}	—	October 15, 2012	Kitt Peak	Spacewatch	·	1.6 km	MPC · JPL
669313	2012 UL_{127}	—	October 22, 2012	Haleakala	Pan-STARRS 1	·	580 m	MPC · JPL
669314	2012 UN_{131}	—	September 21, 2012	Catalina	CSS	PHO	700 m	MPC · JPL
669315	2012 UG_{132}	—	October 8, 2012	Catalina	CSS	·	1.8 km	MPC · JPL
669316	2012 UO_{132}	—	November 24, 2003	Anderson Mesa	LONEOS	MRX	910 m	MPC · JPL
669317	2012 UM_{133}	—	November 6, 2008	Mount Lemmon	Mount Lemmon Survey	·	1.9 km	MPC · JPL
669318	2012 UD_{136}	—	October 21, 2012	Catalina	CSS	·	1.7 km	MPC · JPL
669319	2012 UL_{136}	—	October 17, 2012	Catalina	CSS	·	1.4 km	MPC · JPL
669320	2012 UO_{136}	—	September 16, 2012	ESA OGS	ESA OGS	·	1.2 km	MPC · JPL
669321	2012 UC_{140}	—	October 10, 2012	Mount Lemmon	Mount Lemmon Survey	·	1.2 km	MPC · JPL
669322	2012 US_{140}	—	October 10, 2012	Mount Lemmon	Mount Lemmon Survey	·	580 m	MPC · JPL
669323	2012 UX_{141}	—	August 23, 2003	Palomar	NEAT	·	1.5 km	MPC · JPL
669324	2012 UC_{150}	—	August 29, 2005	Kitt Peak	Spacewatch	·	600 m	MPC · JPL
669325	2012 UR_{152}	—	October 7, 2012	Kitt Peak	Spacewatch	EOS	1.6 km	MPC · JPL
669326	2012 UJ_{157}	—	October 23, 2012	Haleakala	Pan-STARRS 1	NAE	1.7 km	MPC · JPL
669327	2012 UG_{158}	—	October 24, 2012	Haleakala	Pan-STARRS 1	H	450 m	MPC · JPL
669328	2012 UV_{162}	—	October 14, 2012	Kitt Peak	Spacewatch	·	1.8 km	MPC · JPL
669329	2012 UZ_{162}	—	October 22, 2012	Mount Lemmon	Mount Lemmon Survey	T_{j} (2.98)	2.6 km	MPC · JPL
669330	2012 UK_{163}	—	December 19, 2004	Mount Lemmon	Mount Lemmon Survey	(5)	1.4 km	MPC · JPL
669331	2012 UN_{164}	—	October 23, 2012	Haleakala	Pan-STARRS 1	·	1.8 km	MPC · JPL
669332	2012 UX_{169}	—	October 23, 2012	Mount Lemmon	Mount Lemmon Survey	·	2.0 km	MPC · JPL
669333	2012 UZ_{169}	—	October 7, 2012	Haleakala	Pan-STARRS 1	TIN	1.1 km	MPC · JPL
669334	2012 UX_{173}	—	November 4, 2007	Mount Lemmon	Mount Lemmon Survey	·	2.2 km	MPC · JPL
669335	2012 UK_{174}	—	October 27, 2012	Haleakala	Pan-STARRS 1	H	380 m	MPC · JPL
669336	2012 UD_{176}	—	October 23, 2012	Kitt Peak	Spacewatch	·	630 m	MPC · JPL
669337	2012 UE_{182}	—	October 19, 2012	Haleakala	Pan-STARRS 1	·	570 m	MPC · JPL
669338	2012 UA_{184}	—	October 18, 2012	Haleakala	Pan-STARRS 1	·	610 m	MPC · JPL
669339	2012 UX_{184}	—	October 19, 2012	Mount Lemmon	Mount Lemmon Survey	·	2.0 km	MPC · JPL
669340	2012 UH_{185}	—	October 26, 2012	Haleakala	Pan-STARRS 1	·	1.9 km	MPC · JPL
669341	2012 US_{185}	—	October 21, 2012	Mount Lemmon	Mount Lemmon Survey	·	1.5 km	MPC · JPL
669342	2012 UV_{185}	—	April 24, 2015	Haleakala	Pan-STARRS 1	·	2.0 km	MPC · JPL
669343	2012 UQ_{187}	—	October 18, 2012	Haleakala	Pan-STARRS 1	EOS	1.0 km	MPC · JPL
669344	2012 UY_{188}	—	October 22, 2012	Haleakala	Pan-STARRS 1	·	1.7 km	MPC · JPL
669345	2012 UT_{189}	—	October 26, 2012	Mount Lemmon	Mount Lemmon Survey	·	1.9 km	MPC · JPL
669346	2012 UE_{190}	—	March 17, 2015	Haleakala	Pan-STARRS 1	TIR	2.5 km	MPC · JPL
669347	2012 UL_{190}	—	November 16, 2015	Haleakala	Pan-STARRS 1	H	500 m	MPC · JPL
669348	2012 UA_{191}	—	October 19, 2012	Mount Lemmon	Mount Lemmon Survey	·	550 m	MPC · JPL
669349	2012 UP_{191}	—	October 23, 2012	Kitt Peak	Spacewatch	·	1.3 km	MPC · JPL
669350	2012 UX_{199}	—	October 27, 2012	Mount Lemmon	Mount Lemmon Survey	GAL	1.3 km	MPC · JPL
669351	2012 UY_{199}	—	October 17, 2012	Haleakala	Pan-STARRS 1	H	380 m	MPC · JPL
669352	2012 UH_{200}	—	October 17, 2012	Mount Lemmon	Mount Lemmon Survey	·	700 m	MPC · JPL
669353	2012 UK_{200}	—	October 21, 2017	Mount Lemmon	Mount Lemmon Survey	·	1.4 km	MPC · JPL
669354	2012 UV_{202}	—	October 10, 2012	Mount Lemmon	Mount Lemmon Survey	·	1.6 km	MPC · JPL
669355	2012 UJ_{206}	—	October 29, 2017	Haleakala	Pan-STARRS 1	·	1.6 km	MPC · JPL
669356	2012 UG_{209}	—	October 22, 2012	Haleakala	Pan-STARRS 1	·	2.0 km	MPC · JPL
669357	2012 UW_{209}	—	January 26, 2014	Nogales	M. Schwartz, P. R. Holvorcem	·	1.4 km	MPC · JPL
669358	2012 UY_{210}	—	October 30, 2007	Mount Lemmon	Mount Lemmon Survey	KOR	990 m	MPC · JPL
669359	2012 UB_{211}	—	October 20, 2012	Mount Lemmon	Mount Lemmon Survey	·	1.1 km	MPC · JPL
669360	2012 UT_{214}	—	October 18, 2012	Haleakala	Pan-STARRS 1	LIX	3.0 km	MPC · JPL
669361	2012 UC_{215}	—	October 18, 2012	Haleakala	Pan-STARRS 1	KOR	940 m	MPC · JPL
669362	2012 UX_{216}	—	September 12, 2007	Mount Bigelow	CSS	DOR	2.0 km	MPC · JPL
669363	2012 UZ_{217}	—	October 16, 2012	Mount Lemmon	Mount Lemmon Survey	·	1.3 km	MPC · JPL
669364	2012 UZ_{221}	—	October 17, 2012	Haleakala	Pan-STARRS 1	HOF	2.0 km	MPC · JPL
669365	2012 UA_{223}	—	October 18, 2012	Haleakala	Pan-STARRS 1	·	1.9 km	MPC · JPL
669366	2012 UF_{226}	—	October 17, 2012	Mount Lemmon	Mount Lemmon Survey	·	1.2 km	MPC · JPL
669367	2012 UG_{227}	—	October 22, 2012	Haleakala	Pan-STARRS 1	·	630 m	MPC · JPL
669368	2012 UL_{234}	—	October 17, 2012	Mount Lemmon	Mount Lemmon Survey	·	1.6 km	MPC · JPL
669369	2012 UU_{235}	—	October 18, 2012	Haleakala	Pan-STARRS 1	KOR	990 m	MPC · JPL
669370	2012 UJ_{243}	—	October 22, 2012	Haleakala	Pan-STARRS 1	·	1.1 km	MPC · JPL
669371	2012 VM	—	October 20, 2012	Haleakala	Pan-STARRS 1	·	1.5 km	MPC · JPL
669372	2012 VW_{3}	—	November 3, 2012	Haleakala	Pan-STARRS 1	NAE	1.8 km	MPC · JPL
669373	2012 VB_{8}	—	October 15, 2012	Kitt Peak	Spacewatch	H	390 m	MPC · JPL
669374	2012 VQ_{9}	—	October 22, 2012	Mount Lemmon	Mount Lemmon Survey	·	550 m	MPC · JPL
669375	2012 VN_{13}	—	October 18, 2012	Haleakala	Pan-STARRS 1	·	1.3 km	MPC · JPL
669376	2012 VP_{16}	—	November 1, 2005	Kitt Peak	Spacewatch	·	680 m	MPC · JPL
669377	2012 VQ_{16}	—	November 6, 2012	Kitt Peak	Spacewatch	H	390 m	MPC · JPL
669378	2012 VO_{20}	—	October 14, 1998	Kitt Peak	Spacewatch	·	1.4 km	MPC · JPL
669379	2012 VB_{32}	—	October 18, 2012	Haleakala	Pan-STARRS 1	KOR	1.0 km	MPC · JPL
669380	2012 VM_{40}	—	September 26, 2012	Mount Lemmon SkyCe	T. Vorobjov, Kostin, A.	·	2.1 km	MPC · JPL
669381	2012 VQ_{42}	—	November 6, 2012	Mount Lemmon	Mount Lemmon Survey	·	2.0 km	MPC · JPL
669382	2012 VN_{46}	—	October 8, 2012	Haleakala	Pan-STARRS 1	EUN	1.2 km	MPC · JPL
669383	2012 VH_{56}	—	November 7, 2007	Kitt Peak	Spacewatch	·	1.2 km	MPC · JPL
669384	2012 VZ_{58}	—	November 7, 2012	Haleakala	Pan-STARRS 1	·	1.4 km	MPC · JPL
669385	2012 VJ_{60}	—	May 21, 2006	Mount Lemmon	Mount Lemmon Survey	·	1.4 km	MPC · JPL
669386	2012 VX_{67}	—	September 18, 2012	Mount Lemmon	Mount Lemmon Survey	·	990 m	MPC · JPL
669387	2012 VN_{69}	—	January 2, 2009	Mount Lemmon	Mount Lemmon Survey	MRX	890 m	MPC · JPL
669388	2012 VT_{70}	—	November 7, 2012	Haleakala	Pan-STARRS 1	·	1.5 km	MPC · JPL
669389	2012 VV_{72}	—	November 6, 2005	Kitt Peak	Spacewatch	NYS	630 m	MPC · JPL
669390	2012 VE_{84}	—	November 14, 2012	Kitt Peak	Spacewatch	·	1.5 km	MPC · JPL
669391	2012 VZ_{84}	—	July 28, 2011	Haleakala	Pan-STARRS 1	·	1.7 km	MPC · JPL
669392	2012 VX_{86}	—	February 4, 2005	Palomar	NEAT	·	2.1 km	MPC · JPL
669393	2012 VD_{87}	—	October 9, 2012	Mount Lemmon	Mount Lemmon Survey	·	2.5 km	MPC · JPL
669394	2012 VM_{98}	—	October 23, 2012	Nogales	M. Schwartz, P. R. Holvorcem	·	1.6 km	MPC · JPL
669395	2012 VA_{99}	—	October 14, 2012	Kitt Peak	Spacewatch	·	1.6 km	MPC · JPL
669396	2012 VN_{101}	—	October 1, 2005	Kitt Peak	Spacewatch	·	600 m	MPC · JPL
669397	2012 VD_{105}	—	May 1, 2003	Kitt Peak	Spacewatch	H	470 m	MPC · JPL
669398	2012 VS_{105}	—	September 20, 2003	Kitt Peak	Spacewatch	T_{j} (2.98) · 3:2	4.9 km	MPC · JPL
669399	2012 VO_{107}	—	November 12, 2012	Mount Lemmon	Mount Lemmon Survey	EOS	1.4 km	MPC · JPL
669400	2012 VJ_{109}	—	October 21, 2012	Kitt Peak	Spacewatch	·	1.7 km	MPC · JPL

== 669401–669500 ==
back to top

Designation			Discovery			Properties		Ref
Permanent	Provisional	Named after	Date	Site	Discoverer(s)	Category	Diam.	Ref
669401	2012 VV_{109}	—	October 8, 2012	Kitt Peak	Spacewatch	·	650 m	MPC · JPL
669402	2012 VU_{115}	—	September 22, 1995	Kitt Peak	Spacewatch	·	1.0 km	MPC · JPL
669403	2012 VJ_{116}	—	March 22, 2014	Mount Lemmon	Mount Lemmon Survey	·	2.6 km	MPC · JPL
669404	2012 VN_{116}	—	November 15, 2012	Mount Lemmon	Mount Lemmon Survey	·	2.3 km	MPC · JPL
669405	2012 VE_{117}	—	November 7, 2012	Mount Lemmon	Mount Lemmon Survey	EOS	1.4 km	MPC · JPL
669406	2012 VH_{117}	—	November 12, 2012	Mount Lemmon	Mount Lemmon Survey	·	1.2 km	MPC · JPL
669407	2012 VJ_{117}	—	November 7, 2012	Mount Lemmon	Mount Lemmon Survey	·	1.6 km	MPC · JPL
669408	2012 VQ_{117}	—	November 13, 2012	Mount Lemmon	Mount Lemmon Survey	·	2.0 km	MPC · JPL
669409	2012 VX_{117}	—	October 1, 2017	Haleakala	Pan-STARRS 1	·	1.4 km	MPC · JPL
669410	2012 VL_{118}	—	November 7, 2012	Mount Lemmon	Mount Lemmon Survey	·	1.4 km	MPC · JPL
669411	2012 VR_{119}	—	August 17, 2001	Palomar	NEAT	·	870 m	MPC · JPL
669412	2012 VS_{120}	—	November 12, 2012	Mount Lemmon	Mount Lemmon Survey	·	490 m	MPC · JPL
669413	2012 VK_{122}	—	October 15, 2017	Mount Lemmon	Mount Lemmon Survey	·	1.7 km	MPC · JPL
669414	2012 VB_{126}	—	April 29, 2014	Haleakala	Pan-STARRS 1	·	660 m	MPC · JPL
669415	2012 VT_{128}	—	November 7, 2012	Kitt Peak	Spacewatch	·	1.2 km	MPC · JPL
669416	2012 VM_{129}	—	November 12, 2012	Haleakala	Pan-STARRS 1	·	1.2 km	MPC · JPL
669417	2012 VN_{133}	—	November 3, 2012	Mount Lemmon	Mount Lemmon Survey	·	510 m	MPC · JPL
669418	2012 VL_{134}	—	November 12, 2012	Mount Lemmon	Mount Lemmon Survey	·	550 m	MPC · JPL
669419	2012 VK_{135}	—	November 7, 2012	Mount Lemmon	Mount Lemmon Survey	·	1.7 km	MPC · JPL
669420	2012 VP_{140}	—	November 14, 2012	Kitt Peak	Spacewatch	KOR	1.1 km	MPC · JPL
669421	2012 VU_{140}	—	November 4, 2005	Kitt Peak	Spacewatch	·	540 m	MPC · JPL
669422	2012 WN	—	October 26, 2012	Haleakala	Pan-STARRS 1	·	1.7 km	MPC · JPL
669423	2012 WX	—	October 14, 2012	Kitt Peak	Spacewatch	MRX	820 m	MPC · JPL
669424	2012 WD_{1}	—	November 18, 2012	Charleston	R. Holmes	·	1.2 km	MPC · JPL
669425	2012 WY_{6}	—	October 20, 1998	Kitt Peak	Spacewatch	·	1.1 km	MPC · JPL
669426	2012 WL_{9}	—	November 4, 2012	Kitt Peak	Spacewatch	·	1.9 km	MPC · JPL
669427	2012 WL_{10}	—	October 22, 2012	Haleakala	Pan-STARRS 1	KOR	1.0 km	MPC · JPL
669428	2012 WZ_{13}	—	October 9, 2012	Mount Lemmon	Mount Lemmon Survey	·	1.9 km	MPC · JPL
669429	2012 WR_{14}	—	November 19, 2012	Kitt Peak	Spacewatch	EOS	1.5 km	MPC · JPL
669430	2012 WL_{15}	—	September 21, 2003	Kitt Peak	Spacewatch	·	2.0 km	MPC · JPL
669431	2012 WT_{17}	—	October 22, 2012	Haleakala	Pan-STARRS 1	EOS	1.3 km	MPC · JPL
669432	2012 WO_{19}	—	December 22, 2008	Kitt Peak	Spacewatch	·	1.7 km	MPC · JPL
669433	2012 WS_{24}	—	June 17, 2005	Mount Lemmon	Mount Lemmon Survey	·	2.3 km	MPC · JPL
669434	2012 WF_{26}	—	October 27, 2012	Mount Lemmon	Mount Lemmon Survey	·	580 m	MPC · JPL
669435	2012 WF_{32}	—	September 24, 2012	Catalina	CSS	·	2.2 km	MPC · JPL
669436	2012 WU_{32}	—	November 26, 2012	Mount Lemmon	Mount Lemmon Survey	·	1.4 km	MPC · JPL
669437	2012 WH_{33}	—	September 26, 2005	Palomar	NEAT	·	520 m	MPC · JPL
669438	2012 WV_{33}	—	November 26, 2012	Mount Lemmon	Mount Lemmon Survey	EOS	1.5 km	MPC · JPL
669439	2012 WD_{34}	—	November 26, 2012	Mount Lemmon	Mount Lemmon Survey	·	2.1 km	MPC · JPL
669440	2012 WN_{35}	—	November 26, 2012	Mount Lemmon	Mount Lemmon Survey	H	490 m	MPC · JPL
669441	2012 WG_{36}	—	November 26, 2012	Mount Lemmon	Mount Lemmon Survey	H	490 m	MPC · JPL
669442	2012 WH_{36}	—	November 20, 2012	Mount Lemmon	Mount Lemmon Survey	H	380 m	MPC · JPL
669443	2012 WO_{37}	—	March 25, 2015	Haleakala	Pan-STARRS 1	·	1.7 km	MPC · JPL
669444	2012 WP_{37}	—	November 24, 2012	Kitt Peak	Spacewatch	·	1.6 km	MPC · JPL
669445	2012 WE_{39}	—	November 20, 2012	Catalina	CSS	·	750 m	MPC · JPL
669446	2012 WL_{39}	—	July 9, 2016	Haleakala	Pan-STARRS 1	EOS	1.5 km	MPC · JPL
669447	2012 WY_{40}	—	November 20, 2012	Mount Lemmon	Mount Lemmon Survey	·	520 m	MPC · JPL
669448 Pavelgabor	2012 WR_{41}	Pavelgabor	November 25, 2012	Mount Graham	K. Černis, R. P. Boyle	EOS	1.6 km	MPC · JPL
669449	2012 WC_{44}	—	November 25, 2012	Kitt Peak	Spacewatch	·	1.4 km	MPC · JPL
669450	2012 WY_{45}	—	November 26, 2012	Mount Lemmon	Mount Lemmon Survey	·	2.4 km	MPC · JPL
669451	2012 XU_{3}	—	March 13, 2005	Kitt Peak	Spacewatch	AGN	1.3 km	MPC · JPL
669452	2012 XC_{7}	—	October 22, 2012	Haleakala	Pan-STARRS 1	·	580 m	MPC · JPL
669453	2012 XK_{7}	—	October 21, 2012	Kitt Peak	Spacewatch	·	950 m	MPC · JPL
669454	2012 XA_{8}	—	December 2, 2012	Mount Lemmon	Mount Lemmon Survey	·	1.2 km	MPC · JPL
669455	2012 XG_{8}	—	May 8, 2006	Mount Lemmon	Mount Lemmon Survey	·	1.6 km	MPC · JPL
669456	2012 XM_{9}	—	October 20, 2012	Kitt Peak	Spacewatch	WIT	1.1 km	MPC · JPL
669457	2012 XG_{15}	—	November 22, 2012	Kitt Peak	Spacewatch	·	1.7 km	MPC · JPL
669458	2012 XF_{20}	—	November 10, 2005	Mount Lemmon	Mount Lemmon Survey	·	440 m	MPC · JPL
669459	2012 XG_{22}	—	September 20, 2003	Palomar	NEAT	·	1.8 km	MPC · JPL
669460	2012 XL_{24}	—	September 23, 2005	Kitt Peak	Spacewatch	·	600 m	MPC · JPL
669461	2012 XP_{25}	—	October 22, 2012	Haleakala	Pan-STARRS 1	·	720 m	MPC · JPL
669462	2012 XM_{29}	—	November 7, 2012	Mount Lemmon	Mount Lemmon Survey	·	1.9 km	MPC · JPL
669463	2012 XP_{35}	—	December 31, 2008	Kitt Peak	Spacewatch	·	1.8 km	MPC · JPL
669464	2012 XK_{36}	—	November 12, 2012	Mount Lemmon	Mount Lemmon Survey	MRX	840 m	MPC · JPL
669465	2012 XR_{37}	—	January 16, 2005	Mauna Kea	Veillet, C.	·	1.2 km	MPC · JPL
669466	2012 XJ_{39}	—	February 17, 2004	Kitt Peak	Spacewatch	KOR	1.3 km	MPC · JPL
669467	2012 XD_{47}	—	November 7, 2012	Mount Lemmon	Mount Lemmon Survey	·	1.4 km	MPC · JPL
669468	2012 XX_{47}	—	September 9, 2008	Kitt Peak	Spacewatch	·	880 m	MPC · JPL
669469	2012 XQ_{48}	—	December 5, 2012	Mount Lemmon	Mount Lemmon Survey	·	1.2 km	MPC · JPL
669470	2012 XD_{52}	—	December 15, 2007	Kitt Peak	Spacewatch	·	1.3 km	MPC · JPL
669471	2012 XL_{54}	—	July 15, 2007	Bergisch Gladbach	W. Bickel	·	1.4 km	MPC · JPL
669472	2012 XJ_{58}	—	May 30, 2008	Mount Lemmon	Mount Lemmon Survey	·	650 m	MPC · JPL
669473	2012 XF_{59}	—	November 1, 2008	Mount Lemmon	Mount Lemmon Survey	·	860 m	MPC · JPL
669474	2012 XK_{59}	—	December 4, 2012	Mount Lemmon	Mount Lemmon Survey	·	940 m	MPC · JPL
669475	2012 XE_{61}	—	November 12, 2012	Mount Lemmon	Mount Lemmon Survey	·	1.7 km	MPC · JPL
669476	2012 XE_{62}	—	July 28, 2003	Palomar	NEAT	·	1.4 km	MPC · JPL
669477	2012 XH_{64}	—	December 4, 2012	Mount Lemmon	Mount Lemmon Survey	·	1.7 km	MPC · JPL
669478	2012 XV_{65}	—	June 28, 2011	Mount Lemmon	Mount Lemmon Survey	·	1.9 km	MPC · JPL
669479	2012 XL_{66}	—	September 12, 2001	Kitt Peak	Deep Ecliptic Survey	·	1.4 km	MPC · JPL
669480	2012 XS_{69}	—	December 5, 2012	Mount Lemmon	Mount Lemmon Survey	·	1.4 km	MPC · JPL
669481	2012 XO_{70}	—	March 18, 2001	Kitt Peak	Spacewatch	·	2.4 km	MPC · JPL
669482	2012 XJ_{71}	—	November 7, 2012	Mount Lemmon	Mount Lemmon Survey	·	1.3 km	MPC · JPL
669483	2012 XQ_{71}	—	November 7, 2012	Mount Lemmon	Mount Lemmon Survey	AGN	1.1 km	MPC · JPL
669484	2012 XX_{72}	—	December 6, 2012	Mount Lemmon	Mount Lemmon Survey	·	1.3 km	MPC · JPL
669485	2012 XL_{76}	—	October 21, 2007	Mount Lemmon	Mount Lemmon Survey	·	2.2 km	MPC · JPL
669486	2012 XA_{77}	—	October 7, 2007	Mount Lemmon	Mount Lemmon Survey	KOR	1.0 km	MPC · JPL
669487	2012 XF_{79}	—	October 1, 2008	Kitt Peak	Spacewatch	·	940 m	MPC · JPL
669488	2012 XU_{80}	—	July 27, 2011	Haleakala	Pan-STARRS 1	·	1.5 km	MPC · JPL
669489	2012 XF_{82}	—	November 4, 2012	Kitt Peak	Spacewatch	·	1.2 km	MPC · JPL
669490	2012 XH_{84}	—	December 7, 2012	Nogales	M. Schwartz, P. R. Holvorcem	·	1.8 km	MPC · JPL
669491	2012 XC_{85}	—	July 28, 2011	Haleakala	Pan-STARRS 1	EOS	1.7 km	MPC · JPL
669492	2012 XA_{86}	—	December 7, 2012	Kitt Peak	Spacewatch	·	1.8 km	MPC · JPL
669493	2012 XB_{93}	—	August 23, 2003	Palomar	NEAT	(5)	1.4 km	MPC · JPL
669494	2012 XC_{93}	—	September 18, 2011	Haleakala	Pan-STARRS 1	·	3.3 km	MPC · JPL
669495	2012 XV_{100}	—	December 5, 2012	Mount Lemmon	Mount Lemmon Survey	·	1.6 km	MPC · JPL
669496	2012 XS_{103}	—	November 7, 2012	Mount Lemmon	Mount Lemmon Survey	·	2.6 km	MPC · JPL
669497	2012 XW_{103}	—	December 6, 2012	Mount Lemmon	Mount Lemmon Survey	·	1.4 km	MPC · JPL
669498	2012 XO_{104}	—	December 6, 2012	Mount Lemmon	Mount Lemmon Survey	H	540 m	MPC · JPL
669499	2012 XD_{105}	—	November 22, 2012	Kitt Peak	Spacewatch	·	1.5 km	MPC · JPL
669500	2012 XO_{107}	—	November 15, 1995	Kitt Peak	Spacewatch	·	1.5 km	MPC · JPL

== 669501–669600 ==
back to top

Designation			Discovery			Properties		Ref
Permanent	Provisional	Named after	Date	Site	Discoverer(s)	Category	Diam.	Ref
669501	2012 XK_{111}	—	January 2, 2009	Catalina	CSS	·	2.2 km	MPC · JPL
669502	2012 XT_{113}	—	December 6, 2012	Catalina	CSS	H	500 m	MPC · JPL
669503	2012 XP_{114}	—	September 27, 2003	Apache Point	SDSS	HNS	1.4 km	MPC · JPL
669504	2012 XV_{114}	—	December 6, 2012	Nogales	M. Schwartz, P. R. Holvorcem	·	1.8 km	MPC · JPL
669505	2012 XP_{115}	—	October 7, 2012	Kitt Peak	Spacewatch	·	1.8 km	MPC · JPL
669506	2012 XU_{115}	—	January 16, 2009	Kitt Peak	Spacewatch	·	1.3 km	MPC · JPL
669507	2012 XP_{117}	—	November 26, 2012	Mount Lemmon	Mount Lemmon Survey	H	510 m	MPC · JPL
669508	2012 XW_{118}	—	November 19, 2007	Kitt Peak	Spacewatch	KOR	1.2 km	MPC · JPL
669509	2012 XB_{119}	—	December 8, 2012	Mount Lemmon	Mount Lemmon Survey	KOR	1.2 km	MPC · JPL
669510	2012 XC_{119}	—	December 8, 2012	Mount Lemmon	Mount Lemmon Survey	·	660 m	MPC · JPL
669511	2012 XP_{119}	—	December 8, 2012	Nogales	M. Schwartz, P. R. Holvorcem	·	2.6 km	MPC · JPL
669512	2012 XN_{121}	—	January 21, 2001	Kitt Peak	Spacewatch	·	1.4 km	MPC · JPL
669513	2012 XS_{122}	—	July 28, 2011	Haleakala	Pan-STARRS 1	·	1.8 km	MPC · JPL
669514	2012 XL_{125}	—	December 9, 2012	Haleakala	Pan-STARRS 1	EOS	1.8 km	MPC · JPL
669515	2012 XG_{127}	—	December 10, 2012	Haleakala	Pan-STARRS 1	EOS	1.3 km	MPC · JPL
669516	2012 XM_{130}	—	December 3, 2012	Mount Lemmon	Mount Lemmon Survey	·	1.7 km	MPC · JPL
669517	2012 XV_{130}	—	November 14, 2012	Kitt Peak	Spacewatch	·	670 m	MPC · JPL
669518	2012 XM_{137}	—	November 5, 2012	Kitt Peak	Spacewatch	·	770 m	MPC · JPL
669519	2012 XK_{139}	—	October 17, 2012	Mount Lemmon	Mount Lemmon Survey	·	2.0 km	MPC · JPL
669520	2012 XY_{139}	—	November 6, 2012	Kitt Peak	Spacewatch	·	1.5 km	MPC · JPL
669521	2012 XM_{142}	—	December 7, 2012	Haleakala	Pan-STARRS 1	615	1.1 km	MPC · JPL
669522	2012 XA_{143}	—	December 7, 2012	Haleakala	Pan-STARRS 1	MAR	1.2 km	MPC · JPL
669523	2012 XU_{143}	—	December 2, 2012	Mount Lemmon	Mount Lemmon Survey	·	2.1 km	MPC · JPL
669524	2012 XV_{143}	—	September 12, 2002	Palomar	NEAT	·	2.3 km	MPC · JPL
669525	2012 XO_{144}	—	September 27, 2011	Mount Lemmon	Mount Lemmon Survey	T_{j} (2.66) · unusual	3.4 km	MPC · JPL
669526	2012 XV_{149}	—	November 19, 2007	Kitt Peak	Spacewatch	·	2.4 km	MPC · JPL
669527	2012 XB_{151}	—	October 20, 2012	Haleakala	Pan-STARRS 1	·	1.8 km	MPC · JPL
669528	2012 XT_{151}	—	September 18, 2003	Palomar	NEAT	·	1.4 km	MPC · JPL
669529	2012 XA_{153}	—	November 26, 2012	Mount Lemmon	Mount Lemmon Survey	·	1.8 km	MPC · JPL
669530	2012 XH_{154}	—	October 17, 2012	Mount Lemmon	Mount Lemmon Survey	·	1.4 km	MPC · JPL
669531	2012 XW_{155}	—	January 17, 2004	Palomar	NEAT	EUN	1.4 km	MPC · JPL
669532	2012 XA_{156}	—	November 7, 2012	Kitt Peak	Spacewatch	(5)	1.1 km	MPC · JPL
669533	2012 XB_{156}	—	December 3, 2012	Catalina	CSS	·	2.0 km	MPC · JPL
669534	2012 XC_{156}	—	May 31, 2003	Cerro Tololo	Deep Ecliptic Survey	·	950 m	MPC · JPL
669535	2012 XR_{157}	—	December 11, 2012	Cerro Tololo	C. A. Trujillo, S. S. Sheppard	twotino	209 km	MPC · JPL
669536	2012 XC_{158}	—	December 8, 2012	Mount Lemmon	Mount Lemmon Survey	·	1.5 km	MPC · JPL
669537	2012 XJ_{158}	—	December 8, 2012	Kitt Peak	Spacewatch	H	370 m	MPC · JPL
669538	2012 XJ_{159}	—	December 3, 2012	Mount Lemmon	Mount Lemmon Survey	·	610 m	MPC · JPL
669539	2012 XU_{159}	—	December 12, 2012	Mount Lemmon	Mount Lemmon Survey	·	1.3 km	MPC · JPL
669540	2012 XU_{160}	—	December 8, 2012	Kitt Peak	Spacewatch	·	2.4 km	MPC · JPL
669541	2012 XC_{161}	—	December 9, 2012	Haleakala	Pan-STARRS 1	·	1.7 km	MPC · JPL
669542	2012 XG_{161}	—	December 12, 2012	Mount Lemmon	Mount Lemmon Survey	·	2.0 km	MPC · JPL
669543	2012 XL_{161}	—	December 13, 2012	Mount Lemmon	Mount Lemmon Survey	·	2.6 km	MPC · JPL
669544	2012 XZ_{162}	—	December 6, 2012	Mount Lemmon	Mount Lemmon Survey	·	840 m	MPC · JPL
669545	2012 XM_{165}	—	December 3, 2012	Mount Lemmon	Mount Lemmon Survey	NYS	650 m	MPC · JPL
669546	2012 XF_{166}	—	December 13, 2012	Mount Lemmon	Mount Lemmon Survey	·	2.4 km	MPC · JPL
669547	2012 XT_{167}	—	July 28, 2015	Haleakala	Pan-STARRS 1	·	580 m	MPC · JPL
669548	2012 XL_{168}	—	December 11, 2012	Nogales	M. Schwartz, P. R. Holvorcem	PHO	950 m	MPC · JPL
669549	2012 XL_{170}	—	December 11, 2012	Mount Lemmon	Mount Lemmon Survey	·	1.4 km	MPC · JPL
669550	2012 XO_{172}	—	December 10, 2012	Haleakala	Pan-STARRS 1	·	2.8 km	MPC · JPL
669551	2012 XC_{175}	—	July 27, 2011	Haleakala	Pan-STARRS 1	AGN	1.1 km	MPC · JPL
669552	2012 XP_{175}	—	December 12, 2012	Mount Lemmon	Mount Lemmon Survey	·	1.9 km	MPC · JPL
669553	2012 XJ_{177}	—	December 7, 2012	Haleakala	Pan-STARRS 1	·	2.0 km	MPC · JPL
669554	2012 YD_{1}	—	December 18, 2012	Oukaïmeden	M. Ory	·	2.0 km	MPC · JPL
669555	2012 YQ_{1}	—	December 19, 2012	Elena Remote	Oreshko, A., T. V. Krjačko	APO · PHA	210 m	MPC · JPL
669556	2012 YW_{2}	—	November 12, 2012	Mount Lemmon	Mount Lemmon Survey	·	590 m	MPC · JPL
669557	2012 YZ_{9}	—	April 15, 2007	Kitt Peak	Spacewatch	·	720 m	MPC · JPL
669558	2012 YU_{11}	—	September 19, 2011	Mount Lemmon	Mount Lemmon Survey	·	1.9 km	MPC · JPL
669559	2012 YM_{12}	—	July 12, 2016	Haleakala	Pan-STARRS 1	EOS	1.4 km	MPC · JPL
669560	2012 YN_{12}	—	September 14, 2017	Haleakala	Pan-STARRS 1	·	1.7 km	MPC · JPL
669561	2012 YR_{12}	—	December 23, 2012	Haleakala	Pan-STARRS 1	·	1.5 km	MPC · JPL
669562	2012 YW_{15}	—	September 2, 2016	Mount Lemmon	Mount Lemmon Survey	·	1.5 km	MPC · JPL
669563	2012 YX_{15}	—	May 3, 2014	Mount Lemmon	Mount Lemmon Survey	BRA	1.3 km	MPC · JPL
669564	2012 YR_{17}	—	December 23, 2012	Haleakala	Pan-STARRS 1	·	2.0 km	MPC · JPL
669565	2012 YQ_{18}	—	December 23, 2012	Haleakala	Pan-STARRS 1	EOS	1.6 km	MPC · JPL
669566	2012 YX_{21}	—	December 22, 2012	Haleakala	Pan-STARRS 1	EOS	1.6 km	MPC · JPL
669567	2012 YY_{21}	—	November 19, 2006	Catalina	CSS	·	2.1 km	MPC · JPL
669568	2012 YT_{22}	—	December 22, 2012	Haleakala	Pan-STARRS 1	EOS	1.4 km	MPC · JPL
669569	2012 YU_{22}	—	December 23, 2012	Haleakala	Pan-STARRS 1	·	2.0 km	MPC · JPL
669570	2012 YS_{23}	—	December 23, 2012	Haleakala	Pan-STARRS 1	L4	7.8 km	MPC · JPL
669571	2013 AM_{1}	—	December 14, 2003	Palomar	NEAT	EUN	1.1 km	MPC · JPL
669572	2013 AX_{1}	—	January 2, 2013	Oukaïmeden	C. Rinner	PHO	690 m	MPC · JPL
669573	2013 AM_{2}	—	December 8, 2012	Mount Lemmon	Mount Lemmon Survey	EOS	1.6 km	MPC · JPL
669574	2013 AM_{3}	—	February 13, 2004	Kitt Peak	Spacewatch	·	2.5 km	MPC · JPL
669575	2013 AM_{4}	—	December 8, 2012	Mount Lemmon	Mount Lemmon Survey	·	2.7 km	MPC · JPL
669576	2013 AJ_{5}	—	January 1, 2009	Kitt Peak	Spacewatch	·	1.5 km	MPC · JPL
669577	2013 AQ_{9}	—	October 7, 2008	Kitt Peak	Spacewatch	NYS	770 m	MPC · JPL
669578	2013 AQ_{11}	—	October 11, 2007	Kitt Peak	Spacewatch	·	1.7 km	MPC · JPL
669579	2013 AX_{11}	—	November 2, 2007	Kitt Peak	Spacewatch	·	1.7 km	MPC · JPL
669580	2013 AD_{12}	—	November 26, 2012	Mount Lemmon	Mount Lemmon Survey	BRA	1.4 km	MPC · JPL
669581	2013 AU_{17}	—	September 24, 2011	Catalina	CSS	·	2.3 km	MPC · JPL
669582	2013 AN_{18}	—	January 5, 2013	Mount Lemmon	Mount Lemmon Survey	·	710 m	MPC · JPL
669583	2013 AB_{19}	—	September 27, 2012	Haleakala	Pan-STARRS 1	·	2.2 km	MPC · JPL
669584	2013 AP_{19}	—	January 5, 2013	Mount Lemmon	Mount Lemmon Survey	·	2.2 km	MPC · JPL
669585	2013 AR_{19}	—	February 2, 2008	Mount Lemmon	Mount Lemmon Survey	·	1.9 km	MPC · JPL
669586	2013 AJ_{21}	—	January 3, 2013	Haleakala	Pan-STARRS 1	·	1.7 km	MPC · JPL
669587	2013 AY_{23}	—	September 5, 2007	Catalina	CSS	·	1.5 km	MPC · JPL
669588 Pazura	2013 AS_{24}	Pazura	January 4, 2013	Tincana	M. Kusiak, M. Żołnowski	·	3.4 km	MPC · JPL
669589	2013 AH_{25}	—	May 23, 2001	Cerro Tololo	Deep Ecliptic Survey	V	460 m	MPC · JPL
669590	2013 AY_{26}	—	October 6, 2002	Haleakala	NEAT	·	1.8 km	MPC · JPL
669591	2013 AB_{31}	—	September 2, 2002	Kitt Peak	Spacewatch	·	1.7 km	MPC · JPL
669592	2013 AN_{31}	—	December 18, 2007	Mount Lemmon	Mount Lemmon Survey	·	1.2 km	MPC · JPL
669593	2013 AM_{33}	—	November 6, 2007	Kitt Peak	Spacewatch	·	1.6 km	MPC · JPL
669594	2013 AA_{34}	—	November 7, 2007	Mount Lemmon	Mount Lemmon Survey	·	2.7 km	MPC · JPL
669595	2013 AB_{35}	—	January 3, 2013	Catalina	CSS	·	1.5 km	MPC · JPL
669596	2013 AV_{36}	—	October 20, 2012	Mount Lemmon	Mount Lemmon Survey	L4	9.5 km	MPC · JPL
669597	2013 AP_{37}	—	December 9, 2012	Mount Lemmon	Mount Lemmon Survey	EOS	1.4 km	MPC · JPL
669598	2013 AY_{37}	—	September 27, 2012	Haleakala	Pan-STARRS 1	·	1.9 km	MPC · JPL
669599	2013 AE_{38}	—	February 9, 2008	Kitt Peak	Spacewatch	·	1.2 km	MPC · JPL
669600	2013 AN_{39}	—	January 5, 2013	Kitt Peak	Spacewatch	·	2.7 km	MPC · JPL

== 669601–669700 ==
back to top

Designation			Discovery			Properties		Ref
Permanent	Provisional	Named after	Date	Site	Discoverer(s)	Category	Diam.	Ref
669601	2013 AV_{39}	—	January 5, 2013	Kitt Peak	Spacewatch	·	2.8 km	MPC · JPL
669602	2013 AZ_{42}	—	October 1, 2011	Charleston	R. Holmes	·	2.1 km	MPC · JPL
669603	2013 AA_{49}	—	December 12, 2012	Mount Lemmon	Mount Lemmon Survey	·	2.3 km	MPC · JPL
669604	2013 AQ_{50}	—	January 8, 2013	Haleakala	Pan-STARRS 1	H	500 m	MPC · JPL
669605	2013 AJ_{51}	—	May 11, 2008	Mount Lemmon	Mount Lemmon Survey	·	1.7 km	MPC · JPL
669606	2013 AF_{52}	—	January 8, 2013	Marly	P. Kocher	·	2.2 km	MPC · JPL
669607	2013 AV_{52}	—	December 22, 2012	Haleakala	Pan-STARRS 1	·	1.8 km	MPC · JPL
669608	2013 AW_{52}	—	January 6, 2013	Catalina	CSS	APO	350 m	MPC · JPL
669609	2013 AL_{56}	—	October 16, 2006	Catalina	CSS	·	2.3 km	MPC · JPL
669610	2013 AU_{57}	—	January 15, 2005	Kitt Peak	Spacewatch	·	950 m	MPC · JPL
669611	2013 AW_{59}	—	March 4, 2000	Apache Point	SDSS Collaboration	·	910 m	MPC · JPL
669612	2013 AH_{64}	—	December 13, 2012	Kitt Peak	Spacewatch	H	410 m	MPC · JPL
669613	2013 AQ_{64}	—	July 8, 2010	Bergisch Gladbach	W. Bickel	HNS	1.3 km	MPC · JPL
669614	2013 AJ_{67}	—	January 6, 2013	Mount Lemmon	Mount Lemmon Survey	·	1.4 km	MPC · JPL
669615	2013 AH_{70}	—	January 9, 2013	Kitt Peak	Spacewatch	H	420 m	MPC · JPL
669616	2013 AG_{72}	—	September 29, 2006	Anderson Mesa	LONEOS	·	2.1 km	MPC · JPL
669617	2013 AL_{72}	—	December 15, 2009	Catalina	CSS	H	620 m	MPC · JPL
669618	2013 AM_{72}	—	October 25, 2012	Charleston	R. Holmes	·	1.6 km	MPC · JPL
669619	2013 AV_{79}	—	September 29, 2008	Mount Lemmon	Mount Lemmon Survey	·	680 m	MPC · JPL
669620	2013 AW_{82}	—	October 7, 2008	Mount Lemmon	Mount Lemmon Survey	·	800 m	MPC · JPL
669621	2013 AT_{90}	—	January 7, 2013	Kitt Peak	Spacewatch	·	3.5 km	MPC · JPL
669622	2013 AY_{92}	—	September 26, 2011	Haleakala	Pan-STARRS 1	·	2.3 km	MPC · JPL
669623	2013 AG_{94}	—	January 10, 2013	Kitt Peak	Spacewatch	H	400 m	MPC · JPL
669624	2013 AJ_{94}	—	January 6, 2013	Piszkéstető	K. Sárneczky	HNS	1.1 km	MPC · JPL
669625	2013 AB_{95}	—	January 16, 2004	Palomar	NEAT	·	2.1 km	MPC · JPL
669626	2013 AZ_{95}	—	December 23, 2012	Haleakala	Pan-STARRS 1	·	1.5 km	MPC · JPL
669627	2013 AJ_{96}	—	December 8, 2012	Nogales	M. Schwartz, P. R. Holvorcem	·	3.4 km	MPC · JPL
669628	2013 AU_{99}	—	January 6, 2013	Kitt Peak	Spacewatch	·	1.7 km	MPC · JPL
669629	2013 AK_{101}	—	December 9, 2012	Kitt Peak	Spacewatch	·	1.8 km	MPC · JPL
669630	2013 AP_{101}	—	January 13, 2013	Catalina	CSS	H	580 m	MPC · JPL
669631	2013 AD_{103}	—	December 30, 2007	Kitt Peak	Spacewatch	·	1.6 km	MPC · JPL
669632	2013 AV_{105}	—	January 10, 2013	Haleakala	Pan-STARRS 1	·	1.8 km	MPC · JPL
669633	2013 AK_{106}	—	December 9, 2012	Mount Lemmon	Mount Lemmon Survey	·	2.0 km	MPC · JPL
669634	2013 AW_{108}	—	January 10, 2013	Haleakala	Pan-STARRS 1	EOS	1.4 km	MPC · JPL
669635	2013 AU_{109}	—	December 2, 2002	Socorro	LINEAR	·	2.2 km	MPC · JPL
669636	2013 AR_{111}	—	January 13, 2013	ESA OGS	ESA OGS	·	3.0 km	MPC · JPL
669637	2013 AF_{115}	—	November 13, 2012	Mount Lemmon	Mount Lemmon Survey	·	690 m	MPC · JPL
669638	2013 AY_{116}	—	March 23, 2003	Apache Point	SDSS Collaboration	·	730 m	MPC · JPL
669639	2013 AC_{117}	—	October 8, 2004	Kitt Peak	Spacewatch	V	860 m	MPC · JPL
669640	2013 AE_{117}	—	January 26, 2006	Catalina	CSS	·	640 m	MPC · JPL
669641	2013 AT_{119}	—	December 10, 2012	Kitt Peak	Spacewatch	·	2.4 km	MPC · JPL
669642	2013 AF_{121}	—	August 31, 2011	Piszkéstető	K. Sárneczky	·	2.6 km	MPC · JPL
669643	2013 AR_{122}	—	October 23, 2011	Haleakala	Pan-STARRS 1	·	2.9 km	MPC · JPL
669644	2013 AR_{123}	—	January 14, 2013	ESA OGS	ESA OGS	·	2.2 km	MPC · JPL
669645	2013 AH_{124}	—	August 8, 2005	Cerro Tololo	Deep Ecliptic Survey	AGN	1.1 km	MPC · JPL
669646	2013 AQ_{131}	—	October 18, 2012	Mount Lemmon	Mount Lemmon Survey	·	1.4 km	MPC · JPL
669647	2013 AJ_{133}	—	January 7, 2013	Kitt Peak	Spacewatch	L4	7.0 km	MPC · JPL
669648	2013 AO_{137}	—	January 10, 2013	Haleakala	Pan-STARRS 1	·	2.6 km	MPC · JPL
669649	2013 AE_{140}	—	January 4, 2013	Cerro Tololo-DECam	DECam	·	2.1 km	MPC · JPL
669650	2013 AJ_{140}	—	October 29, 2003	Anderson Mesa	LONEOS	·	1.5 km	MPC · JPL
669651	2013 AM_{142}	—	January 4, 2013	Cerro Tololo-DECam	DECam	·	1.7 km	MPC · JPL
669652	2013 AQ_{142}	—	September 27, 2006	Mount Lemmon	Mount Lemmon Survey	·	1.5 km	MPC · JPL
669653	2013 AJ_{143}	—	January 20, 2013	Mount Lemmon	Mount Lemmon Survey	·	1.7 km	MPC · JPL
669654	2013 AH_{145}	—	April 18, 2005	Kitt Peak	Spacewatch	·	1.9 km	MPC · JPL
669655	2013 AQ_{147}	—	January 4, 2013	Cerro Tololo-DECam	DECam	·	730 m	MPC · JPL
669656	2013 AM_{148}	—	January 4, 2013	Cerro Tololo-DECam	DECam	·	2.1 km	MPC · JPL
669657	2013 AS_{148}	—	January 4, 2013	Cerro Tololo-DECam	DECam	·	1.7 km	MPC · JPL
669658	2013 AK_{149}	—	February 10, 2013	Haleakala	Pan-STARRS 1	·	2.0 km	MPC · JPL
669659	2013 AQ_{149}	—	August 31, 2005	Kitt Peak	Spacewatch	·	2.4 km	MPC · JPL
669660	2013 AV_{154}	—	October 19, 2011	Kitt Peak	Spacewatch	·	1.8 km	MPC · JPL
669661	2013 AX_{155}	—	January 4, 2013	Cerro Tololo-DECam	DECam	·	2.3 km	MPC · JPL
669662	2013 AO_{156}	—	January 4, 2013	Cerro Tololo-DECam	DECam	·	1.5 km	MPC · JPL
669663	2013 AL_{160}	—	February 10, 2013	Haleakala	Pan-STARRS 1	·	1.3 km	MPC · JPL
669664	2013 AK_{161}	—	January 4, 2013	Cerro Tololo-DECam	DECam	EOS	1.4 km	MPC · JPL
669665	2013 AY_{166}	—	January 18, 2013	XuYi	PMO NEO Survey Program	·	600 m	MPC · JPL
669666	2013 AT_{168}	—	February 10, 2013	Haleakala	Pan-STARRS 1	·	1.5 km	MPC · JPL
669667	2013 AZ_{168}	—	January 20, 2013	Mount Lemmon	Mount Lemmon Survey	·	1.8 km	MPC · JPL
669668	2013 AT_{177}	—	January 5, 2013	Cerro Tololo-DECam	DECam	·	1.9 km	MPC · JPL
669669	2013 AV_{180}	—	October 23, 2006	Kitt Peak	Spacewatch	·	1.3 km	MPC · JPL
669670	2013 AZ_{181}	—	February 28, 2008	Mount Lemmon	Mount Lemmon Survey	·	3.1 km	MPC · JPL
669671	2013 AW_{182}	—	February 22, 2003	Palomar	NEAT	·	1.5 km	MPC · JPL
669672	2013 AQ_{184}	—	November 13, 2012	Mount Lemmon	Mount Lemmon Survey	·	1.7 km	MPC · JPL
669673	2013 AE_{185}	—	February 28, 2008	Mount Lemmon	Mount Lemmon Survey	·	1.9 km	MPC · JPL
669674	2013 AG_{185}	—	January 10, 2013	Haleakala	Pan-STARRS 1	·	2.0 km	MPC · JPL
669675	2013 AP_{185}	—	January 31, 2009	Mount Lemmon	Mount Lemmon Survey	·	1.4 km	MPC · JPL
669676	2013 AK_{186}	—	January 5, 2013	Kitt Peak	Spacewatch	·	2.3 km	MPC · JPL
669677	2013 AH_{187}	—	January 10, 2013	Haleakala	Pan-STARRS 1	·	2.4 km	MPC · JPL
669678	2013 AF_{189}	—	January 10, 2013	Mount Lemmon	Mount Lemmon Survey	TIR	2.4 km	MPC · JPL
669679	2013 AL_{189}	—	January 8, 2013	Kitt Peak	Spacewatch	·	1.1 km	MPC · JPL
669680	2013 AO_{189}	—	July 19, 2015	Haleakala	Pan-STARRS 1	·	2.0 km	MPC · JPL
669681	2013 AG_{190}	—	January 10, 2013	Haleakala	Pan-STARRS 1	·	2.2 km	MPC · JPL
669682	2013 AB_{191}	—	January 13, 2013	Mount Lemmon	Mount Lemmon Survey	·	2.4 km	MPC · JPL
669683	2013 AG_{192}	—	January 10, 2013	Haleakala	Pan-STARRS 1	·	2.4 km	MPC · JPL
669684	2013 AF_{193}	—	January 7, 2013	Haleakala	Pan-STARRS 1	·	2.6 km	MPC · JPL
669685	2013 AP_{193}	—	November 27, 2017	Mount Lemmon	Mount Lemmon Survey	EOS	1.6 km	MPC · JPL
669686	2013 AQ_{194}	—	January 10, 2013	Kitt Peak	Spacewatch	L4	7.6 km	MPC · JPL
669687	2013 AX_{194}	—	August 30, 2016	Haleakala	Pan-STARRS 1	·	2.5 km	MPC · JPL
669688	2013 AC_{195}	—	June 17, 2015	Haleakala	Pan-STARRS 1	·	700 m	MPC · JPL
669689	2013 AS_{195}	—	January 10, 2013	Haleakala	Pan-STARRS 1	·	770 m	MPC · JPL
669690	2013 AJ_{196}	—	January 10, 2013	Haleakala	Pan-STARRS 1	·	770 m	MPC · JPL
669691	2013 AX_{196}	—	January 13, 2013	Mount Lemmon	Mount Lemmon Survey	·	540 m	MPC · JPL
669692	2013 AP_{197}	—	January 9, 2013	Mount Lemmon	Mount Lemmon Survey	·	770 m	MPC · JPL
669693	2013 AY_{202}	—	January 10, 2013	Haleakala	Pan-STARRS 1	·	2.2 km	MPC · JPL
669694	2013 AZ_{203}	—	January 10, 2013	Haleakala	Pan-STARRS 1	EOS	1.3 km	MPC · JPL
669695	2013 AH_{204}	—	January 6, 2013	Kitt Peak	Spacewatch	·	2.3 km	MPC · JPL
669696	2013 AJ_{204}	—	January 10, 2013	Haleakala	Pan-STARRS 1	EOS	1.4 km	MPC · JPL
669697	2013 AG_{205}	—	January 6, 2013	Kitt Peak	Spacewatch	L4	7.5 km	MPC · JPL
669698	2013 AN_{207}	—	January 3, 2013	Mount Lemmon	Mount Lemmon Survey	·	1.9 km	MPC · JPL
669699	2013 BX	—	January 6, 2013	Kitt Peak	Spacewatch	L4	9.5 km	MPC · JPL
669700	2013 BD_{7}	—	June 13, 2010	Mount Lemmon	Mount Lemmon Survey	·	2.0 km	MPC · JPL

== 669701–669800 ==
back to top

Designation			Discovery			Properties		Ref
Permanent	Provisional	Named after	Date	Site	Discoverer(s)	Category	Diam.	Ref
669701	2013 BL_{7}	—	January 16, 2013	Catalina	CSS	·	1.0 km	MPC · JPL
669702	2013 BT_{7}	—	January 31, 2009	Mount Lemmon	Mount Lemmon Survey	·	1.8 km	MPC · JPL
669703	2013 BM_{15}	—	January 4, 2013	Kitt Peak	Spacewatch	·	2.0 km	MPC · JPL
669704	2013 BO_{15}	—	November 3, 2011	Kitt Peak	Spacewatch	·	2.6 km	MPC · JPL
669705	2013 BD_{16}	—	November 4, 2010	Mount Lemmon	Mount Lemmon Survey	L4	6.8 km	MPC · JPL
669706	2013 BM_{17}	—	January 18, 2013	Haleakala	Pan-STARRS 1	·	2.1 km	MPC · JPL
669707	2013 BS_{17}	—	December 12, 2012	Mount Lemmon	Mount Lemmon Survey	L4	6.4 km	MPC · JPL
669708	2013 BP_{20}	—	November 11, 2007	Mount Lemmon	Mount Lemmon Survey	·	2.3 km	MPC · JPL
669709	2013 BF_{22}	—	November 19, 2003	Palomar	NEAT	·	1.6 km	MPC · JPL
669710	2013 BZ_{22}	—	December 23, 2000	Apache Point	SDSS	·	1.1 km	MPC · JPL
669711	2013 BS_{26}	—	January 18, 2013	Haleakala	Pan-STARRS 1	H	410 m	MPC · JPL
669712	2013 BD_{28}	—	January 3, 2013	Haleakala	Pan-STARRS 1	L4	10 km	MPC · JPL
669713	2013 BQ_{30}	—	January 16, 2013	Haleakala	Pan-STARRS 1	·	2.3 km	MPC · JPL
669714	2013 BR_{32}	—	January 16, 2013	Haleakala	Pan-STARRS 1	·	1.7 km	MPC · JPL
669715	2013 BJ_{34}	—	November 19, 2008	Kitt Peak	Spacewatch	·	900 m	MPC · JPL
669716	2013 BE_{39}	—	October 19, 2006	Kitt Peak	Deep Ecliptic Survey	·	1.5 km	MPC · JPL
669717	2013 BR_{39}	—	May 14, 2010	Palomar	Palomar Transient Factory	·	850 m	MPC · JPL
669718	2013 BZ_{44}	—	January 18, 2013	Haleakala	Pan-STARRS 1	L4	7.9 km	MPC · JPL
669719	2013 BG_{49}	—	February 3, 2009	Mount Lemmon	Mount Lemmon Survey	·	1.7 km	MPC · JPL
669720	2013 BX_{52}	—	October 31, 2007	Mount Lemmon	Mount Lemmon Survey	·	1.6 km	MPC · JPL
669721	2013 BH_{54}	—	January 17, 2013	Kitt Peak	Spacewatch	·	2.3 km	MPC · JPL
669722	2013 BV_{57}	—	January 5, 2013	Mount Lemmon	Mount Lemmon Survey	·	2.1 km	MPC · JPL
669723	2013 BG_{58}	—	January 8, 2013	Oukaïmeden	M. Ory	·	2.0 km	MPC · JPL
669724	2013 BA_{60}	—	December 18, 2007	Mount Lemmon	Mount Lemmon Survey	·	1.9 km	MPC · JPL
669725	2013 BS_{61}	—	September 17, 2006	Catalina	CSS	·	1.7 km	MPC · JPL
669726	2013 BB_{64}	—	January 18, 2013	Kitt Peak	Spacewatch	·	2.6 km	MPC · JPL
669727	2013 BE_{65}	—	July 25, 2011	Haleakala	Pan-STARRS 1	H	440 m	MPC · JPL
669728	2013 BO_{65}	—	January 19, 2013	Kitt Peak	Spacewatch	·	1.4 km	MPC · JPL
669729	2013 BS_{65}	—	November 19, 2008	Mount Lemmon	Mount Lemmon Survey	·	940 m	MPC · JPL
669730	2013 BF_{66}	—	October 28, 2008	Kitt Peak	Spacewatch	NYS	660 m	MPC · JPL
669731	2013 BU_{66}	—	January 8, 2013	Haleakala	Pan-STARRS 1	H	380 m	MPC · JPL
669732	2013 BQ_{71}	—	November 24, 2003	Palomar	NEAT	·	1.7 km	MPC · JPL
669733	2013 BS_{71}	—	January 9, 2013	Nogales	M. Schwartz, P. R. Holvorcem	PHO	820 m	MPC · JPL
669734	2013 BT_{71}	—	January 3, 2013	Mount Lemmon	Mount Lemmon Survey	H	310 m	MPC · JPL
669735	2013 BY_{77}	—	February 7, 2002	Palomar	NEAT	·	3.2 km	MPC · JPL
669736	2013 BB_{78}	—	January 17, 2013	Kitt Peak	Spacewatch	PHO	690 m	MPC · JPL
669737	2013 BX_{79}	—	January 11, 2013	Haleakala	Pan-STARRS 1	H	400 m	MPC · JPL
669738	2013 BX_{80}	—	January 22, 2013	Mount Lemmon	Mount Lemmon Survey	·	2.9 km	MPC · JPL
669739	2013 BH_{81}	—	September 29, 2011	Les Engarouines	L. Bernasconi	·	2.4 km	MPC · JPL
669740	2013 BQ_{82}	—	August 30, 2016	Mount Lemmon	Mount Lemmon Survey	·	2.3 km	MPC · JPL
669741	2013 BK_{84}	—	January 20, 2013	Kitt Peak	Spacewatch	·	1.6 km	MPC · JPL
669742	2013 BP_{84}	—	January 20, 2013	Kitt Peak	Spacewatch	EOS	1.8 km	MPC · JPL
669743	2013 BT_{85}	—	January 19, 2013	Mount Lemmon	Mount Lemmon Survey	·	3.4 km	MPC · JPL
669744	2013 BZ_{85}	—	January 20, 2013	Kitt Peak	Spacewatch	·	2.8 km	MPC · JPL
669745	2013 BL_{88}	—	January 20, 2013	Kitt Peak	Spacewatch	·	2.4 km	MPC · JPL
669746	2013 BT_{88}	—	January 16, 2013	Catalina	CSS	·	2.5 km	MPC · JPL
669747	2013 BY_{88}	—	January 20, 2013	Mount Lemmon	Mount Lemmon Survey	·	2.3 km	MPC · JPL
669748	2013 BB_{89}	—	January 19, 2013	Kitt Peak	Spacewatch	·	3.1 km	MPC · JPL
669749	2013 BG_{89}	—	May 24, 2014	Haleakala	Pan-STARRS 1	·	2.8 km	MPC · JPL
669750	2013 BT_{91}	—	September 26, 2011	Mayhill-ISON	L. Elenin	·	1.0 km	MPC · JPL
669751	2013 BS_{92}	—	January 20, 2013	Mount Lemmon	Mount Lemmon Survey	·	2.1 km	MPC · JPL
669752	2013 BG_{93}	—	January 19, 2013	Mount Lemmon	Mount Lemmon Survey	·	2.2 km	MPC · JPL
669753	2013 BQ_{95}	—	January 17, 2013	Haleakala	Pan-STARRS 1	·	1.9 km	MPC · JPL
669754	2013 BL_{96}	—	January 22, 2013	Mount Lemmon	Mount Lemmon Survey	·	1.4 km	MPC · JPL
669755	2013 BS_{98}	—	January 18, 2013	Mount Lemmon	Mount Lemmon Survey	L4	6.1 km	MPC · JPL
669756	2013 BV_{98}	—	January 17, 2013	Haleakala	Pan-STARRS 1	·	1.6 km	MPC · JPL
669757	2013 BY_{98}	—	January 19, 2013	Kitt Peak	Spacewatch	·	880 m	MPC · JPL
669758	2013 BT_{100}	—	January 18, 2013	Haleakala	Pan-STARRS 1	·	1.8 km	MPC · JPL
669759	2013 BT_{101}	—	January 18, 2013	Mount Lemmon	Mount Lemmon Survey	L4	6.2 km	MPC · JPL
669760	2013 BZ_{103}	—	January 22, 2013	Mount Lemmon	Mount Lemmon Survey	·	2.6 km	MPC · JPL
669761	2013 BX_{105}	—	January 20, 2013	Mount Lemmon	Mount Lemmon Survey	EOS	1.6 km	MPC · JPL
669762	2013 BE_{106}	—	January 19, 2013	Kitt Peak	Spacewatch	·	2.4 km	MPC · JPL
669763	2013 BH_{107}	—	January 17, 2013	Haleakala	Pan-STARRS 1	·	1.7 km	MPC · JPL
669764	2013 BM_{107}	—	January 16, 2013	Haleakala	Pan-STARRS 1	EOS	1.7 km	MPC · JPL
669765	2013 BT_{109}	—	January 17, 2013	Haleakala	Pan-STARRS 1	·	1.1 km	MPC · JPL
669766	2013 CL_{1}	—	January 17, 2013	Kitt Peak	Spacewatch	H	430 m	MPC · JPL
669767	2013 CN_{1}	—	January 17, 2013	Catalina	CSS	H	610 m	MPC · JPL
669768	2013 CA_{3}	—	February 17, 2004	La Silla	Barbieri, C.	·	2.3 km	MPC · JPL
669769	2013 CU_{4}	—	September 23, 2011	Haleakala	Pan-STARRS 1	·	1.7 km	MPC · JPL
669770	2013 CA_{6}	—	September 20, 2011	Kitt Peak	Spacewatch	·	1.4 km	MPC · JPL
669771	2013 CY_{7}	—	January 10, 2013	Haleakala	Pan-STARRS 1	·	2.1 km	MPC · JPL
669772	2013 CJ_{11}	—	October 3, 2002	Palomar	NEAT	·	2.0 km	MPC · JPL
669773	2013 CM_{11}	—	January 1, 2012	Mount Lemmon	Mount Lemmon Survey	L4	7.0 km	MPC · JPL
669774	2013 CN_{20}	—	January 5, 2013	Kitt Peak	Spacewatch	·	1.5 km	MPC · JPL
669775	2013 CL_{21}	—	December 21, 2012	Mount Lemmon	Mount Lemmon Survey	·	900 m	MPC · JPL
669776	2013 CP_{24}	—	February 2, 2013	Mount Lemmon	Mount Lemmon Survey	·	960 m	MPC · JPL
669777	2013 CV_{25}	—	August 29, 2006	Catalina	CSS	·	1.8 km	MPC · JPL
669778	2013 CJ_{27}	—	February 3, 2013	Haleakala	Pan-STARRS 1	·	2.2 km	MPC · JPL
669779	2013 CU_{28}	—	May 10, 2005	Kitt Peak	Spacewatch	·	1.5 km	MPC · JPL
669780	2013 CZ_{28}	—	February 5, 2013	Oukaïmeden	C. Rinner	·	870 m	MPC · JPL
669781	2013 CF_{30}	—	February 5, 2013	Mount Lemmon	Mount Lemmon Survey	·	670 m	MPC · JPL
669782	2013 CJ_{37}	—	January 17, 2013	Mount Lemmon	Mount Lemmon Survey	·	1.9 km	MPC · JPL
669783	2013 CV_{38}	—	February 7, 2013	ASC-Kislovodsk	ASC-Kislovodsk	·	1.2 km	MPC · JPL
669784	2013 CY_{38}	—	February 7, 2002	Kitt Peak	Spacewatch	H	430 m	MPC · JPL
669785	2013 CE_{40}	—	January 17, 2013	Mount Lemmon	Mount Lemmon Survey	·	2.9 km	MPC · JPL
669786	2013 CM_{40}	—	January 9, 2013	Kitt Peak	Spacewatch	·	1.6 km	MPC · JPL
669787	2013 CR_{40}	—	January 22, 2013	Mount Lemmon	Mount Lemmon Survey	·	1.1 km	MPC · JPL
669788	2013 CJ_{44}	—	March 30, 2008	Kitt Peak	Spacewatch	·	2.1 km	MPC · JPL
669789	2013 CT_{44}	—	October 24, 2005	Mauna Kea	A. Boattini	·	740 m	MPC · JPL
669790	2013 CC_{45}	—	February 5, 2013	Kitt Peak	Spacewatch	·	2.5 km	MPC · JPL
669791	2013 CB_{47}	—	February 5, 2013	Mount Lemmon	Mount Lemmon Survey	·	2.3 km	MPC · JPL
669792	2013 CE_{49}	—	September 23, 2008	Kitt Peak	Spacewatch	MAS	490 m	MPC · JPL
669793	2013 CP_{54}	—	March 5, 2006	Kitt Peak	Spacewatch	·	860 m	MPC · JPL
669794	2013 CQ_{55}	—	February 8, 2013	Kitt Peak	Spacewatch	EOS	1.7 km	MPC · JPL
669795	2013 CZ_{55}	—	September 24, 2011	Mayhill-ISON	L. Elenin	LIX	2.5 km	MPC · JPL
669796	2013 CA_{56}	—	February 8, 2013	Haleakala	Pan-STARRS 1	L4	6.8 km	MPC · JPL
669797	2013 CB_{56}	—	January 31, 2013	Kitt Peak	Spacewatch	URS	2.9 km	MPC · JPL
669798	2013 CC_{56}	—	February 8, 2013	Haleakala	Pan-STARRS 1	·	2.2 km	MPC · JPL
669799	2013 CJ_{56}	—	February 8, 2013	Haleakala	Pan-STARRS 1	·	1.7 km	MPC · JPL
669800	2013 CT_{56}	—	September 19, 2003	Palomar	NEAT	H	550 m	MPC · JPL

== 669801–669900 ==
back to top

Designation			Discovery			Properties		Ref
Permanent	Provisional	Named after	Date	Site	Discoverer(s)	Category	Diam.	Ref
669801	2013 CB_{57}	—	May 10, 2005	Mount Lemmon	Mount Lemmon Survey	·	1.7 km	MPC · JPL
669802	2013 CN_{59}	—	February 2, 2013	Haleakala	Pan-STARRS 1	PHO	830 m	MPC · JPL
669803	2013 CP_{59}	—	November 15, 2007	Mount Lemmon	Mount Lemmon Survey	·	2.0 km	MPC · JPL
669804	2013 CC_{60}	—	February 3, 2013	Haleakala	Pan-STARRS 1	·	2.1 km	MPC · JPL
669805	2013 CG_{61}	—	December 20, 2012	Mount Lemmon	Mount Lemmon Survey	·	2.7 km	MPC · JPL
669806	2013 CP_{61}	—	December 8, 2012	Mount Lemmon	Mount Lemmon Survey	H	480 m	MPC · JPL
669807	2013 CG_{68}	—	February 8, 2013	Haleakala	Pan-STARRS 1	·	2.4 km	MPC · JPL
669808	2013 CL_{69}	—	December 8, 2012	Mount Lemmon	Mount Lemmon Survey	·	2.2 km	MPC · JPL
669809	2013 CQ_{70}	—	February 1, 2013	Mount Lemmon	Mount Lemmon Survey	·	2.1 km	MPC · JPL
669810	2013 CG_{73}	—	January 10, 2013	Kitt Peak	Spacewatch	·	2.1 km	MPC · JPL
669811	2013 CQ_{74}	—	January 7, 2013	Kitt Peak	Spacewatch	L4	10 km	MPC · JPL
669812	2013 CU_{74}	—	February 26, 2008	Mount Lemmon	Mount Lemmon Survey	EOS	1.9 km	MPC · JPL
669813	2013 CC_{75}	—	December 8, 2012	Mount Lemmon	Mount Lemmon Survey	·	2.5 km	MPC · JPL
669814	2013 CU_{76}	—	January 5, 2013	Mount Lemmon	Mount Lemmon Survey	URS	3.2 km	MPC · JPL
669815	2013 CH_{79}	—	November 9, 2007	Kitt Peak	Spacewatch	EUN	1.3 km	MPC · JPL
669816	2013 CR_{81}	—	February 8, 2013	Haleakala	Pan-STARRS 1	·	1.5 km	MPC · JPL
669817	2013 CZ_{81}	—	February 8, 2013	Haleakala	Pan-STARRS 1	·	880 m	MPC · JPL
669818	2013 CJ_{87}	—	November 24, 2011	Mount Lemmon	Mount Lemmon Survey	EOS	1.6 km	MPC · JPL
669819	2013 CT_{88}	—	February 13, 2013	Haleakala	Pan-STARRS 1	BAR	820 m	MPC · JPL
669820	2013 CX_{89}	—	February 6, 2013	Kitt Peak	Spacewatch	·	920 m	MPC · JPL
669821	2013 CB_{91}	—	February 8, 2013	Mount Lemmon	Mount Lemmon Survey	·	1.9 km	MPC · JPL
669822	2013 CT_{93}	—	February 8, 2013	Haleakala	Pan-STARRS 1	·	1.1 km	MPC · JPL
669823	2013 CD_{98}	—	February 8, 2013	Haleakala	Pan-STARRS 1	·	2.1 km	MPC · JPL
669824	2013 CE_{99}	—	August 29, 2005	Kitt Peak	Spacewatch	·	2.1 km	MPC · JPL
669825	2013 CZ_{99}	—	October 23, 2011	Haleakala	Pan-STARRS 1	·	1.8 km	MPC · JPL
669826	2013 CK_{100}	—	December 29, 2011	Mount Lemmon	Mount Lemmon Survey	L4	7.8 km	MPC · JPL
669827	2013 CB_{102}	—	January 14, 2013	Nogales	M. Schwartz, P. R. Holvorcem	·	2.3 km	MPC · JPL
669828	2013 CU_{103}	—	February 9, 2013	Haleakala	Pan-STARRS 1	·	2.4 km	MPC · JPL
669829	2013 CR_{104}	—	February 9, 2013	Haleakala	Pan-STARRS 1	·	1.9 km	MPC · JPL
669830	2013 CN_{105}	—	November 2, 2011	Mount Lemmon	Mount Lemmon Survey	·	2.1 km	MPC · JPL
669831	2013 CM_{108}	—	March 28, 2008	Mount Lemmon	Mount Lemmon Survey	·	1.7 km	MPC · JPL
669832	2013 CB_{109}	—	February 9, 2013	Haleakala	Pan-STARRS 1	·	2.4 km	MPC · JPL
669833	2013 CQ_{112}	—	February 24, 2006	Kitt Peak	Spacewatch	V	480 m	MPC · JPL
669834	2013 CK_{113}	—	February 10, 2013	Haleakala	Pan-STARRS 1	EMA	2.1 km	MPC · JPL
669835	2013 CC_{115}	—	February 12, 2013	ESA OGS	ESA OGS	·	1.7 km	MPC · JPL
669836	2013 CH_{115}	—	February 12, 2013	ESA OGS	ESA OGS	·	2.3 km	MPC · JPL
669837	2013 CH_{118}	—	February 1, 2013	Kitt Peak	Spacewatch	·	2.4 km	MPC · JPL
669838	2013 CQ_{122}	—	February 9, 2013	Haleakala	Pan-STARRS 1	EUP	2.9 km	MPC · JPL
669839	2013 CK_{125}	—	February 13, 2013	ESA OGS	ESA OGS	·	2.5 km	MPC · JPL
669840	2013 CP_{127}	—	February 14, 2013	Oukaïmeden	C. Rinner	PHO	670 m	MPC · JPL
669841	2013 CQ_{129}	—	February 6, 2002	Socorro	LINEAR	T_{j} (2.9)	2.0 km	MPC · JPL
669842	2013 CG_{132}	—	February 14, 2013	Haleakala	Pan-STARRS 1	·	1.7 km	MPC · JPL
669843	2013 CA_{134}	—	February 15, 2013	Haleakala	Pan-STARRS 1	centaur	30 km	MPC · JPL
669844	2013 CM_{134}	—	December 23, 2006	Črni Vrh	Mikuž, H.	T_{j} (2.99) · EUP	3.2 km	MPC · JPL
669845	2013 CY_{137}	—	July 30, 2005	Palomar	NEAT	·	1.6 km	MPC · JPL
669846	2013 CK_{138}	—	January 17, 2013	Mount Lemmon	Mount Lemmon Survey	ERI	1.0 km	MPC · JPL
669847	2013 CO_{138}	—	November 17, 2011	Mayhill-ISON	L. Elenin	·	2.3 km	MPC · JPL
669848	2013 CY_{140}	—	February 14, 2013	Kitt Peak	Spacewatch	·	1.9 km	MPC · JPL
669849	2013 CC_{141}	—	February 14, 2013	Kitt Peak	Spacewatch	·	2.2 km	MPC · JPL
669850	2013 CK_{146}	—	September 16, 2010	Mount Lemmon	Mount Lemmon Survey	·	2.6 km	MPC · JPL
669851	2013 CK_{147}	—	February 14, 2013	Kitt Peak	Spacewatch	·	770 m	MPC · JPL
669852	2013 CH_{148}	—	February 14, 2013	Kitt Peak	Spacewatch	·	2.1 km	MPC · JPL
669853	2013 CH_{149}	—	September 17, 2010	Mount Lemmon	Mount Lemmon Survey	·	2.0 km	MPC · JPL
669854	2013 CK_{151}	—	February 14, 2013	Kitt Peak	Spacewatch	·	2.4 km	MPC · JPL
669855	2013 CR_{151}	—	February 14, 2013	Haleakala	Pan-STARRS 1	·	2.2 km	MPC · JPL
669856	2013 CG_{152}	—	February 7, 2002	Palomar	NEAT	·	870 m	MPC · JPL
669857	2013 CX_{152}	—	January 3, 2012	Mount Lemmon	Mount Lemmon Survey	L4	7.3 km	MPC · JPL
669858	2013 CE_{153}	—	November 3, 2005	Mount Lemmon	Mount Lemmon Survey	·	560 m	MPC · JPL
669859	2013 CG_{153}	—	November 28, 2011	Mount Lemmon	Mount Lemmon Survey	·	1.8 km	MPC · JPL
669860	2013 CJ_{155}	—	February 14, 2013	Haleakala	Pan-STARRS 1	·	3.1 km	MPC · JPL
669861	2013 CK_{155}	—	August 11, 2010	Črni Vrh	Mikuž, B.	·	2.5 km	MPC · JPL
669862	2013 CW_{155}	—	September 4, 2008	Kitt Peak	Spacewatch	L4	6.8 km	MPC · JPL
669863	2013 CU_{157}	—	January 17, 2013	Mount Lemmon	Mount Lemmon Survey	·	760 m	MPC · JPL
669864	2013 CC_{160}	—	February 14, 2013	Haleakala	Pan-STARRS 1	L4	6.4 km	MPC · JPL
669865	2013 CE_{163}	—	February 14, 2013	Haleakala	Pan-STARRS 1	EOS	1.7 km	MPC · JPL
669866	2013 CA_{165}	—	February 14, 2013	Haleakala	Pan-STARRS 1	·	890 m	MPC · JPL
669867	2013 CT_{165}	—	February 14, 2013	Kitt Peak	Spacewatch	·	2.8 km	MPC · JPL
669868	2013 CQ_{166}	—	January 9, 2013	Mount Lemmon	Mount Lemmon Survey	·	2.2 km	MPC · JPL
669869	2013 CW_{167}	—	September 25, 2011	Haleakala	Pan-STARRS 1	·	2.1 km	MPC · JPL
669870	2013 CA_{168}	—	February 14, 2013	Haleakala	Pan-STARRS 1	·	1.8 km	MPC · JPL
669871	2013 CF_{169}	—	February 15, 2013	ESA OGS	ESA OGS	·	2.5 km	MPC · JPL
669872	2013 CU_{171}	—	August 10, 2005	Cerro Tololo	Deep Ecliptic Survey	·	2.0 km	MPC · JPL
669873	2013 CW_{171}	—	February 15, 2013	Haleakala	Pan-STARRS 1	·	2.4 km	MPC · JPL
669874	2013 CZ_{172}	—	February 15, 2013	Haleakala	Pan-STARRS 1	·	2.7 km	MPC · JPL
669875	2013 CC_{173}	—	February 26, 2004	Kitt Peak	Deep Ecliptic Survey	AEO	1.1 km	MPC · JPL
669876	2013 CD_{176}	—	January 9, 2013	Mount Lemmon	Mount Lemmon Survey	·	1.7 km	MPC · JPL
669877	2013 CH_{176}	—	February 14, 2013	Haleakala	Pan-STARRS 1	NYS	1.0 km	MPC · JPL
669878	2013 CX_{176}	—	February 6, 2008	Catalina	CSS	·	1.9 km	MPC · JPL
669879	2013 CD_{177}	—	February 8, 2013	Mount Lemmon	Mount Lemmon Survey	·	2.9 km	MPC · JPL
669880	2013 CN_{178}	—	August 8, 2005	Cerro Tololo	Deep Ecliptic Survey	·	2.4 km	MPC · JPL
669881	2013 CP_{179}	—	January 20, 2013	Kitt Peak	Spacewatch	·	1.9 km	MPC · JPL
669882	2013 CA_{182}	—	December 4, 2007	Kitt Peak	Spacewatch	·	2.0 km	MPC · JPL
669883	2013 CH_{182}	—	February 5, 2013	Oukaïmeden	C. Rinner	·	2.2 km	MPC · JPL
669884	2013 CK_{182}	—	January 10, 2013	Kitt Peak	Spacewatch	·	2.9 km	MPC · JPL
669885	2013 CL_{182}	—	January 19, 2013	Mount Lemmon	Mount Lemmon Survey	·	1.9 km	MPC · JPL
669886	2013 CF_{184}	—	March 2, 2006	Kitt Peak	Spacewatch	PHO	900 m	MPC · JPL
669887	2013 CG_{184}	—	January 14, 2013	Mount Lemmon	Mount Lemmon Survey	EUN	1.1 km	MPC · JPL
669888	2013 CF_{185}	—	February 8, 2013	Mount Lemmon	Mount Lemmon Survey	L4	7.9 km	MPC · JPL
669889	2013 CF_{189}	—	January 20, 2013	Mount Lemmon	Mount Lemmon Survey	·	1.0 km	MPC · JPL
669890	2013 CV_{189}	—	January 10, 2013	Kitt Peak	Spacewatch	EUP	2.5 km	MPC · JPL
669891	2013 CF_{191}	—	April 26, 2003	Kitt Peak	Spacewatch	·	1.9 km	MPC · JPL
669892	2013 CA_{193}	—	February 14, 2013	Mount Lemmon	Mount Lemmon Survey	·	2.0 km	MPC · JPL
669893	2013 CC_{193}	—	January 10, 2008	Mount Lemmon	Mount Lemmon Survey	·	1.9 km	MPC · JPL
669894	2013 CO_{194}	—	February 9, 2013	Haleakala	Pan-STARRS 1	VER	2.1 km	MPC · JPL
669895	2013 CT_{194}	—	February 5, 2013	Kitt Peak	Spacewatch	·	2.4 km	MPC · JPL
669896	2013 CZ_{196}	—	September 15, 2006	Kitt Peak	Spacewatch	·	2.0 km	MPC · JPL
669897	2013 CH_{197}	—	February 10, 2013	Haleakala	Pan-STARRS 1	·	3.1 km	MPC · JPL
669898	2013 CN_{197}	—	February 8, 2013	Haleakala	Pan-STARRS 1	·	2.5 km	MPC · JPL
669899	2013 CO_{198}	—	September 14, 2006	Palomar	NEAT	·	2.5 km	MPC · JPL
669900	2013 CZ_{199}	—	September 30, 2011	Kitt Peak	Spacewatch	·	2.0 km	MPC · JPL

== 669901–670000 ==
back to top

Designation			Discovery			Properties		Ref
Permanent	Provisional	Named after	Date	Site	Discoverer(s)	Category	Diam.	Ref
669901	2013 CL_{202}	—	September 4, 2011	Haleakala	Pan-STARRS 1	THB	1.9 km	MPC · JPL
669902	2013 CU_{204}	—	February 9, 2013	Haleakala	Pan-STARRS 1	·	1.5 km	MPC · JPL
669903	2013 CR_{205}	—	January 10, 2013	Haleakala	Pan-STARRS 1	L4	7.9 km	MPC · JPL
669904	2013 CR_{209}	—	September 26, 2011	Haleakala	Pan-STARRS 1	V	460 m	MPC · JPL
669905	2013 CX_{211}	—	December 3, 2007	Kitt Peak	Spacewatch	·	1.7 km	MPC · JPL
669906	2013 CY_{213}	—	September 30, 2005	Mount Lemmon	Mount Lemmon Survey	ANF	1.4 km	MPC · JPL
669907	2013 CL_{214}	—	February 28, 2008	Mount Lemmon	Mount Lemmon Survey	EOS	1.4 km	MPC · JPL
669908	2013 CR_{215}	—	February 8, 2013	Haleakala	Pan-STARRS 1	·	2.5 km	MPC · JPL
669909	2013 CS_{215}	—	March 11, 2008	Kitt Peak	Spacewatch	·	2.0 km	MPC · JPL
669910	2013 CH_{216}	—	February 8, 2013	Haleakala	Pan-STARRS 1	·	2.4 km	MPC · JPL
669911	2013 CA_{218}	—	January 10, 2007	Kitt Peak	Spacewatch	·	2.4 km	MPC · JPL
669912	2013 CE_{219}	—	January 20, 2013	Kitt Peak	Spacewatch	·	940 m	MPC · JPL
669913	2013 CH_{219}	—	February 9, 2013	Haleakala	Pan-STARRS 1	·	1.5 km	MPC · JPL
669914	2013 CY_{219}	—	November 24, 2011	Mount Lemmon	Mount Lemmon Survey	·	2.3 km	MPC · JPL
669915	2013 CW_{220}	—	February 9, 2013	Haleakala	Pan-STARRS 1	L4	6.5 km	MPC · JPL
669916	2013 CC_{226}	—	February 5, 2013	Kitt Peak	Spacewatch	VER	2.3 km	MPC · JPL
669917	2013 CF_{226}	—	February 6, 2013	Kitt Peak	Spacewatch	·	2.5 km	MPC · JPL
669918	2013 CV_{227}	—	February 15, 2013	Haleakala	Pan-STARRS 1	·	2.6 km	MPC · JPL
669919	2013 CA_{229}	—	December 27, 2006	Mount Lemmon	Mount Lemmon Survey	·	1.9 km	MPC · JPL
669920	2013 CL_{229}	—	February 14, 2013	Mount Lemmon	Mount Lemmon Survey	·	1.8 km	MPC · JPL
669921	2013 CM_{229}	—	February 14, 2013	Haleakala	Pan-STARRS 1	·	2.4 km	MPC · JPL
669922	2013 CP_{229}	—	February 6, 2013	Kitt Peak	Spacewatch	·	2.0 km	MPC · JPL
669923	2013 CQ_{229}	—	August 9, 2016	Haleakala	Pan-STARRS 1	EUP	2.4 km	MPC · JPL
669924	2013 CE_{231}	—	August 3, 2016	Haleakala	Pan-STARRS 1	·	2.2 km	MPC · JPL
669925	2013 CT_{233}	—	February 5, 2013	Mount Lemmon	Mount Lemmon Survey	·	2.1 km	MPC · JPL
669926	2013 CH_{237}	—	February 3, 2013	Haleakala	Pan-STARRS 1	·	2.1 km	MPC · JPL
669927	2013 CN_{237}	—	February 14, 2013	Haleakala	Pan-STARRS 1	·	1.7 km	MPC · JPL
669928	2013 CO_{237}	—	February 14, 2013	Haleakala	Pan-STARRS 1	·	1.7 km	MPC · JPL
669929	2013 CE_{238}	—	November 1, 2015	Kitt Peak	Spacewatch	·	830 m	MPC · JPL
669930	2013 CY_{238}	—	February 14, 2013	Kitt Peak	Spacewatch	·	2.2 km	MPC · JPL
669931	2013 CN_{239}	—	February 14, 2013	Haleakala	Pan-STARRS 1	·	1.9 km	MPC · JPL
669932	2013 CR_{240}	—	February 14, 2013	Haleakala	Pan-STARRS 1	·	2.1 km	MPC · JPL
669933	2013 CT_{240}	—	February 8, 2013	Haleakala	Pan-STARRS 1	L4	5.7 km	MPC · JPL
669934	2013 CK_{241}	—	February 15, 2013	Haleakala	Pan-STARRS 1	·	2.1 km	MPC · JPL
669935	2013 CZ_{242}	—	February 13, 2013	Haleakala	Pan-STARRS 1	cubewano (hot)	268 km	MPC · JPL
669936	2013 CT_{245}	—	December 21, 2003	Kitt Peak	Spacewatch	·	1.5 km	MPC · JPL
669937	2013 CN_{246}	—	February 8, 2013	Haleakala	Pan-STARRS 1	L4	5.5 km	MPC · JPL
669938	2013 CQ_{249}	—	February 8, 2013	Kitt Peak	Spacewatch	L4	7.4 km	MPC · JPL
669939	2013 CY_{250}	—	February 14, 2013	Haleakala	Pan-STARRS 1	·	1.6 km	MPC · JPL
669940	2013 CK_{252}	—	February 8, 2013	Haleakala	Pan-STARRS 1	VER	2.0 km	MPC · JPL
669941	2013 CL_{252}	—	February 14, 2013	Haleakala	Pan-STARRS 1	EOS	1.6 km	MPC · JPL
669942	2013 CB_{253}	—	February 3, 2013	Haleakala	Pan-STARRS 1	·	2.4 km	MPC · JPL
669943	2013 CJ_{253}	—	February 15, 2013	Haleakala	Pan-STARRS 1	·	2.5 km	MPC · JPL
669944	2013 CG_{254}	—	February 8, 2013	Haleakala	Pan-STARRS 1	L4	5.9 km	MPC · JPL
669945	2013 CF_{258}	—	February 11, 2013	Nogales	M. Schwartz, P. R. Holvorcem	·	2.4 km	MPC · JPL
669946	2013 CX_{262}	—	February 5, 2013	Mount Lemmon	Mount Lemmon Survey	·	1.7 km	MPC · JPL
669947	2013 DX_{3}	—	October 24, 2011	Haleakala	Pan-STARRS 1	·	1.8 km	MPC · JPL
669948	2013 DW_{4}	—	February 16, 2013	Mount Lemmon	Mount Lemmon Survey	·	2.0 km	MPC · JPL
669949	2013 DF_{5}	—	November 7, 2008	Mount Lemmon	Mount Lemmon Survey	·	850 m	MPC · JPL
669950	2013 DS_{8}	—	February 17, 2013	Kitt Peak	Spacewatch	TIR	2.2 km	MPC · JPL
669951	2013 DH_{10}	—	February 9, 2013	Haleakala	Pan-STARRS 1	·	2.1 km	MPC · JPL
669952 Kootker	2013 DJ_{15}	Kootker	February 21, 2013	Piszkéstető	M. Langbroek, K. Sárneczky	H	440 m	MPC · JPL
669953	2013 DJ_{16}	—	January 10, 2013	Kitt Peak	Spacewatch	·	1.6 km	MPC · JPL
669954	2013 DH_{23}	—	February 17, 2013	Kitt Peak	Spacewatch	TIR	2.3 km	MPC · JPL
669955	2013 EE_{2}	—	January 19, 2013	Mount Lemmon	Mount Lemmon Survey	·	1.9 km	MPC · JPL
669956	2013 EX_{3}	—	February 8, 2002	Kitt Peak	Spacewatch	NYS	740 m	MPC · JPL
669957	2013 EE_{7}	—	January 9, 2013	Mount Lemmon	Mount Lemmon Survey	·	950 m	MPC · JPL
669958	2013 EO_{9}	—	February 17, 2013	Mount Lemmon	Mount Lemmon Survey	·	980 m	MPC · JPL
669959	2013 EV_{10}	—	February 17, 2013	Mount Lemmon	Mount Lemmon Survey	·	1.9 km	MPC · JPL
669960	2013 EW_{12}	—	March 23, 2006	Mount Lemmon	Mount Lemmon Survey	·	840 m	MPC · JPL
669961	2013 EX_{12}	—	July 24, 2007	Mauna Kea	D. D. Balam, K. M. Perrett	·	790 m	MPC · JPL
669962	2013 ET_{14}	—	February 5, 2013	Kitt Peak	Spacewatch	·	2.7 km	MPC · JPL
669963	2013 EF_{17}	—	February 8, 2013	Haleakala	Pan-STARRS 1	V	480 m	MPC · JPL
669964	2013 EH_{19}	—	March 5, 2013	Mount Lemmon	Mount Lemmon Survey	·	940 m	MPC · JPL
669965	2013 EN_{19}	—	March 26, 2008	Mount Lemmon	Mount Lemmon Survey	·	2.4 km	MPC · JPL
669966	2013 EB_{20}	—	February 5, 2002	Palomar	NEAT	·	1.8 km	MPC · JPL
669967	2013 EH_{20}	—	March 4, 2013	Haleakala	Pan-STARRS 1	H	490 m	MPC · JPL
669968	2013 ER_{21}	—	March 5, 2013	Mount Lemmon	Mount Lemmon Survey	·	930 m	MPC · JPL
669969	2013 EK_{23}	—	February 17, 2013	Kitt Peak	Spacewatch	H	480 m	MPC · JPL
669970	2013 EZ_{23}	—	August 5, 2010	La Sagra	OAM	PHO	870 m	MPC · JPL
669971	2013 EA_{24}	—	March 3, 2013	Nogales	M. Schwartz, P. R. Holvorcem	T_{j} (2.98)	2.7 km	MPC · JPL
669972	2013 EX_{25}	—	March 7, 2013	Mount Lemmon	Mount Lemmon Survey	·	1.1 km	MPC · JPL
669973	2013 EC_{27}	—	March 7, 2013	Mount Lemmon	Mount Lemmon Survey	·	720 m	MPC · JPL
669974	2013 EL_{30}	—	September 13, 2005	Kitt Peak	Spacewatch	EUP	3.0 km	MPC · JPL
669975	2013 ET_{31}	—	February 7, 2002	Palomar	NEAT	·	1.9 km	MPC · JPL
669976	2013 ET_{35}	—	November 25, 2012	Haleakala	Pan-STARRS 1	HNS	1.2 km	MPC · JPL
669977	2013 EY_{39}	—	March 10, 2013	Atacama	IAA-AI	LUT	3.5 km	MPC · JPL
669978	2013 EB_{41}	—	February 15, 2013	ESA OGS	ESA OGS	·	2.8 km	MPC · JPL
669979	2013 EE_{41}	—	February 8, 2002	Kitt Peak	Spacewatch	·	1.8 km	MPC · JPL
669980	2013 EN_{41}	—	August 28, 2006	Catalina	CSS	H	540 m	MPC · JPL
669981	2013 EG_{46}	—	August 29, 2006	Kitt Peak	Spacewatch	·	1.7 km	MPC · JPL
669982	2013 EQ_{47}	—	March 6, 2013	Haleakala	Pan-STARRS 1	·	2.3 km	MPC · JPL
669983	2013 EG_{48}	—	February 9, 2002	Kitt Peak	Spacewatch	MAS	620 m	MPC · JPL
669984	2013 ED_{50}	—	March 6, 2013	Haleakala	Pan-STARRS 1	·	2.6 km	MPC · JPL
669985	2013 EG_{51}	—	March 7, 2013	Kitt Peak	Spacewatch	·	2.1 km	MPC · JPL
669986	2013 EL_{52}	—	September 27, 2011	Mount Lemmon	Mount Lemmon Survey	·	2.5 km	MPC · JPL
669987	2013 EZ_{54}	—	March 8, 2013	Haleakala	Pan-STARRS 1	·	2.3 km	MPC · JPL
669988	2013 EU_{55}	—	February 18, 2013	Kitt Peak	Spacewatch	·	2.0 km	MPC · JPL
669989	2013 ED_{58}	—	February 19, 2013	Kitt Peak	Spacewatch	·	2.9 km	MPC · JPL
669990	2013 EP_{59}	—	November 24, 2011	Mount Lemmon	Mount Lemmon Survey	·	1.2 km	MPC · JPL
669991	2013 EV_{59}	—	March 8, 2013	Haleakala	Pan-STARRS 1	·	1.9 km	MPC · JPL
669992	2013 EX_{65}	—	March 10, 2013	Elena Remote	Oreshko, A.	·	1.8 km	MPC · JPL
669993	2013 EK_{67}	—	July 4, 2005	Mount Lemmon	Mount Lemmon Survey	·	2.1 km	MPC · JPL
669994	2013 EL_{68}	—	March 7, 2013	Kitt Peak	Spacewatch	EUN	1.0 km	MPC · JPL
669995	2013 EQ_{68}	—	March 7, 2013	Mount Lemmon	Mount Lemmon Survey	NYS	930 m	MPC · JPL
669996	2013 EU_{68}	—	August 5, 2005	Palomar	NEAT	KOR	1.5 km	MPC · JPL
669997	2013 EE_{69}	—	February 14, 2013	Haleakala	Pan-STARRS 1	·	2.5 km	MPC · JPL
669998	2013 EH_{69}	—	February 15, 2013	Haleakala	Pan-STARRS 1	·	2.8 km	MPC · JPL
669999	2013 EN_{72}	—	February 14, 2013	Haleakala	Pan-STARRS 1	VER	2.3 km	MPC · JPL
670000	2013 ET_{72}	—	February 16, 2013	Kitt Peak	Spacewatch	·	950 m	MPC · JPL

back to top

== Meaning of names ==
As minor planet discoveries are confirmed, they are given a permanent number by the IAU's Minor Planet Center (MPC), and the discoverers can then submit names for them, following the IAU's naming conventions. The list below concerns those minor planets in the specified number-range that have received names, and explains the meanings of those names.

Official naming citations of newly named small Solar System bodies are approved and published in a bulletin by IAU's Working Group for Small Bodies Nomenclature (WGSBN). Before May 2021, citations were published in MPC's Minor Planet Circulars for many decades. Recent citations can also be found on the JPL Small-Body Database (SBDB). Until his death in 2016, German astronomer Lutz D. Schmadel compiled these citations into the Dictionary of Minor Planet Names (DMP) and regularly updated the collection.

Based on Paul Herget's The Names of the Minor Planets, Schmadel also researched the unclear origin of numerous asteroids, most of which had been named prior to World War II. This article incorporates text from this source, which is in the public domain: SBDB New namings may only be added to this list below after official publication as the preannouncement of names is condemned. The WGSBN publishes a comprehensive guideline for the naming rules of non-cometary small Solar System bodies.

Named minor planet	Provisional	This minor planet was named for...	Ref · Catalog
669448 Pavelgabor	2012 WR_{41}	Pavel Gabor, Slovak Jesuit priest and astrophysicist.	IAU · 669448
669588 Pazura	2013 AS_{24}	Cezary Pazura (b. 1962), a Polish film, theater and dubbing actor, director, producer and cabaret artist.	IAU · 669588
669952 Kootker	2013 DJ_{15}	Lisette Kootker (born 1981), Dutch geo- and bioarchaeologist and forensic scientist.	IAU · 669952
