= (669555) 2012 YQ1 =

Asteroid

(669555) 2012 YQ_{1}
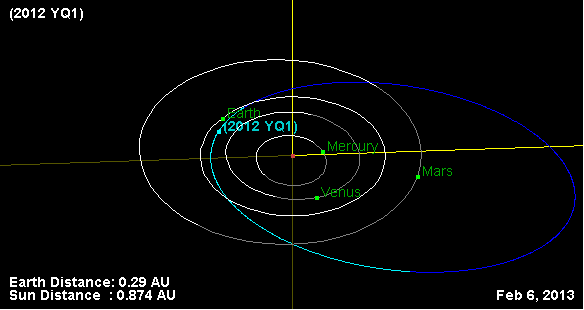
- Orbit (blue) of asteroid 2012 YQ_{1} for 6 February 2013

Discovery
- Discovered by: A. Oreshko; T. Kryachko
- Discovery site: Elena Remote Obs.
- Discovery date: 19 December 2012 (first observed only)

Designations
- Minor planet category: NEO · Apollo · PHA

Orbital characteristics
- Epoch 13 January 2016 (JD 2457400.5)
- Uncertainty parameter 6
- Aphelion: 3.11880 AU (466.566 Gm)
- Perihelion: 0.86916 AU (130.024 Gm)
- Semi-major axis: 1.99398 AU (298.295 Gm)
- Eccentricity: 0.56411
- Orbital period (sidereal): 2.82 yr (1028.4 d)
- Mean anomaly: 12.74578°
- Mean motion: 0° 21^{m} 0.158^{s} /day
- Inclination: 5.15193°
- Longitude of ascending node: 120.16813°
- Argument of perihelion: 42.09537°
- Earth MOID: 0.00774939 AU (1,159,292 km)

Physical characteristics
- Mean diameter: ~220 m (720 ft)
- Absolute magnitude (H): 21.1 · 20.9

(669555) 2012 YQ_{1} is a sub-kilometer asteroid, classified as a near-Earth object and a potentially hazardous asteroid of the Apollo group, approximately 200 meters in diameter. It was first observed on 19 December 2012, by astronomers Andrey Oreshko and Timur Kryachko at the Elena Remote Observatory (G32) located in the Chilean Atacama desert.

== Description ==
With a 4-day observation arc, the asteroid had a 1 in 3 million chance of impacting in 2106. With a 10-day observation arc, the asteroid had a 1 in 10 million chance of impacting in 2106. On 5 January 2013, the asteroid passed 0.10 AU (15,000,000 km; 9,300,000 mi) from Earth. It was removed from the Sentry Risk Table on 8 January 2013. It had an observation arc of 32 days and an orbital uncertainty of 7. Since the asteroid had a poorly known orbit, the cone of uncertainty quickly multiplied as a result of perturbations by the inner planets and prevented precise/reliable ephemeris data. Eliminating an entry on the Sentry Risk Table is a negative prediction; a prediction of where it will NOT be. With MPEC 2024-C131 the Minor Planet Center published a newly computed orbit on 12 February 2024, using observations till 12 November 2023 and prediscovery observations from 31 May till 5 June 2010, reducing the uncertainty to 1.

=== In the popular press ===
In 2013, an article, originally posted on The Voice of Russia had a poorly researched headline stating "We have 93 years left till the next End of the World". This story was reposted on Space Daily, but then astronomer Phil Plait clarified that it was "a fascinating mix of fact and error. A lot of what it says is accurate, but the most important claim—that an asteroid will impact Earth in 2106—is simply wrong."

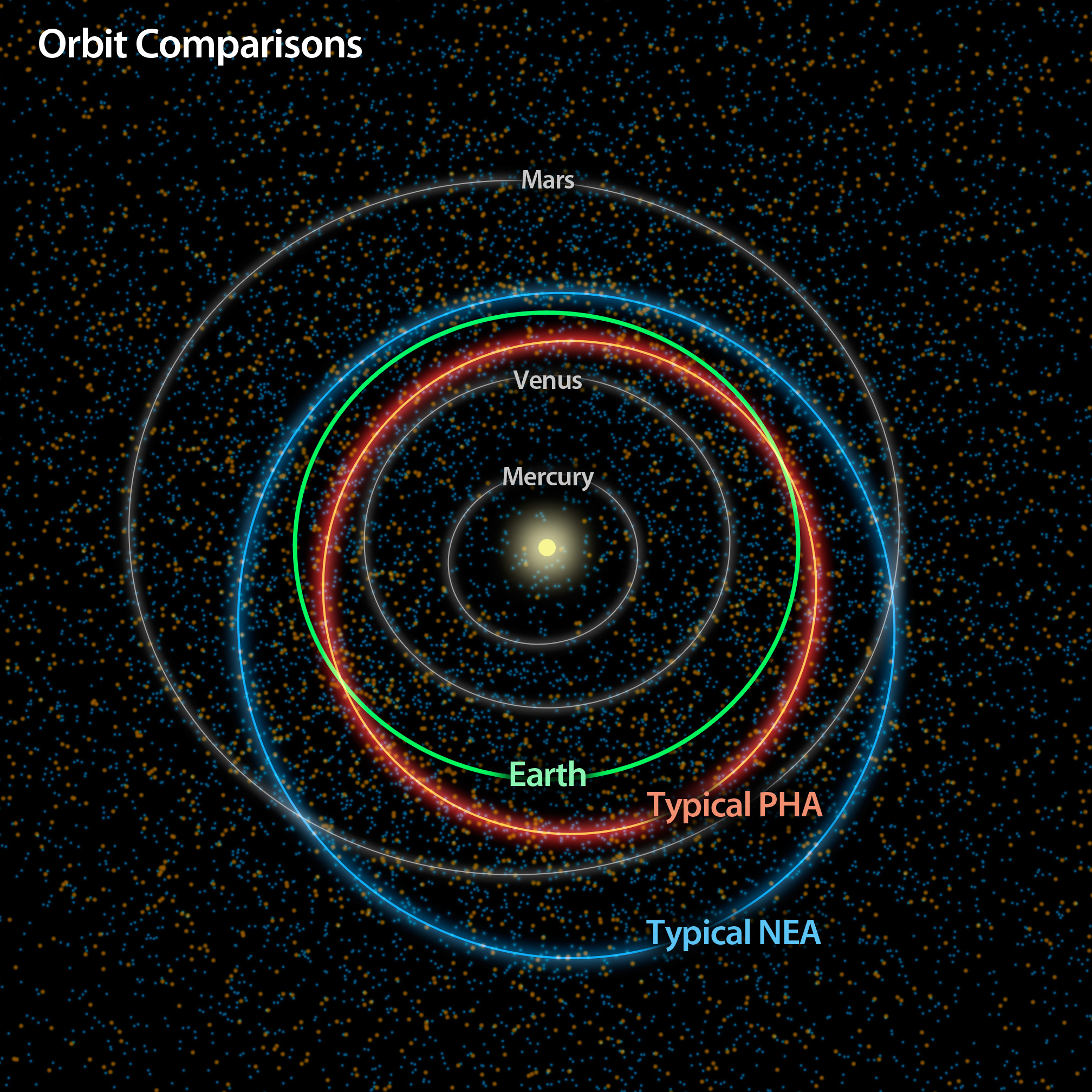
Orbits of a typical PHA (potentially hazardous asteroid) and NEA (Near-Earth Asteroid).

== See also ==
- Torino scale
- Palermo scale
