= WZHF =

- Capitol Heights, Maryland; United States
- Broadcast area: Washington metropolitan area
- Frequency: 1390 kHz

Programming
- Format: Regional Mexican

Ownership
- Owner: Multicultural Broadcasting; (Way Broadcasting Licensee, LLC)
- Operator: RM Broadcasting, LLC

History
- First air date: April 7, 1947
- Former call signs: WEAM (1947–1984); WMZQ (1984–1996)
- Call sign meaning: Z Health and Fitness

Technical information
- Licensing authority: FCC
- Facility ID: 73306
- Class: B
- Power: 9,000 watts (day); 1,000 watts (night)
- Transmitter coordinates: 38°52′9.4″N 76°53′45.9″W

Links
- Public license information: Public file; LMS

WZHF (1390 AM) is a radio station licensed to Capitol Heights, Maryland, United States, and serving the Washington, D.C. area. Owned by Multicultural Broadcasting and operated by RM Broadcasting, it features a regional Mexican format.

The station went on air on April 7, 1947, as WEAM, licensed to Arlington, Virginia, and founded by J. Maynard Magruder. Throughout its history, WZHF has had a variety of formats including top 40, rock, R&B, big band, country, and health. In the late 1970s and early 1980s, the station broadcast local college basketball games from American University, Georgetown, and George Washington. In 1984, WEAM was purchased by Viacom, became WMZQ, and changed to a classic country format. WMZQ was later a full simulcast of WMZQ-FM, its sister station that played contemporary country music, from 1987 to 1996. The WMZQ stations were among the most popular in the Washington area in the late 1980s and 1990s; they topped local ratings in 1988, 1992, and 1995. In 1996, WMZQ changed its call sign to the present WZHF and its format to health and fitness programming.

Beginning in 1999, WZHF had a variety of ethnic formats, with programming primarily in Spanish and various Asian languages. Multicultural Broadcasting bought WZHF in 2000. In 2011, WZHF began broadcasting English-language Voice of Russia programming. After resuming a Spanish-language format around 2015, WZHF began broadcasting Radio Sputnik, the successor of Voice of Russia, in November 2017. The station gained notoriety during this time due to Radio Sputnik's status as an official broadcaster of the Russian government; program broker RM Broadcasting was required to register with the U.S. government under the Foreign Agents Registration Act in 2019. Sanctions on the Russian government forced the winding-up of Radio Sputnik's U.S.-based operations in 2024.

== History ==
=== As WEAM (1947–1984) ===
Originally licensed to Arlington, Virginia, the station began broadcasting as WEAM, with a daytime-only, 1,000-watt signal, on April 7, 1947. WEAM's founder was J. Maynard Magruder, an Arlington entrepreneur and member of the Virginia House of Delegates. Pianist and bandleader Jack Little was an afternoon host for six months during the station's first year of operations. In January 1948, Magruder and other station investors sold WEAM to Harold and Meredith Thoms, who incorporated Thoms Broadcasting in 1966. By July 1948, WEAM upgraded its signal to 5,000 watts with unlimited broadcast hours.

WEAM was one of the most popular top-40 stations in the Washington area in the 1960s. In the late 1960s, WEAM's offices moved from its original Radio Building in Arlington to its transmitter location in nearby Falls Church.

In the mid-1970s, WEAM had progressive music and rock formats and was affiliated with the ABC Radio network. By 1977, WEAM changed its programming to target a black audience with R&B music and Georgetown University basketball games. By 1978, WEAM dropped Georgetown in favor of George Washington basketball play-by-play coverage.

WEAM briefly changed back to rock music before switching to big band in 1980. By 1981, WEAM began carrying American University basketball games. Thoms Broadcasting laid off DJs Al Ross and Bob Bassett in February 1984 in favor of syndicated programming from the Satellite Music Network.

=== As WMZQ (1984–1996) ===
In March 1984, Viacom bought WEAM. Viacom changed the station's call sign to WMZQ, after its country station WMZQ-FM; initially, the AM station played classic country, in contrast to its sister FM station that played newer music. Owing to a new Federal Communications Commission (FCC) rule that allowed stations to simulcast more than 50 percent of content on both AM and FM, Viacom converted WMZQ into a complete simulcast of WMZQ-FM in July 1987.

Washingtonian magazine named the WMZQ family of stations the "Best Country Station" in 1985 for the fifth straight year. By the spring of 1988, Arbitron ranked WMZQ's morning show hosted by Jim London and Mary Ball as the no. 1 morning show in Washington, and listeners included Vice President George H. W. Bush and Second Lady Barbara Bush. That year, WMZQ had also become the no. 1 rated station in Washington overall. WMZQ again ranked no. 1 on Arbitron ratings in spring 1992 and spring 1995.

=== As WZHF (1996–present) ===
On August 9, 1996, WZHF began broadcasting with its current call sign, after dropping its simulcast of country station WMZQ-FM in favor of a new health and fitness format on July 29. Its branding was "Washington's Health and Fitness Radio". Ellen Ratner hosted the Morning Health Show weekdays at 7 a.m.

After purchasing WZHF and other Viacom radio stations in the spring of 1997, Chancellor Broadcasting sold WZHF to Palo Alto, California-based Douglas Broadcasting for $7.5 million later in the year. By August 29 that year, the call sign changed to WVPA but reverted to WZHF by November 7. Douglas Broadcasting changed WZHF's format to carry Asian ethnic programming produced in California. WZHF added what Marc Fisher of The Washington Post described as the "first radio voice" for the Washington-area LGBT community in 1998, a nightly hour Rainbow Radio with a rotating set of programs about health, relationships, and finance.

In 1999, Mega Communications Inc. purchased WZHF from PAR Holdings for $11 million and added the station to its Spanish-language Mega Broadcasting network.

Nearly a year later in April 2000, Multicultural Broadcasting (doing business as Way Broadcasting) bought WZHF and WKDV in Manassas, Virginia, from Mega in exchange for $24.5 million and New York City station WKDM. WZHF began relaying Chinese-language programming from New York City on July 7, 2000, while Multicultural Broadcasting sought to sell air time. By 2001, WZHF added Spanish- and Vietnamese-language programming. Former WARW morning host Doug Tracht made a brief comeback with a 6 a.m. show in March 2001, nearly two years after being fired from WARW for controversial, racist comments.

WZHF began carrying English-language, US-produced Voice of Russia programming in March 2011.

In June 2014, WZHF began broadcasting with a construction permit from a tower used by WJFK and WUST in Walker Mill, Maryland. Nearly half a year earlier in December 2013, station owner Way Broadcasting applied to change the community of license to Capitol Heights, Maryland. The reason behind the change was the station's tower location in Falls Church, Virginia, was not renewed after more than two decades.

On April 22, 2016, the FCC granted a new class B license to WZHF through October 1, 2019, that modified its city of license to Capitol Heights, Maryland and changed its transmitter power to 9,000 watts in daytime and 1,000 watts at night.

From around August 2015 to November 2017, WZHF had a regional Mexican music format branded "Fiesta 1390".

==== Radio Sputnik and FARA registration ====
On November 25, 2017, WZHF began broadcasting Radio Sputnik, the Russian government's international, English-language broadcast network. Radio Sputnik had gained an initial foothold in Washington in June 2017 by leasing FM translator W288BS (105.5 FM), after its previous lessee Bluegrass Country could no longer afford it. With the corresponding lease of WZHF, it was reassigned as W288BS's originating station.

WZHF fully simulcast Radio Sputnik, aside from also carrying WZHF's own hourly station identification. This deal took the form of a local marketing agreement (LMA) with RM Broadcasting of Jupiter, Florida, a program broker. RM Broadcasting paid Multicultural Broadcasting $35,000 per month to control WZHF's airtime, and in turn resold the airtime to Rossiya Segodnya, operator of Radio Sputnik and a media group controlled by the Russian government. Rossiya Segodnya paid roughly $55,000 per month to RM Broadcasting, with occasional larger advance payments. The LMA currently in effect with RM Broadcasting began on December 1, 2023, and expires after one year.

In October 2018, RM Broadcasting, LLC sued the United States Department of Justice (DOJ) over the requirement it should register as a Russian agent under the Foreign Agents Registration Act (FARA). In May 2019, federal judge Robin L. Rosenberg ruled that the station must register as an agent of the Russian government. Payments made to RM Broadcasting by Rossiya Segodnya made it an agent of the Russian broadcasting organization, according to the ruling. The Justice Department, in a statement, said American citizens "have a right to know if a foreign flag waves behind speech broadcast in the United States."

RM Broadcasting, LLC registered as a foreign agent with the DOJ on June 21, 2019. In DOJ filings, the Florida-based company acknowledged that they were paid $1,427,016.29, from November 24, 2017, to June 2019, by the "Federal State Unitary Enterprise International Information Agency".

September 2024 saw the U.S. government levy a new round of sanctions on Russia over programming broadcast on RT, as well as pressure on the FCC from members of Congress to revoke WZHF's license. Though Radio Sputnik was not directly named in the sanctions, they impacted Rossiya Segodna and made it difficult to continue leasing time on WZHF and KCXL. Radio Sputnik shuttered its Washington-based offices and ended all U.S.-produced programming on October 15. It continued broadcasting its international English feed until its leases of WZHF and W288BS ended at 11:59 p.m. on October 31, 2024.

WZHF returned to an automated feed of regional Mexican music after the lease ended, while W288BS began rebroadcasting WFED (1500 AM).
