= Christmas Eve in Washington =

Christmas song

"Christmas Eve in Washington" is a melodic Christmas song by American singer Maura Sullivan originally performed in 1982 for the radio station WMZQ-FM. It was written in twenty minutes by Sullivan and radio show host Jim London. Sullivan premiered the song on the radio and sold one thousand copies in cassette form within a few hours. The single generated $180,000 for charities at the Children's National Hospital and Susan G. Komen for the Cure. The current version was recorded in 1987. WBIG-FM included the single on their holiday album in the 1990s. The lyrics consist of paeans to freedom and family. It mentions many Washington metropolitan area specific sites including the Blue Ridge Mountains, Chesapeake Bay, Georgetown, Tidal Basin, and the United States Capitol dome. The song has been compared to the folk song "Christmas in Washington" by Steve Earle. In a 2012 interview, Sullivan stated she would not add any additional lyrics to the song.
