= Maura Sullivan (singer) =

American singer-songwriter

- Born: 1955 (age 69–70)
- Origin: Virginia, US
- Genres: Country blues
- Occupation(s): Singer-songwriter, real estate agent, children's writer
- Instrument: Vocals
- Website: allinformaura.com

Maura Ann Sullivan (born 1955) is an American real estate agent, children's writer, and former singer-songwriter most known for her 1982 single, "Christmas Eve in Washington." The song generated $180,000 (equivalent to $586,490 in 2024) for charities at the Children's National Hospital and Susan G. Komen for the Cure. In 1984, she released Out of the Blue, a country blues album through Success Records.

== Early life and education ==
Born in Brooklyn, New York, Sullivan grew up in Iceland and the Philippines due to her father's job in the United States Navy. Her family later settled in Maryland, where she attended St. Mary's Academy in Leonardtown and St. Mary's College of Maryland.

== Career ==
During the early 1980s, Sullivan was a reoccurring guest on WMZQ-FM where she would create comedic songs using 10 ideas from call in listeners. This led to her writing the single "Christmas Eve in Washington" (1982) alongside radio show host Jim London. Sullivan premiered the song on the radio and sold one thousand copies in cassette form within a few hours. The single generated $180,000 (equivalent to $586,490 in 2024) for charities at the Children's National Hospital and Susan G. Komen for the Cure. The current version was recorded in 1987. WBIG-FM included the single on their holiday album in the 1990s.

Sullivan's debut album, Out of the Blue, was released in 1984 through Success Records. It features country blues ballads. Musician Lloyd Green is featured on the steel guitar. The album included original tracks and covers of "Wrong End of the Rainbow" and "Too Good to Stop Now." Jim Williamson and Tony Migliore were producers. People drew comparisons of Sullivan's "intense voice to Édith Piaf. Sullivan was an opening act for Joan Rivers, George Strait, Janie Fricke, Arlo Guthrie, Richie Havens, Odetta, Looking Glass, George Jones, Lee Greenwood, Loretta Lynn, and John Denver.

Sullivan revealed that she was burned out and left the music industry. She worked as a real estate agent in Woodbridge, Virginia. Sullivan authored the children's book, Marty the Dolphin's Gread Day Adventure with Jay Schwartz as the illustrator-cartoonist.

== Personal life ==
Sullivan was diagnosed with stage 4 colorectal cancer in December 2017 and sought treatment at Inova Health System. After a brief remission, the cancer came back in March 2019.
