= RM Broadcasting =

American radio company

RM Broadcasting, LLC
- Industry: Radio broadcasting
- Founded: January 12, 2010; 16 years ago
- Founder: Arnold P. Ferolito
- Headquarters: Jupiter, Florida, United States

RM Broadcasting is a United States radio company based in Jupiter, Florida owned and operated by Arnold Ferolito. The company engages in time brokerage agreements, and is primarily known for platforming Russian government programming Radio Sputnik and a legal battle over initially refusing to register as a foreign agent.

The company has received press over selling time to Rossiya Segodnya and playing a part in disseminating pro-Russian propaganda in the United States. Ferolito frequently defended his comportment on the grounds of allowing free speech, and repeated that justification after facing increased scrutiny from the National Association of Broadcasters following the 2022 Russian invasion of Ukraine.

RM Broadcasting has arranged time brokerage agreements with Alpine Broadcasting and several stations, including KJJZ (formerly KAJR and KLCX), WZHF, KRHQ, and KCXL.
