= Marats Kasems =

Latvian journalist

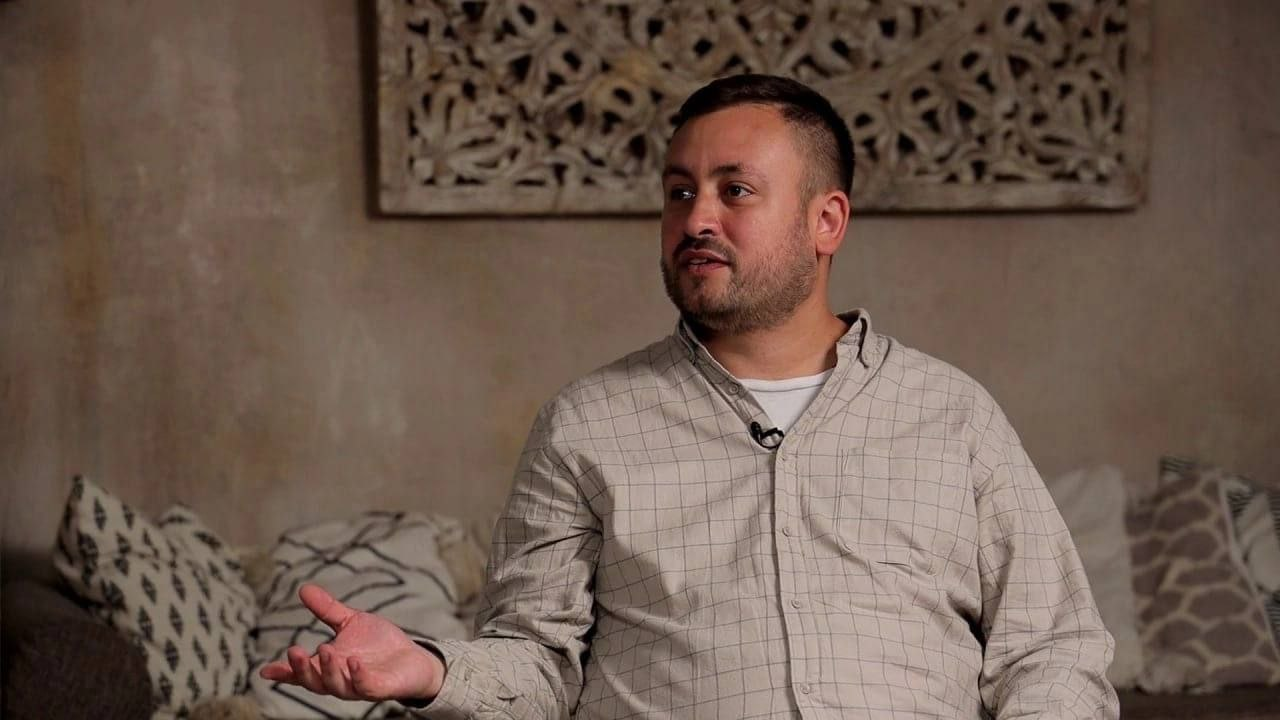
- Born: March 14, 1990 (age 36); Riga, Latvian SSR, Soviet Union
- Education: Peoples' Friendship University of Russia
- Occupation: Journalist
- Known for: Editor-in-chief of Sputnik Lithuania

Marats Kasems (born 14 March 1990, Riga) is a Latvian journalist and former editor-in-chief of Sputnik Lithuania, a media outlet operated by the Russian state agency Rossiya Segodnya. He became known for his involvement in Russian media, political activity in Latvia, and legal proceedings related to national security charges.

== Early life and education ==
Kasems was born to a Yemeni father and a Russian speaking mother. His father, Fadel Kasem, served in the military. He studied piano at the Salaspils Music School and later enrolled in political science at the University of Latvia, though he did not complete his degree. He later received a master's degree from the Peoples' Friendship University of Russia.

== Political activity ==
In 2013, Kasems ran for a seat on the Salaspils municipal council as a candidate from the Harmony party. He was expelled from the party after a video surfaced in which he used profane language in response to the election outcome.

In 2018, he participated in the parliamentary elections as a candidate from the political alliance "For an Alternative" (Par Alternatīvu), identifying himself as a journalist for Rossiya Segodnya.

== Work in Russian media ==
Kasem became editor-in-chief of Sputnik Lithuania. In 2019, Lithuanian authorities declared him persona non grata and banned him from entering the country for five years, citing national security concerns.

== Arrest and trial in Latvia ==
On 30 December 2022, Kasem was detained by the Latvian Security Service upon his arrival in Latvia. He was charged with assisting a foreign state in activities directed against the Republic of Latvia under Article 84 of the Latvian Criminal Code. He was suspected of violating European Union sanctions and espionage-related offenses.

In April 2023, he was released from pre-trial detention under a travel ban. In July 2023, he was found guilty and fined €15,500 after confessing and expressing remorse.

== Later interviews ==
In August 2023, Kasem gave an interview to the news outlet Delfi, where he described working for Russian media executive Dmitry Kiselyov as "dirty work" for little pay. He also stated that he had no intention of returning to Russia. The interview was later removed from the Delfi website. In another interview with TV3 Latvia, he expressed interest in running again for the Saeima.

== Views ==
Kasem has argued that Latvia, as a small state, must use all means available to protect its information space. He has called for inclusiveness in Latvian national identity, suggesting that all long-term residents should be considered Latvians and patriots. He also noted that the popularity of banned television channels indicates unresolved societal divides and vulnerabilities.

== See also ==
- Sputnik (news agency)
- Mass media in Latvia§Censorship and media freedom
- State propaganda in the Russian Federation
