= WASH (FM) =

- Washington, D.C.; United States
- Broadcast area: Washington metropolitan area
- Frequency: 97.1 MHz (HD Radio)
- RDS: PI: 1683; PTY: Adult Hits; RT: 97.1WASH Title Artist
- Branding: 97.1 WASH-FM

Programming
- Language: English
- Format: Adult contemporary
- Subchannels: HD2: Air1 (contemporary worship music)
- Affiliations: iHeartRadio; Premiere Networks

Ownership
- Owner: iHeartMedia; (iHM Licenses LLC)
- Sister stations: WBIG-FM; WIHT; WMZQ-FM; WUST; WWDC

History
- First air date: September 1945 (as W3XL); December 17, 1946 (as WASH)
- Former call signs: WSDC (1946, Construction permit); KG2XIG (1958, part-time)
- Former frequencies: 98.9 MHz (1946–1947)
- Call sign meaning: Washington, D.C.

Technical information
- Licensing authority: FCC
- Facility ID: 70933
- Class: B
- ERP: 17,500 watts
- HAAT: 242 meters (794 ft)
- Transmitter coordinates: 38°57′1.40″N 77°4′45.9″W

Links
- Public license information: Public file; LMS
- Webcast: Listen live (via iHeartRadio)
- Website: washfm.iheart.com

WASH (97.1 MHz) is a commercial radio station owned and operated by iHeartMedia and located in Washington, D.C. Known on-air as "WASH-FM", the station airs an adult contemporary radio format. Studios and offices are on Rockville Pike (Maryland Route 355) in Rockville, Maryland. The station has an effective radiated power (ERP) of 17,500 watts, broadcasting from a tower at 242 metres (794 ft) in height above average terrain (HAAT). The transmitter site is on Chesapeake Street NW off Wisconsin Avenue in the Tenleytown neighborhood of Washington, D.C. With a good radio, WASH coverage extends from Baltimore to Fredericksburg, Virginia.

WASH broadcasts using HD Radio technology. Its HD2 digital subchannel carries the Air1 contemporary Christian music channel from the Educational Media Foundation, and its HD3 subchannel formerly carried iHeartRadio's "The Breeze" soft AC format. WASH streams its programming on the iHeartRadio platform.

Weekdays begin with the Toby & Chilli morning show, followed by Jenni Chase in middays and Sabrina Conte in afternoons. In the evening, WASH carries the syndicated Delilah show, featuring music requests and call-ins. Weekends include the syndicated Ellen K Show and Back Trax USA with Kid Kelly. For much of November and December, the station switches to Christmas music (as well as on July 25 for "Christmas in July") and calls itself "Washington's Home For The Holidays" during the holiday season.

== History ==
=== Early years ===
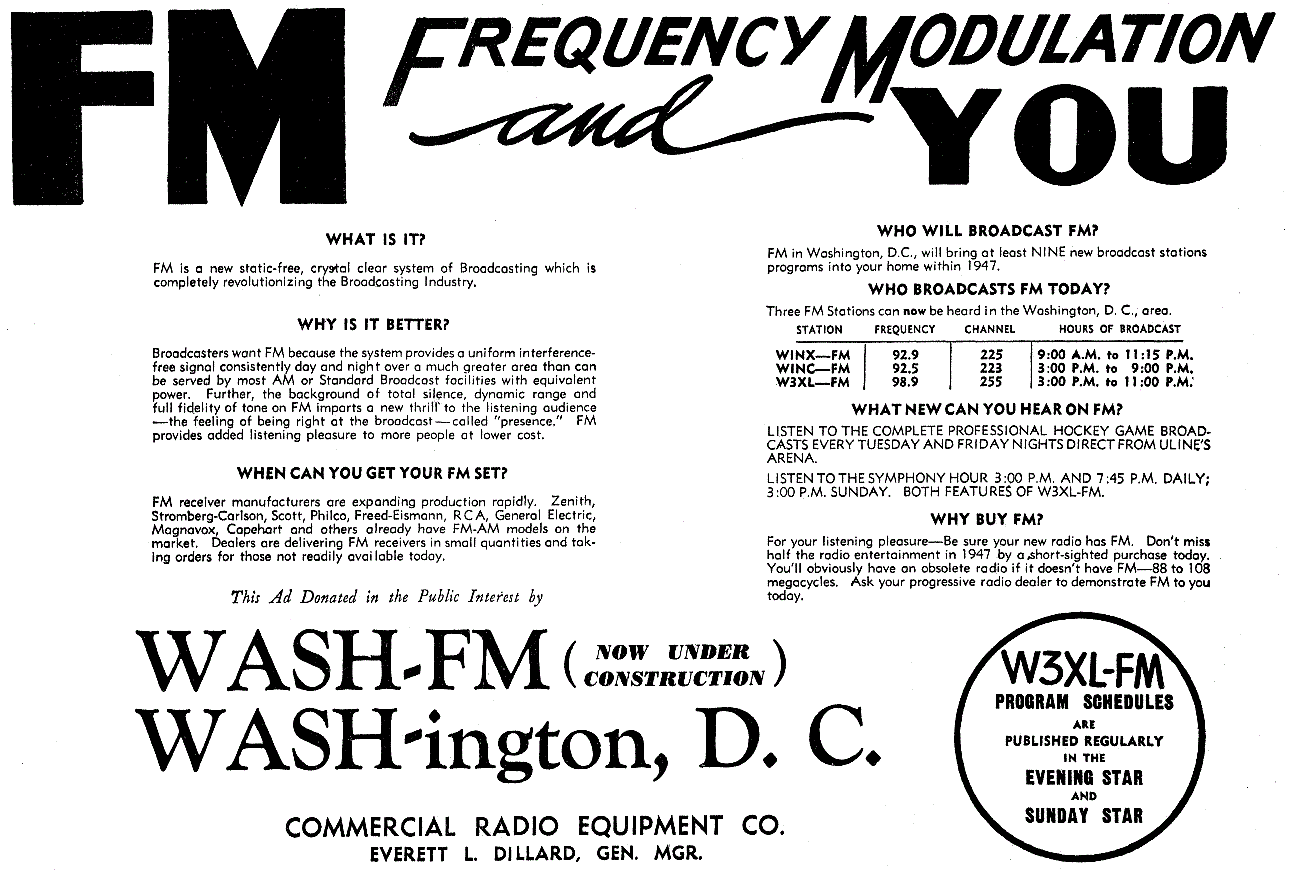
In December 1946, experimental FM station W3XL was converted into commercial broadcasting station WASH.

WASH evolved from an experimental FM station, W3XL, which was first licensed in September 1945. The station was operated by the Commercial Radio Equipment Company, which had been founded in 1933 by Everett L. Dillard in Kansas City, Kansas, and later moved to Washington.

In May 1940, the Federal Communications Commission (FCC) had announced the establishment, effective January 1, 1941, of an FM band operating on 40 channels spanning 42–50 MHz. In 1945 the FCC began the process of reassigning the original FM band frequencies to other services, and ordered existing stations to move to a new band from 88 to 106 MHz, which was later expanded to 88–108 MHz. W3XL, transmitting on 98.9 MHz, was one of the first stations to broadcast on a "high band" frequency. By November 1946 the station was operating on a regular schedule of 3 to 11 p.m.

As of 1945 there were no commercial FM stations in the Washington area, with the only local FM broadcasters consisting of two experimental authorizations: W3XL, plus the WINX Broadcasting Company's W3XO, which had begun operations in 1939. In October 1945, Everett Dillard filed an application to convert W3XL into a commercial station. A construction permit was granted the following September, and initially assigned the call letters WSDC, which were changed to WASH two months later, prior to the station beginning operations. WASH debuted as Washington's second commercial FM station at 6:30 p.m. on December 17, 1946. (W3XO had already been converted into Washington's first commercial station, originally as WINX-FM, and started regular broadcasts in September 1946.) In the early era of FM broadcasting, most stations were co-owned with an AM station and often simulcast its programming, when few listeners had FM receivers. WASH was a rare stand-alone FM outlet. Everett Dillard served as the president and general manager, and studios were located at 1319 F Street NW.

WASH's assignment was for operation on 101.3 MHz. However, it received a special temporary authority to broadcast on 98.9 MHz with reduced power, employing W3XL's transmitter in Northwest Washington. WASH was reassigned to its current frequency, 97.1 MHz, in mid-1947 without ever broadcasting on 101.3. From September 16, 1947, through May 3, 1950, the station relayed BBC Overseas Service programming and thrice-daily time signals from WWV via shortwave while it constructed a studio.

From September 18, 1958, through March 31, 1959, it was granted unusual permission to operate as a non-commercial station, identified by the experimental call sign KG2XIG instead of its normal call sign.

=== Metromedia ownership ===
In 1968, Metromedia acquired the station, making WASH a sister station to television station WTTG. Metromedia also owned successful radio stations across the U.S., including WNEW and WNEW-FM in New York City, WIP and WMMR in Philadelphia and KLAC and KMET in Los Angeles.

WASH has been an adult contemporary station in one form or another since the 1970s. Under Metromedia ownership, it was considered a personality-oriented middle of the road (MOR) station, similar to WNEW. This was a format almost always found on AM radio, where people could hear it on kitchen radios and in the car; however, Metromedia did not own an AM station in Washington, so WASH took on the format. Disc jockeys played the adult hits of the day, from Frank Sinatra and Barbra Streisand to The Carpenters and Dionne Warwick, chatting between the songs and airing hourly news updates.

For a few years in the early 1980s, the station attempted to do a Top 40/CHR format, publicized by the station's "WASH with the Stars" TV advertising campaign. Due to having little success against Washington's established Top 40 stations in WPGC-FM and WRQX, WASH returned to a full service adult contemporary format.

=== Outlet, AMFM and Clear Channel/iHeartMedia ownership ===
In 1986, WASH was sold to The Outlet Company, a Providence, Rhode Island–based broadcasting and retail firm which already owned WTOP (1500 AM). Under Outlet ownership, WASH became a more conventional AC station.

In 1997, WASH changed hands again, this time acquired by AMFM, Inc. In 1999, AMFM merged into Clear Channel Communications, which today is known as iHeartMedia.

Until late 2013, the station played disco music and related dance and pop songs (mostly 1970s hits) in a program known as "Jammin' Saturday Night" from 7 p.m. to midnight. After the 2013 holiday season, the program was revamped to play songs from the 1980s under the name "All 80's Saturday Night". In July 2017, that program was replaced by "Lovin' Life, Living the 80's", a similar show hosted by Tom Kent.
