= WWDC (FM) =

Alternative rock radio station in Washington, D.C.

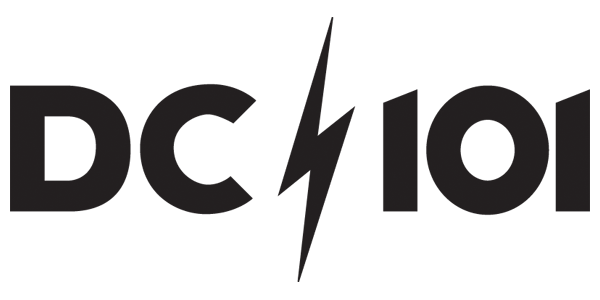
- Washington, D.C.; United States
- Broadcast area: Washington–Baltimore metropolitan area
- Frequency: 101.1 MHz (HD Radio)
- Branding: DC101

Programming
- Language: English
- Format: Alternative rock
- Subchannels: HD2: iHeart Sports DC (sports radio)
- Affiliations: Compass Media Networks; iHeartRadio; Premiere Networks

Ownership
- Owner: iHeartMedia; (iHM Licenses, LLC)
- Sister stations: WASH; WBIG-FM; WIHT; WMZQ-FM; WUST

History
- First air date: February 17, 1949
- Former call signs: WOL-FM (1945–1950); WWDC-FM (1950–2005)
- Former frequencies: 97.5 MHz (1945–1946) (CP); 94.5 MHz (1946) (CP); 100.5 MHz (1946–1947) (CP); 98.7 MHz (1947–1950)
- Call sign meaning: Washington, D.C.

Technical information
- Licensing authority: FCC
- Facility ID: 8682
- Class: B
- ERP: 22,500 watts (analog); 357 watts (digital)
- HAAT: 232 meters (761 ft)
- Transmitter coordinates: 38°59′59.4″N 77°3′25.9″W

Links
- Public license information: Public file; LMS
- Webcast: Listen live (via iHeartRadio); HD2: Listen live (via iHeartRadio)
- Website: dc101.iheart.com; HD2: iheartsportsdc.iheart.com

WWDC (101.1 MHz) is a commercial radio station in Rockville, Maryland, near Washington, D.C. The station is owned by iHeartMedia through licensee iHM Licenses, LLC, and broadcasts an alternative rock radio format. WWDC serves as the flagship station for the syndicated radio show Elliot in the Morning and as the local affiliate for Skratch 'N Sniff.

The transmitter is on Brookville Road in Silver Spring, Maryland, at (39°0′0″N 77°3′25″W). WWDC broadcasts using HD Radio technology and simulcasts the sports radio and sports betting programming of WTSD "1190 iHeart Sports DC" on its HD2 digital subchannel.

== History ==
=== WOL-FM ===
On October 5, 1945, Cowles Broadcasting Company applied to the Federal Communications Commission (FCC) for a construction permit for a new FM station on 97.5 MHz. The FCC granted the permit on June 9, 1946. The permit was modified several times, with the station's frequency changing to 94.5 MHz, then 100.5 MHz, and finally 98.7 MHz. The station was originally given the call sign WOL-FM, as the FM counterpart to WOL (1260 AM). The FCC granted the station its first license on February 17, 1949.

Cowles Broadcasting sold WOL-AM-FM to the Capital Broadcasting Company on October 3, 1949. At the time, Capital Broadcasting owned WWDC (1450 AM) and WWDC-FM 101.1. The FCC approved the sale on the condition that WWDC's 250-watt signal on 1450 AM would not be upgraded.

=== WWDC-FM ===
Capital Broadcasting decided to swap the licenses, call signs and facilities of the two AM stations and the two FM stations. WOL-FM's call sign would be changed to WWDC-FM while its frequency would be changed to 101.1 MHz. Simultaneously, WWDC-FM's call sign would be changed to WOL-FM while its frequency would be changed to 98.7 MHz. To prepare for these changes, Capital Broadcasting applied to the FCC for a construction permit on January 26, 1950, to change WOL-FM's frequency to 101.1 MHz. The call signs were swapped on the effective date of the sale, February 20, 1950. The FCC granted Capital Broadcasting a new license for the station, with the new call sign, for operation on the new frequency on August 26, 1952.

Also on February 20, 1950, the call sign swap for the AM stations took place, with the WWDC call sign now on the more powerful 5-kilowatt 1260 AM facility. Capital Broadcasting then sold WOL to Peoples Broadcasting. Unlike the AM stations, the FM stations were near each other and on equal footing at 20 kilowatts of power.

=== Rock DC 101 ===
In the late 1960s and early 1970s, WWDC-FM simulcast the programming of its middle of the road (MOR) AM sister station on weekdays, and played oldies at night and on weekends. Early on, pop-oriented acts including Elton John, Billy Joel, Fleetwood Mac, Hall & Oates and Rod Stewart were core artists.

In the mid-1970s, it played progressive rock at night for a few months, and then switched full-time to an album rock music format. Its AM counterpart, WWDC, was one of the first American radio stations to play the Beatles' song "I Want to Hold Your Hand" when it aired in December 1963; this led to the song's planned American release being pushed up by a few weeks, launching Beatlemania in the United States.

WWDC-FM enjoyed success with the rock format in the 1980s. The station was #1 in men (Arbitron) and was quite profitable. One of the premier album rock stations in the country, the disc jockey staff featured Greaseman in the morning, Dusty Scott in midday, Steveski in afternoons and Kirk McEwen in the evening. With this lineup and format, WWDC-FM consistently ran in the 6s, dominating men in the nation's 7th largest market. The format was a combination of current rock releases along with rock tracks from the 1960s and 1970s. Other DJs ("Boss Jocks") during the 1980s included Adam "Smash" Smasher, Ernie Kyger (Ernie D'Kaye), Cerphe, Sandy Edwards, Buddy Rizer, Rich Levinson, Tim Shamble, YDB (Young Dave Brown), Sean Donohue (Rusty Brainpan), and Vinnie Brewster.

=== Alternative rock ===
In the 90s and early aughts, WWDC's playlist was typically current hard rock, playing acts like Foo Fighters and Metallica. During the 1990s, the station began adding more modern and alternative rock acts including Smashing Pumpkins and Stone Temple Pilots to compete with its chief rival, WHFS. WWDC changed to its current alternative rock format by 2005 after WHFS-FM's genre change to tropical music as WLZL.

In 2007, the station was nominated by Radio & Records for top alternative station in a top-25 market.

=== Ownership changes ===
WWDC was among the last independently owned radio stations in the Washington market. In February 1998, parent company Capitol Broadcasting sold WWDC-FM and its AM sister station, WWDC, for $72 million to Texas-based Chancellor Media, which later was renamed AMFM. AMFM was acquired by Clear Channel Communications, which now, as iHeartMedia, owns and operates six radio stations in Washington, D.C.

WWDC's facilities were once located on Connecticut Avenue between Dupont Circle and Farragut Square in downtown Washington, D.C. The studios later moved to Silver Spring, Maryland, and are now located at 1801 Rockville Pike in Rockville, Maryland. By 2011, WWDC added Aerosmith, Led Zeppelin, Black Sabbath, Jimi Hendrix and Pink Floyd back on the playlist, although they were played sparingly and the station was still not considered active rock. Within a few years, those artists were dropped from the playlist.

=== Shock jocks ===
WWDC advanced the careers of several famous morning radio personalities, sometimes referred to as "shock jocks". Howard Stern was the morning drive time host from March 1981 to June 1982. When Stern left the station on June 29, 1982, it was rumored that he was fired because of his on-air prank of pretending to call Air Florida airlines to book a flight to the 14th Street Bridge. That was one day after 78 people died, when Air Florida Flight 90 crashed into the Potomac River at the bridge. But nearly six months elapsed between the crash of Air Florida 90 which occurred on January 13, 1982, and Stern's firing in late June. It is more likely that Stern was released because he had already signed a contract with WNBC in New York City before his WWDC-FM contract ended. It is at WWDC-FM that Stern was first paired with news anchor Robin Quivers. WWDC-FM is featured prominently in Stern's 1997 bio-pic Private Parts.

Stern was replaced by Doug Tracht, better known as the Greaseman, who spent over ten years at the station, from August 2, 1982, to January 22, 1993, and returned to the station in April 2008. Tracht was let go again in October 2008 so the station could focus solely on music on weekends without his comedy bits.

WWDC's current morning program is Elliot In the Morning, led by Elliot Segal. Since beginning his tenure at WWDC in 1999, Segal has been suspended and fined on several occasions for the show's sometimes controversial content; in October 2003, Clear Channel was fined $55,000 for the broadcast of reportedly indecent material during two episodes of the program in May 2002. In the first of the two broadcasts on May 7, 2002, a pair of sixteen-year-old students of Bishop Denis J. O'Connell High School had phoned the show to participate in a contest, whose winners would receive a chance to become cage dancers at an upcoming Kid Rock concert. The two students—who assumed false names and claimed to be 18—discussed allegations of sexual activity at the school, goaded on by host Segal, including "graphic and explicit references to the sexual activities of the school's students and administrators" (such as oral sex). The next day, after learning that the two students had been suspended for the remarks, Segal criticized the school and its staff on-air, and proceeded to take further calls from O'Connell students that contained similar content.

== HD radio and former translator ==
=== 104.7 Rock Nation and 104.7 Wonk FM ===
WWDC-HD2 originally aired an active rock format known as "104.7 Rock Nation". The programming was simulcast on FM translator W284CQ at 104.7 FM. The translator was originally located in Chevy Chase, Maryland, and later moved to Arlington, Virginia.

WWDC-HD2 logo as "104.7 Wonk FM"

From January 9, 2019 to January 5, 2023, WWDC-FM's HD2 digital subchannel carried a talk radio format known as "104.7 Wonk FM". It aired popular iHeartRadio podcasts including HowStuffWorks along with the Reaction Zone, an afternoon show carrying highlights of shows from other iHeartMedia talk stations. Wonk-FM also aired Sacramento-based Armstrong & Getty as well as some local traffic and weather reports. In early 2022, WWDC-HD2/W284CQ dropped podcasts as part of iHeart's nationwide phaseout of the over-the-air format. It added two progressive talk shows, Stephanie Miller and Thom Hartmann, on weekdays. Also heard were Joe Pags, Michael Medved and "Coast to Coast AM with George Noory". On weekends, the subchannel and translator carried the co-owned Black Information Network (BIN), which also airs on sister station WUST (1120 AM).

==== Sports ====
WWDC-HD2 and W284CQ temporarily became the FM home of the Washington Capitals from January 23, 2017, through the end of the 2016–17 season. The midseason deal came about after sports radio station WJFK-FM elected not to renew its deal with the Capitals before the 2016–17 season, limiting the team's local broadcasts to WFED and Internet streaming. The Washington Wizards share WFED as their home station and take precedence in conflicts; as a result, Capitals games were left without a home radio broadcast when both teams were playing, leading to complaints from fans and the media. WWDC-HD2 and W284CQ aired all Capitals games for the remainder of the 2016–17 season. At the time the deal was struck, the active rock format was also inaugurated. WWDC-HD2 ceased broadcasting the Capitals at the beginning of the 2017–18 season, as games returned to WJFK-FM.

The two stations also added Baltimore Ravens coverage for the 2017 season, replacing WBIG-FM as the team's Washington outlet. Ravens coverage later moved to WSBN.

=== iHeart Sports DC ===
On January 5, 2023, WWDC-HD2 and W284CQ changed their format to a simulcast of WTSD (1190 AM) in Leesburg, Virginia. The stations were known as "iHeart Sports DC".

The schedule features programming from Fox Sports Radio on weekdays, switching to sports betting shows at night. The Fox Sports programs include The Dan Patrick Show, The Herd with Colin Cowherd and The Doug Gottlieb Show. In the evening, programs from Vegas Stats & Information Network or VSiN are heard.

On July 10, 2023, W284CQ changed its programming source to the HD2 channel of co-owned WMZQ-FM, which launched a conservative talk format branded as "Freedom 104.7". WWDC-HD2 continued to simulcast WTSD until iHeartMedia's lease of that station ended in January 2026; "iHeart Sports DC" would continue solely on WWDC-HD2.
