= Sputnik (news agency) =

Russian state-owned news agency

- Type: State media
- Country: Russia
- Availability: Worldwide (except Europe)
- Owner: Rossiya Segodnya (owned and operated by the Russian government)
- Launch date: 29 October 1929; 96 years ago
- Official website: sputnikglobe.com
- Language: 23 languages (16 current, 7 former) Currently supported: Abkhazian, Arabic, Armenian, Belarusian, Brazilian Portuguese, Chinese, Dari, English, Kyrgyz, Ossetian, Persian, Russian, Serbian, Tajik, Uzbek, Vietnamese Formerly supported: Azerbaijani, Czech, Georgian, Japanese, Polish, Romanian, Turkish

Sputnik (Russian pronunciation: [ˈsputnʲɪk]; formerly Voice of Russia and RIA Novosti, naming derived from Russian спутник, "satellite") is a Russian state-owned news agency and radio broadcast service. It was established by the Russian government-owned news agency Rossiya Segodnya on 10 November 2014. With headquarters in Moscow, Sputnik maintains regional editorial offices in Washington, D.C., Cairo, Beijing, Paris, Berlin, Madrid, Montevideo and Rio de Janeiro. Sputnik describes itself as being focused on global politics and economics and aims for an international audience.

Sputnik is described by some academics and journalists as a “Russian propaganda” outlet. In 2016, Neil MacFarquhar of The New York Times wrote: "The fundamental purpose of dezinformatsiya, or Russian disinformation, experts said, is to undermine the official version of events—even the very idea that there is a true version of events—and foster a kind of policy paralysis." The Russian government rejects the validity of such assertions. In early 2019, Facebook removed hundreds of pages on its social media platform passing as independent news sites but were actually under the control of Sputnik employees.

Sputnik operates news websites, featuring reporting and commentary, in 31 languages including English, Spanish, Arabic and Serbian. The websites house over 800 hours of radio broadcasting material each day, and its newswire service runs a 24/7 service.

Sputnik was banned in the European Union in February 2022 (along with RT) following the start of Russo-Ukrainian war. Technology companies and social media services responded to the war by removing Sputnik from their platforms, while many language versions, including the French-, German- and Greek-language versions, ceased operations.

== History ==
RIA Novosti was Russia's international news agency until 9 December 2013 when it became known as Rossiya Segodnya. Dmitry Kiselev, an anchorman of the Russia-1 channel was appointed to be the first president of the reorganized agency. He soon announced that Margarita Simonyan was to be editor-in-chief. Simonyan told The New York Times in 2017 that she choose Sputnik as the new name "because I thought that's the only Russian word that has a positive connotation, and the whole world knows it."

Sputnik was launched on 10 November 2014 by Rossiya Segodnya, which is itself funded through RT, owned and operated by the Russian government, and was created via an Executive Order of the President of Russia on 9 December 2013. As well as the RIA Novosti news agency, Sputnik's origins can be traced to 1929 when Radio Moscow was launched as the official international broadcasting station of Soviet Union airing across the country, Eastern Europe and Cuba until it was replaced by Voice of Russia in 1993 along with the foreign language services of RIA Novosti. RT UK was launched a fortnight earlier. According to its editor-in-chief Dmitry Kiselyov, Sputnik was intended to reach a worldwide audience "tired of aggressive propaganda promoting a unipolar world and who want a different perspective". The station claims it "tells the untold". However, President Vladimir Putin, while visiting the Moscow base of the RT television network in 2013, said the objective behind both the then forthcoming Sputnik agency and RT was to "break the monopoly of the Anglo-Saxon global information streams."

In April 2017, Sputnik signed a personnel exchange deal with the Global Times, a Chinese Communist Party tabloid.

== Radio services ==
Radio Sputnik is the audio service of the Sputnik platform operating in 30 languages "for a total of over 800 hours a day, covering over 130 cities and 34 countries on "FM, DAB/DAB+ (Digital Radio Broadcasting), HD Radio, as well as mobile phones and the Internet." It is available on satellite transponders, including a 24-hour English service audible in North America via the Galaxy-19 satellite. Among the station's presenters are Max Keiser and Stacy Herbert who host the weekly talk show Double Down which concentrates on economics. Another talk show is By Any Means Necessary which is hosted by Eugene Puryear, while liberal talk radio host Thom Hartmann presents his own program which is syndicated on Sputnik each day.

Regarding plans for the U.S. broadcast market, the editor-in-chief of Sputnik U.S. said in a June 2017 interview that there were no immediate plans for expansion into markets beyond Washington, D.C. This came on the heels of a late June 2017 announcement that Radio Sputnik would sublease Reston, Virginia-licensed translator station W288BS (105.5 FM) from Reston Translator, LLC, which transmits from the WIAD tower in Bethesda, Maryland, and begin broadcasting Sputnik on that signal; the station's reach includes DC proper and the western suburbs in Northern Virginia. From November 2017, Radio Sputnik began to be carried on AM in Washington, D.C., on WZHF 1390 AM. The American owners of the stations were required to register as a foreign agent by the United States Department of Justice.

Sputnik is blocked from owning an American radio station outright due to Federal Communications Commission rules against foreign ownership of broadcast assets, as enacted in the Communications Act of 1934. Prior to 1 July 2017, Radio Sputnik (initially as its predecessor) had broadcast in the Washington, D.C., area on WTOP-HD2 (103.5-HD2) since June 2013, if not earlier. W288BS translates Urban One's WKYS (93.9)'s digital HD3 signal for analog broadcasting.

Sputnik distributes its programming to American stations via brokered programming, through agent Arnold Ferolito and his holding company RM Broadcasting, LLC. Its availability in Kansas City, Missouri on stations KCXL and KOJH from the beginning of January 2020 was contentious, especially in the latter case because the station has a jazz-centered community radio format and led to a clash on the radio spectrum.

Following the closure of the Echo of Moscow station on 3 March 2022, its frequencies were taken over by Radio Sputnik.

On 1 August 2025, Radio Sputnik came to Brazil, in the capital of Rio de Janeiro, through 80.5 in FM.

== Coverage of the United States ==
=== Trump and Clinton ===
During the 2016 presidential election campaign, according to former US Ambassador to Russia Michael McFaul writing in The Washington Post, Sputnik made clear publicly its preference for the then-Republican presidential nominee Donald Trump over the Democrat's nominee Hillary Clinton.

According to a fake news story circulated by Sputnik, President Barack Obama and Hillary Clinton created ISIS; the website praised Trump, before he was elected in 2016, for making such an assertion. The website published an article entitled "Secret File Confirms Trump Claim: Obama, Hillary 'Founded ISIS' to Oust Assad", while tweets from Sputnik used the hashtag #CrookedHillary. Trump revived another discredited conspiracy theory promoted by Sputnik that Google was suppressing bad news about Clinton.

In October 2016, Sputnik improperly cited an article written by Kurt Eichenwald for Newsweek misattributing comments to Hillary Clinton confidante Sidney Blumenthal (who quoted Eichenwald in a non-verified email released by WikiLeaks). Sputnik took down the article. Aspects of his story as it related to Trump were disputed at the time, Sputnik then put up an article reputedly denying its control by the Kremlin and attacking Newsweek and Eichenwald. He wrote that the Trump campaign emailed reporters a link to the Sputnik article and asked them to follow up on the story. The author of the Sputnik article, Bill Moran, successfully sued Newsweek over his assertion that Eichenwald had used bribery and threats.

Forbes reported that Sputnik International reported fake news and fabricated statements by White House Press Secretary Josh Earnest during the 2016 presidential election. Sputnik falsely reported on 7 December 2016 that Earnest stated sanctions for Russia were on the table related to Syria, falsely quoting Earnest as saying: "There are a number of things that are to be considered, including some of the financial sanctions that the United States can administer in coordination with our allies. I would definitely not rule that out." Forbes analyzed Earnest's White House press briefing from that week, and found the word "sanctions" was never used by the Press Secretary. Russia was discussed in eight instances during the press conference, but never about sanctions. The press conference focused solely on Russian air raids in Syria towards rebels fighting President of Syria Bashar al-Assad in Aleppo.

Lee Stranahan was hired by Sputnik News after his departure from Breitbart News and, according to The Washington Post, he is Sputnik's most visible Trump supporter". In early 2020, at the time of the Impeachment of President Trump, Stranahan stated "the entire impeachment is a lie." The Washington Post stated that "many Sputnik hosts profess skepticism that Russia meddled in the 2016 presidential election," in contradiction to the assessment of the US intelligence community.

=== Andrew Feinberg's account ===
On 26 May 2017, Andrew Feinberg, who had been Sputnik's White House Correspondent since the Trump administration came into office the previous January, announced on Twitter that he would no longer be reporting for the agency. He said those in charge were more interested in employing "propagandists" rather than "real journalists". In one tweet he explained the agency's policy in article's attribution: "The truth is they don't want their reporters to have their own reputations, b/c a lie is easier when it doesn't come with a byline." He told Erik Wemple of The Washington Post: "It's the fact that if you don't have bylines on stories and there's no one accountable for words, then you can really print whatever you want. Sputnik, in a statement to The Washington Post, accused Feinberg of making "false accusations" and expressed the "hope that the fruits of his rich imagination would not create more conspiracy theories around Sputnik."

Feinberg, in discussing his period at Sputnik, said that Sputnik's editors asked him to write stories and ask questions at the White House press conference about the conspiracy theory between the murder of Democratic National Committee staffer Seth Rich in Washington and the leaking of DNC documents to WikiLeaks. Feinberg wrote of his discomfort as "there was absolutely no factual basis for doing so." The District of Columbia police believed that Rich had been murdered while being robbed. Feinberg believed that the editors wanted to shift blame for the leaking of the DNC documents from Russian hackers to Rich. Sputnik News has published articles promoting conspiracy theories about the murder of Seth Rich.

In an interview with Brian Stelter for CNN, Feinberg said that Sputnik management had insisted on approving or dictating questions he would ask at White House press briefings, and wanted him to ask questions to imply that the April 2017 Sarin gas attack in Syria was a hoax: "I was asked to put questions to the White House that framed the issue in such a way that made it seem that the attack didn't happen, that it was staged," In particular, he was asked to raise at the White House the assertions made by Ted Postol querying Syrian responsibility for the attack. On that occasion, he was not called. Feinberg wrote in a Politico August 2017 article, he had concluded after the request that Sputnik's "mission wasn't really to report the news as much as it was to push a narrative that would either sow doubts about situations that weren't flattering to Russia or its allies, or hurt the reputation of the United States and its allies."

=== Other United States responses ===
In April 2018, journalist John Stanton, who had been Sputnik's Pentagon Correspondent for roughly two years, published a report highly critical of Sputnik News, Sputnik Radio, and RIA Novosti, declaring that both the organizations were part of a larger Russian Information Warfare Operation. His public findings were part of an insider research effort while at Sputnik on behalf of the US government.

In May 2018, the Public Broadcasting Service's NewsHour website published an article by Elizabeth Flock who reported that Sputnik News and Radio reports "seemed intended to polarize" and "to distract and confuse" after listening to them over a week. On a visit to the station, she discovered "a stranger picture than I anticipated, one in which I began to understand how persuasive disinformation could be." According to Flock, Stanton told her "They mix real with unreal, use dubious sources". It was difficult for him to point to the real problem as it "was like pushing a wet noodle." In other words, establishing what can be labelled disinformation is extremely difficult, she concluded.

Foreign Policy magazine has described Sputnik as a slick and internet-savvy outlet of Kremlin propaganda, which "remixes President Vladimir Putin's brand of revanchist nationalism for an international audience... beating a predictable drum of anti-Western rhetoric."

In January 2022, the U.S. State Department's Global Engagement Center (GEC) published a report titled "Kremlin-Funded Media: RT and Sputnik's Role in Russia's Disinformation and Propaganda Ecosystem." Its case studies included one on "false narratives" published by Sputnik and RT justifying Russian military buildup on the Ukrainian border.

== European coverage and responses ==
Ben Nimmo, in a paper for the Center for European Policy Analysis (CEPA), wrote that Sputnik invitations concentrate on a select group of politicians for their east European services, especially those known for their pro-Russian (Tatjana Ždanoka in Latvia) or anti-EU opinions (Janusz Korwin-Mikke in Poland). These two political figures have limited support in their countries; Korwin-Mikke gained slightly more than 3% in Poland's presidential election in May 2015, while Ždanoka is barred from holding public office for her opposition to Latvia's independence from Russia. Sputnik has spread a false claim about Angela Merkel, the chancellor of Germany, who was wrongly said to have posed for a selfie with an ISIS suspect.

In the opinion of Kevin Rothrock, Russia editor for Global Voices, Sputnik "acts as a spoiler to try and disrupt or blur information unfriendly to Russia, such as Russian troops' alleged involvement in the war in Ukraine".

German journalist and author Michael Thumann describes Sputnik as being part of what he calls Russia's "digital information war against the West". Peter Pomerantsev, in an article for the London Sunday Times, wrote that in the 2017 German elections the Sputnik news agency was negative or neutral about the country's political parties, with the exception of the right-wing nationalist Alternative for Germany (AfD).

Alexander Podrabinek, a Russian journalist who works for Radio France Internationale (part of French Government's France Médias Monde) and Radio Liberty (supervised by Broadcasting Board of Governors, an Independent agency of the U.S. Federal government) has accused Sputnik of disseminating Russian state propaganda abroad. In a vote urging for the European Union (EU) to "respond to information warfare by Russia", the European Parliament accused broadcasting channels Sputnik and RT of "information warfare", and placed Russian media organisations alongside terrorist organisations such as the Islamic State. The federal agency of Rossotrudnichestvo and the Russkiy Mir Foundation were also seen as tools for Russian propaganda. According to a study by Masaryk University, Sputnik is one of the major sources of Russian propaganda in the Czech Republic.

In August 2016, Sputnik opened offices in Edinburgh, Scotland, its headquarters in the UK. The agency established its radio studio and bureau in the city. In April 2021, The Times reported Russian sources had said Sputnik's London and Edinburgh offices were closing with the outlet's English language staff being concentrated in Washington DC and Moscow.

A January 2017 report by The Swedish Institute of International Affairs found that a Swedish-language version of Sputnik News website was one of the main tools used by the Russian government to spread false information in Sweden including publicizing documents posted on little-known Swedish and Russian websites which were found to be forgeries. According to the report, Sputnik News frequently focused on negative stories about NATO and the EU, consistent with Russia's foreign policy interest of minimizing NATO's role in the Baltic region and keeping Sweden out of NATO. A research analysis done by Martin Kragh and Sebestian Asberg at the Swedish Institute of International Affairs, found that Swedish Sputnik focused on depicting Russia as under attack by aggressive Western governments, describing EU as being in "terminal decline", and NATO as a dangerous military threat. These efforts were believed to try to change how the public in Sweden viewed its government and the EU. The Swedish-language version ran for a year from April 2015 to spring of 2016, where it was forced to shut down and removed from the internet in that year.

In April 2017, Emmanuel Macron's campaign team banned both RT and Sputnik from campaign events. A Macron spokesperson said the two broadcasting outlets showed a "systematic desire to issue fake news and false information". A report claiming the pro-Russian candidate, François Fillon, had returned to the lead prior to the election was the subject of a reprimand from the country's election commission. Sputnik had falsely attributed the result to an opinion poll, whereas the assertion had actually originated from Brand Analytics, a Moscow-based company. A few weeks after Macron won the presidential election, President Putin visited the Versailles Palace. During a joint press conference with the Russian leader, Macron himself accused Sputnik and RT of having "produced slanderous countertruths".

In June 2019, it was found that Serbian language outlet of Sputnik has infiltrated a disinformation hub in Bosnia and Herzegovina. These findings were published by internationally recognized fact-checking platform Raskrinkavanje, which wrote reports about Sputnik bias towards spreading disinformation, in a 106-page document.

With the intention of protecting democratic values and to combat Russian disinformation campaigns utilizing RT and Sputnik, the European Union established The East StratCom Task Force in 2015.

During the 2022 Russian invasion of Ukraine, Sputnik republished an RIA Novosti article by Petr Akopov titled "The arrival/attack of Russia and the new world" ("Наступление России и нового мира"), which falsely claimed that Russia had won the Russo-Ukrainian War, lauded Putin's invasion for solving the "Ukrainian question", and declared the end of "Western global domination" with the start of a "new world order" that joined Russia, Belarus, and Ukraine against the rest of Europe. The article remained available on Sputnik's website after RIA Novosti took it down from its own.

=== COVID-19 disinformation ===
A report by Sputnik's Belarusian service claimed the virus was an "Anglo-Saxon" plot to counter China while Sputnik's associated outlet in South Ossetia (currently occupied by Russian armed forces) said the COVID-19 virus was created as a weapon in the West for information warfare. Its Armenian affiliate insisted the virus had been created in a US laboratory. A Sputnik-associated outlet in Latvia, suggested it might have been created in Latvia.

== Middle East coverage ==
In the Middle East, Russia used Sputnik and RT Arabic to promote its foreign policy goals through "informational warfare". Russia tried to increase its power and presence in the Middle East as well as reduce United States influence in the region, fight terrorism, and establish allies in Syria with Bashar al-Assad.

In April 2017, Sputnik and RT reported little to no information on the Khan Shaykhun chemical attack in Syria. During the attacks, Sputnik and RT did not report on the incident; there was no coverage provided on the survivors or their testimonies, and the history of violence in the area such as massacres, bombings, and chemical attacks that have occurred in the Syrian regime were not recorded. After the massacre, Sputnik and RT widely questioned the cause and the history of the massacre through daily reports; false and missing information was frequently cited as the identities of the claimed "experts" were not shared, and alternative versions of the event were falsely reported as they claimed that the attacks were done by the White Helmets, a Syrian civil volunteer organization. Journalist Finian Cunningham wrote that the White Helmets were "propaganda conduits for al-Qaeda terror groups" which contributed to the controversy and negative news that the White Helmets faced. Published reports by Sputnik at the time were considered biased and did not consist of reliable sources or experts. These statements were shared by Sputnik and RT throughout social media platforms as well as other news outlets that supported the Syrian regime.

During the 2025–2026 Iranian protests, the Persian-language service of Sputnik labelled protesters as "rioters" and "mercenaries". During the 2026 Iran war, it advocated for Mojtaba Khamenei to succeed his father as the new Supreme Leader of Iran, and for Iran to obtain nuclear weapons by following the "North Korean model" instead of the "failed Libyan model".

== International bans and restrictions ==
In March 2016, access to Sputnik's online content was blocked by Turkish authorities, as well as denying the Turkish bureau chief Tural Kerimov access to the country. The development was thought to have been in response to comments by the Russian leadership critical of President Recep Tayyip Erdoğan and the Turkish government's record on human rights and freedom of speech. The website was unblocked later that same year. In 2018, the agency shut down its website in the Kurdish language without mentioning any particular reason for the decision. Former employees of Sputnik said that the news agency decided to shut it down at Turkey's request, as part of both anti-Kurdish political movement and pro-Russian politics of Erdoğan.

In October 2017, Twitter banned both RT and Sputnik from advertising on their social networking service following the conclusions of the U.S. national intelligence report the previous January that both Sputnik and RT had been used as vehicles for Russia's interference in the 2016 US presidential election. The decision prompted a stern response from spokeswoman Maria Zakharova of the Russian Foreign Ministry, saying the ban was a "gross violation" by the United States of the guarantees of free speech, and that "Retaliatory measures, naturally, will follow". In November, Alphabet chairman Eric Schmidt announced that Google will be "deranking" stories from RT and Sputnik in response to "weaponised" content and allegations about election meddling by President Putin's government, provoking claims of censorship from both outlets.

To reduce the spread of disinformation, Facebook and Google implemented fact-checking tools throughout their platforms. In January 2019, Facebook removed 289 pages and 75 accounts that the company said were used by Sputnik for misinformation on Facebook. The removed pages posed as independent news sites in eastern Europe and elsewhere but were actually run by employees at Sputnik. It was another in a series of actions taken by Facebook against Russian disinformation. Along with Chinese and other Russian state media outlets, Twitter attached a "state-affiliated media" label to Sputnik's account. The Wikipedia community has deprecated Sputnik as an unreliable source of information.

In July 2019, British Foreign and Commonwealth Office banned both RT and Sputnik from attending the Global Conference for Media Freedom in London for "their active role in spreading disinformation". The Russian Embassy called the decision "direct politically motivated discrimination". European Union External Action East StratCom Task Force and separate fact-checkers have discerned reoccurrences of Sputnik and RT publishing false information.

In January 2020, the Estonian offices of Sputnik were closed after police warned its journalists about potential criminal charges. The action taken by the Estonian government was a result of European Union sanctions imposed on Dmitry Kiselyov. Banks in Estonia suspended Sputnik related accounts in October 2019.

Following the Russian invasion of Ukraine in late February 2022, the president of the European Commission, Ursula von der Leyen, announced the banning of Sputnik, along with RT and their subsidiaries, from the European Union. Social media services including Facebook, Instagram, TikTok, and YouTube blocked Sputnik and RT content for their European Union users, while Reddit blocked outgoing links to Sputnik's and RT's websites in all regions. On 2 March, an EU regulation was published, which put the ban in force. Microsoft and Apple Inc. responded by removing the Sputnik and RT apps from the Microsoft Store and the App Store, respectively. On 11 March, YouTube blocked Sputnik and RT worldwide.

On 13 September 2023, the bureau chief of Sputnik Moldova, Vitaly Denisov, was deported and banned entry into the country for 10 years. Moldova's General Inspectorate for Migration stated that Denisov's presence in Moldova "endangers the informational security of our country." Daniel Voda, the Moldovan press secretary, stated that Sputnik was "constantly dealing with informational attacks, lies, propaganda and disinformation." Russian Foreign Ministry spokeswoman Maria Zakharova called the deportation "ugly" and promised "retaliatory measures." Moldova believed Denisov was a Russian colonel and GRU officer.

== Other operations ==
=== Wire services ===
As a news agency, Sputnik maintains the following news wires:

English

- Sputnik News Service
- Sputnik News Service: Russia
- Sputnik News Service: Russia, Ukraine & the Baltics
- Sputnik Exclusives
- Sputnik Defense and Space

Spanish

- Sputnik Nóvosti
- Sputnik Hispano (news from Spain, Latin America and other Spanish-speaking communities)
- Sputnik Rusia y CEI (Russia and the CIS)
- Sputnik Economía (economy)

Chinese

- Sputnik Chinese News Service
- Russian-Chinese relations
- News about Russia
- International news

Arabic

- Sputnik Arabic News Service
- Sputnik Middle East
- Sputnik Russia in the World
- Sputnik Telling The Untold (exclusive reports and interviews)

Persian

- Sputnik Farsi News Service

=== Online news ===
List indicators
- ^{RIA} : RIA Novosti previously operated online editions in these languages.
- ^{VOR} : inherited from Voice of Russia's online news service.
- ^{ru} : Sputnik also operates Russian language editions for areas served by these editions.

Apart from wire services, Sputnik also operates online news in following languages:

- Abkhaz^{ru}
- Arabic^{RIA} ^{VOR}
- Armenian^{ru}
- Azerbaijani^{ru}
- Belarusian^{ru}
- Chinese^{RIA} ^{VOR}
- Dari^{VOR}
- English^{RIA} ^{VOR}
- English for India^{VOR}
- English for Africa^{VOR}
- French for Africa^{RIA} ^{VOR}
- Georgian^{ru}
- Hindi^{VOR}
- Japanese^{RIA} ^{VOR}
- Kazakh^{ru}
- Kyrgyz^{ru}
- Ossetian^{ru}
- Persian^{RIA} ^{VOR}
- Portuguese for Brazil^{VOR}
- Romanian for Moldova^{ru}
  - (edition for Romania, hosted by the Moldovan edition)
- Serbian^{VOR}
- Spanish for Latin America^{RIA} ^{VOR}
- Tajik^{ru}
- Turkish^{VOR}
- Uzbek^{ru}
- Vietnamese^{VOR}

Sputnik previously operated the following editions, which were later shut down (some as effect of sanctions):

- Czech^{VOR}
- Danish^{VOR}
- Estonian^{ru}
- Finnish^{VOR}
- German^{RIA} ^{VOR}
- Greek^{RIA} ^{VOR}
- Indonesian
- Italian^{VOR}
- Korean for South Korea^{VOR}
- Kurdish^{VOR}
- Latvian^{ru}
- Lithuanian^{ru}
- Malay
- Norwegian^{VOR}
- Pashto^{VOR}
- Polish^{VOR}
- Swedish^{VOR}
- Thai
- Urdu^{VOR}

== Broadcast languages ==
In 2023, the Sputnik radio had broadcasts in seven languages, including:

- Arabic
- English
- Portuguese
- Russian
- Spanish
- Serbian
- Turkish

== See also ==
- Disinformation in the Russian invasion of Ukraine
- Mass media in Russia
- Radio Moscow
- Russian–Ukrainian information war
- Sputnik (magazine)
- Marats Kasems
