= KCXL =

- Liberty, Missouri; United States
- Broadcast area: Kansas City metropolitan area
- Frequency: 1140 kHz
- Branding: KCXL 1140 AM, 102.9 FM & 104.7 FM

Programming
- Format: Conservative talk; Brokered and religious (weekends)
- Affiliations: TruNews

Ownership
- Owner: Pete Schartel; (Alpine Broadcasting)
- Sister stations: KCTO

History
- First air date: February 12, 1967
- Former call signs: KBIL (1967–1978); KFIX (1978–1980); KLDY (1980–1982); KKCI (1982–1984)

Technical information
- Licensing authority: FCC
- Facility ID: 1162
- Class: D
- Power: 4,000 watts (day); 6 watts (night)
- Transmitter coordinates: 39°14′17″N 94°24′0″W
- Translators: 102.9 K275BQ (Kansas City); 104.7 K284CH (Kansas City)

Links
- Public license information: Public file; LMS
- Webcast: Listen live; Listen live (alternate stream)
- Website: kcxl.com

KCXL (1140 AM) is a commercial radio station licensed to Liberty, Missouri, United States, and features a conservative talk format. Owned by Alpine Broadcasting, this station serves the Kansas City metropolitan area with studios and transmitter both located in Liberty. In addition to a standard analog transmission, KCXL is available online and relayed over two translators licensed to Kansas City: K275BQ (102.9 FM) and K284CH (104.7 FM).

The station began broadcasting in 1967 as country music-formatted KBIL and went through several formats in the late 1970s and early 1980s; from 1984 to 1992, it was an urban contemporary station. After folding due to low advertising revenues and defaulting on a loan, the station was acquired by Pete Schartel and returned to service in 1994. Since 2020, KCXL has been noted for its broadcast of Radio Sputnik, an English-language radio service funded by the Russian government.

== History ==
=== Early years ===
On September 7, 1966, Clay Broadcasters, Inc., a consortium of six local businessmen, obtained a construction permit from the Federal Communications Commission (FCC) to build a new 500-watt, daytime-only station in Liberty. KBIL—representing "Clay Broadcasting in Liberty"—went on the air February 12, 1967, with a country music format. The station was acquired by Mack Sanders's S & M Investments, which owned outlets in other Plains states, in 1971. Sanders retained what he called a "Proud Country" format, focusing on a traditional mix of country music.

S & M proposed to the FCC that 106.5 MHz be inserted at Liberty with changes to the frequencies of three other stations in the region. Construction of the FM took place in 1978. Simultaneously with the launch of the FM station, KBIL and the unbuilt FM were sold to Strauss Broadcasting Corporation for $1.28 million, with the stations becoming KFIX and KFIX-FM. Joe Abernathy, the general manager who ran the KFIX stations (and hired Rush Limbaugh under the name "Jeff Christie" as a late-night host on the FM side), was blamed by Strauss for financial mismanagement of the pair; much-ballyhooed morning host Mike Murphy could not join for five months due to contractual obligations, and early issues with the FM signal kept listeners away. The stations were then sold to Southwest Radio Enterprises, a division of Southwest Florida Enterprises; it was the firm's first broadcasting purchase. Southwest named Dean Goodman, later the owner of GoodRadio.TV, as CEO. The FM was renamed KSAS; the next year, it was the AM's turn for a revamp, becoming oldies under the call sign KLDY. The call letters were changed to KKCI in 1982 when Golden East Broadcasting purchased KLDY and KSAS and converted both stations to a simulcast.

=== Urban contemporary format ===
Golden East put the AM station on the market and found a buyer in 1984: Elbert Anderson, the Black owner of a local Coca-Cola bottling company. New studios were built on 63rd Street to handle the majority of the programming, and the station became KCXL with an urban contemporary format, the third local radio station for Kansas City's Black community. A satellite studio was built in 1989 in The Landing shopping center.

However, because the signal was limited to the suburban Northland, it eventually fell short competing with longtime station KPRS. The station subsisted on the sale of air time to churches and on selling advertising around their programs. A dip in advertising revenue would prove to be too much for the station to bear; it went off the air on March 4, 1992. KCXL was then sued by the Small Business Administration (SBA) for defaulting on a 1984 loan it had received to finance the purchase; no payments had been made since 1989.

=== Schartel ownership ===
The SBA took possession of KCXL's assets and put them up for sale. Two years later, they had a buyer: Pete Schartel, a resident of nearby Independence, Missouri, who returned the station to the air with an oldies format on November 21, 1994.

Since Schartel took over, the station has aired a myriad of programs under its talk format, some of them on a leased basis. For a time, at night, WHB leased KCXL at night for overflow sports programming; the station also had an overnight dance format brokered to Surge Radio between 2016 and 2017. KCXL's general mix of programming was described by a 2020 article in The New York Times as "a cast of far-right conspiracy theorists, evangelical pastors and anti-Semites", including the radio program from far-right conspiracy theory outlet TruNews and far-right nationalist Alex Jones.

=== Broadcast of Radio Sputnik ===
My wife and I really did discuss whether we should pull this programming. If I did, we'd be doing exactly what we're - the primary thing that we criticize - well, the old Soviet Union for sure, and other communist regimes of doing, where they don't allow free speech.

— Pete Schartel, in an interview with NPR

In a time brokerage agreement with RM Broadcasting, KCXL began airing Radio Sputnik six hours a day beginning on January 1, 2020. The time brokerage agreement pays KCXL $100,217 per year, and Schartel later acknowledged he signed it largely for financial reasons. Funded and directed by the Russian government, the U.S. Department of State has declared that Russian media outlets Sputnik and RT (Russia Today) are "critical elements in Russia's disinformation and propaganda ecosystem."

In the wake of the 2022 Russian invasion of Ukraine, the airing of Sputnik content on KCXL and other U.S. radio stations came under fire, with the National Association of Broadcasters calling on stations to cease airing such programming. However, in a March 2022 interview, Jonne Santoli-Schartel, the station manager, stated that even though she disapproves of the invasion of Ukraine, KCXL has no plans to discontinue its broadcast of Sputnik output, stating, "If we can't express our viewpoints anymore, and we have cancel culture, and people deleting and people putting pressure on other people to not hear certain programming, then we're in trouble and freedom no longer exists." The editorial board of The Kansas City Star criticized this decision as unethical and unpatriotic.
