= WUST =

- Washington, D.C.; United States
- Broadcast area: Washington metropolitan area
- Frequency: 1120 kHz
- Branding: DMV's BIN 1120

Programming
- Language: English
- Format: All-news radio
- Network: Black Information Network

Ownership
- Owner: iHeartMedia; (iHM Licenses LLC)
- Sister stations: WASH; WBIG-FM; WIHT; WMZQ-FM; WWDC

History
- First air date: February 9, 1947
- Former call signs: WBCC (1947–1951)
- Call sign meaning: previous studio location in the U Street district

Technical information
- Licensing authority: FCC
- Facility ID: 48686
- Class: D
- Power: 50,000 watts (day); 3,000 watts (critical hours)
- Transmitter coordinates: 38°52′9.4″N 76°53′45.9″W

Links
- Public license information: Public file; LMS
- Webcast: Listen live (via iHeartRadio)
- Website: dmv.binnews.com

WUST (1120 AM) is a commercial all-news radio station licensed to serve Washington, D.C. The station is owned by iHeartMedia. The station services the Washington metropolitan area as the market affiliate of the Black Information Network.

The WUST studios are located on Rockville Pike in the district suburb of Rockville, Maryland, while the station transmitter resides in Capitol Heights. In addition to a standard analog transmission, WUST programming is available online via iHeartRadio. While WUST operates at 50,000 watts during the day, the station is required to reduce power during critical hours — and go off the air during nighttime hours — to protect the signal of KMOX in St. Louis, the dominant Class A station on 1120 AM.

== History ==
WUST first signed on on February 9, 1947, as WBCC, licensed to the Washington, DC, suburb of Bethesda, Maryland, with 250 watts of power, broadcasting in the daytime only. It had been a rhythm and blues station. Its call sign came from its studio location at 1120 U Street, NW, later moving to 815 V Street NW, site of today's 9:30 Club.

During the 1950s, DJs Lord Fauntleroy Bandy and "Terrible" Thomas popularized R&B music with high school students, weaning them from Top 40. Part of the appeal of WUST was its location in the red light district of the time.

During late August 1963, the ballroom of the WUST studio served as the operations headquarters for the August 28 March on Washington for Jobs and Freedom.

On April 6, 2017, WUST filed an application with the Federal Communications Commission for a construction permit to remain on the air at night with 50 watts. The application was accepted for filing on April 12, 2017.

New World Radio sold WUST to Herndon, Virginia-based Potomac Radio Group for $750,000 on September 18, 2018. On August 31, 2020, WUST switched from ethnic programming to an all news radio format using programming from iHeartMedia's Black Information Network; several programs from the previous ethnic format were moved online. iHeartMedia subsequently purchased WUST for $1.2 million.
