= WMZQ-FM =

Country music radio station in Washington, DC

- Washington, D.C.; United States
- Broadcast area: Washington metropolitan area
- Frequency: 98.7 MHz (HD Radio)
- RDS: 98.7WMZQ
- Branding: 98.7 WMZQ

Programming
- Language: English
- Format: Country
- Subchannels: HD2: Freedom 104.7 (conservative talk)
- Affiliations: iHeartRadio; Premiere Networks

Ownership
- Owner: iHeartMedia; (iHM Licenses, LLC)
- Sister stations: WASH; WBIG-FM; WIHT; WUST; WWDC

History
- First air date: April 2, 1947
- Former call signs: WWDC-FM (1947–1950); WOL-FM (1950–1968); WMOD (1968–1977)
- Former frequencies: 100.9 MHz (1947); 101.1 MHz (1947–1950)
- Call sign meaning: tribute to WMAQ, abbreviation of "music"

Technical information
- Licensing authority: FCC
- Facility ID: 73305
- Class: B
- ERP: 50,000 watts
- HAAT: 149 meters (489 ft)

Links
- Public license information: Public file; LMS
- Webcast: Listen live (via iHeartRadio); HD2: Listen live (via iHeartRadio)
- Website: wmzq.iheart.com; HD2: freedom1047.iheart.com

WMZQ-FM (98.7 MHz) is a commercial FM radio station in Washington, D.C. owned by iHeartMedia, it has had a country music radio format since 1977. The station's studios and offices are on Rockville Pike in Rockville, Maryland, and its transmitter is on Tower Street in Falls Church, Virginia. WMZQ-FM has an effective radiated power (ERP) of 50,000 watts, the maximum power for radio stations in the Washington area.

WMZQ-FM broadcasts in the HD Radio format. Its HD2 digital subchannel airs a conservative talk format, known as "Freedom 104.7." It feeds FM translator W284CQ at 104.7 MHz.

== History ==
This station signed on the air on April 2, 1947, as WWDC-FM, originally on 100.9 MHz, moving to 101.1 MHz a few months later. It was owned by the Capital Broadcasting Company with its studios at 1000 Connecticut Avenue NW. The station originally simulcast its sister station, WWDC (1450 AM).

Meanwhile, WOL-FM signed on at 98.7 MHz in 1947, simulcasting its sister station, WOL (1260 AM). In 1950, WWDC and WOL came under common ownership; that February 20, WWDC moved to the far higher-powered 1260 kHz allocation, and WOL was shifted to 1450 kHz to be resold. WWDC-FM also swapped call signs and facilities with WOL-FM on the same day, and each simply modified their licenses to continue operating on their same frequencies. As the actual licenses were not exchanged, WMZQ-FM is the legal successor of the original WWDC-FM.

WOL-AM-FM aired a full service rhythm and blues format, featuring personalities, news and talk for the African-American community. It was owned by the Peoples Broadcasting Company, relocated to the 1000 Connecticut Avenue NW studios and offices.

In 1965, WOL-AM-FM were acquired by the Sonderling Broadcasting Company. In 1968, Sonderling switched the FM station to an oldies format, as WMOD, while the AM continued as an R&B station. WMOD played the rock-era hits of the 1950s and early 1960s, including doo-wop music. By the mid-1970s, the format shifted to classic rock.

In 1977, Sonderling switched 98.7 to country music as WMZQ-FM. Although press reports at the time attributed the call sign as a simple abbreviation of "music", then-program director Bill Figenshu claims to have chosen it in homage to WMAQ in Chicago, which was at the time a successful large-market country station. A since-repealed Federal Communications Commission rule also required stations to notify their competitors of a call sign change, and Figenshu suspected the "Q" – then as now, a common branding for contemporary music stations – might fool them into thinking a Top 40 format was about to launch.

The Washington market already had one FM station playing modern country, but it was based in Northern Virginia: WXRA, licensed to Woodbridge, Virginia. Its signal had a hard time reaching the D.C. suburbs north of Washington, while WMZQ-FM covered the entire D.C. radio market. The change proved a success for WMZQ-FM and the station at 105.9 eventually switched to classic rock.

Viacom acquired WMZQ-FM a few years after the switch to the country format. In 1987, Viacom began simulcasting WMZQ-FM on AM station WMZQ in Arlington, Virginia.

In 1997, WMZQ-FM switched hands again, this time acquired by Chancellor Media. In 2000, Chancellor was acquired by Clear Channel Communications, which a few years later became iHeartMedia, the current owner.

== HD Radio and translator ==
On July 10, 2023, WMZQ-FM HD2 dropped its simulcast with Black Information Network station WUST (1120 AM), and launched a conservative talk format, branded as "Freedom 104.7".

WMZQ rebroadcasts its HD2 format on the following translator:

Broadcast translator for WMZQ-FM HD2
Call sign	Frequency	City of license	FID	ERP (W)	HAAT	Class	Transmitter coordinates	FCC info
W284CQ	104.7 FM	Washington, D.C.	31140	99	140 m (459 ft)	D	38°53′30″N 77°7′54″W	LMS
